= SET domain =

SET
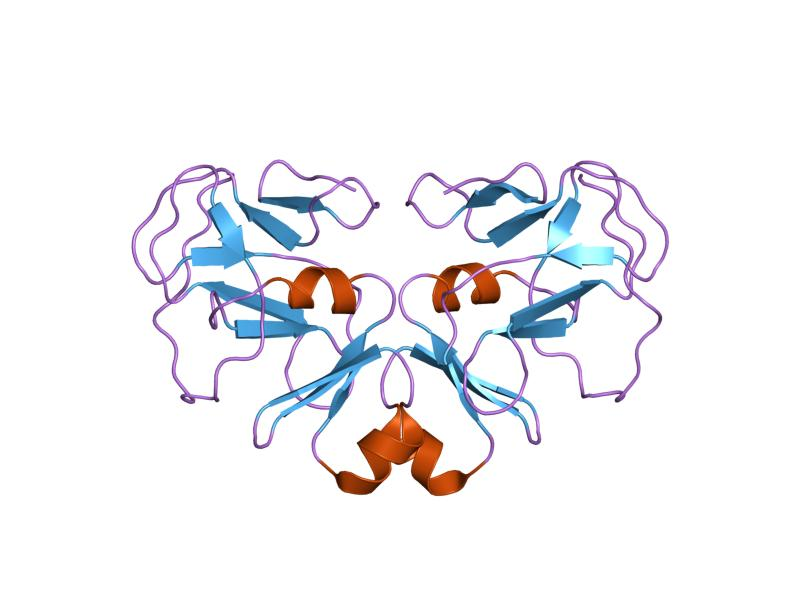
- structure and substrate of a histone H3 lysine methyltransferase from Paramecium bursaria chlorella virus 1

Identifiers
- Symbol: SET
- Pfam: PF00856
- InterPro: IPR001214
- SMART: SM0468
- SCOP2: 1ml9 / SCOPe / SUPFAM
Available protein structures:
- PDB: IPR001214 PF00856 (ECOD; PDBsum)
- AlphaFold: IPR001214; PF00856

The SET domain is a protein domain that typically has methyltransferase activity. It was originally identified as part of a larger conserved region present in the Drosophila Trithorax protein and was subsequently identified in the Drosophila Su(var)3-9 and 'Enhancer of zeste' proteins, from which the acronym SET is derived [Su(var)3-9, Enhancer-of-zeste and Trithorax].

== Structure ==
The SET domain appears generally as one part of a larger multidomain protein, and recently there were described three structures of very different proteins with distinct domain compositions:

- Neurospora crassa DIM-5, a member of the Su(var) family of histone lysine methyltransferases (HKMTs) which methylate histone H3 on lysine 9,
- human SETD7 (also called SET7 or SET9), which methylates H3 on lysine 4
- garden pea Rubisco LSMT, an enzyme that does not modify histones, but instead methylates lysine 14 in the flexible tail of the large subunit of the enzyme Rubisco.

The SET domain itself turned out to be an uncommon structure. Although in all three studies, electron density maps revealed the location of the AdoMet or AdoHcy cofactor, the SET domain bears no similarity at all to the canonical/AdoMet-dependent methyltransferase fold. Strictly conserved in the C-terminal motif of the SET domain tyrosine could be involved in abstracting a proton from the protonated amino group of the substrate lysine, promoting its nucleophilic attack on the sulphonium methyl group of the AdoMet cofactor. In contrast to the AdoMet-dependent protein methyltranferases of the classical type, which tend to bind their polypeptide substrates on top of the cofactor, it is noted from the Rubisco LSMT structure that the AdoMet seems to bind in a separate cleft, suggesting how a polypeptide substrate could be subjected to multiple rounds of methylation without having to be released from the enzyme. In contrast, SET7/9 is able to add only a single methyl group to its substrate.

== Function ==
It has been demonstrated that association of SET domain and myotubularin-related proteins modulates growth control. The SET domain-containing Drosophila melanogaster (Fruit fly) protein, enhancer of zeste, has a function in segment determination and the mammalian homologue may be involved in the regulation of gene transcription and chromatin structure.

Histone lysine methylation is part of the histone code that regulates chromatin function and epigenetic control of gene function. Histone lysine methyltransferases (HMTase) differ both in their substrate specificity for the various acceptor lysines as well as in their product specificity for the number of methyl groups (one, two, or three) they transfer. With just one exception, the HMTases belong to SET family that can be classified according to the sequences surrounding the SET domain. Structural studies on the human SET7/9, a mono-methylase, have revealed the molecular basis for the specificity of the enzyme for the histone-target and the roles of the invariant residues in the SET domain in determining the methylation specificities.

== Associated domains ==
The N-terminal pre-SET domain (InterPro: IPR007728), as found in the SUV39 SET family, contains nine invariant cysteine residues that are grouped into two segments separated by a region of variable length. These nine cysteines coordinate three zinc ions to form a triangular cluster, where each of the zinc ions is coordinated by four cysteines to give a tetrahedral configuration. The function of this domain is structural, holding together two long segments of random coils.

The C-terminal region including the post-SET domain (InterPro: IPR003616) is disordered when not interacting with a histone tail and in the absence of zinc. The three conserved cysteines in the post-SET domain form a zinc-binding site when coupled to a fourth conserved cysteine in the knot-like structure close to the SET domain active site. The structured post-SET region brings in the C-terminal residues that participate in S-adenosyl-L-methionine-binding and histone tail interactions. The three conserved cysteine residues are essential for HMTase activity, as replacement with serine abolishes HMTase activity.

== Examples ==
Human genes encoding proteins containing this domain include:

- ASH1L, also has an associated with SET domain (AWS)
- EHMT1 (FP13812), EHMT2 (BAT8), EZH1, EZH2
- MLL, MLL2, MLL3, MLL5
- NSD1, NSD2, NSD3
- PRDM1, PRDM2, PRDM5
- SETD1A, SETD2, SETD3, SETD4, SETD5, SETD6, SETD7, SETD8, SETDB1, SETDB2, SETMAR, SMYD1, SMYD3, SMYD4, SMYD5, SUV39H1, SUV39H2, KMT5B, SUV420H2,
- WBP7
