= Ribulose-bisphosphate-carboxylase/oxygenase N-methyltransferase =

Ribulose-bisphosphate-carboxylase/oxygenase N-methyltransferase may refer to:

- (Ribulose-bisphosphate carboxylase)-lysine N-methyltransferase
- (Fructose-bisphosphate aldolase)-lysine N-methyltransferase
