= S-adenosyl-L-methionine:(3-phospho-D-glycerate-carboxy-lyase (dimerizing))-lysine 6-N-methyltransferase =

S-adenosyl-L-methionine:(3-phospho-D-glycerate-carboxy-lyase (dimerizing))-lysine 6-N-methyltransferase may refer to:

- (Ribulose-bisphosphate carboxylase)-lysine N-methyltransferase, an enzyme
- (Fructose-bisphosphate aldolase)-lysine N-methyltransferase, an enzyme
