= CFAP68 =

Protein-coding gene in the species Homo sapiens

An Error has occurred retrieving Wikidata item for infobox

Chromosome 11 open reading frame one, also known as C11orf1, is a protein-coding gene. It has been found by yeast two hybrid screen to bind to SETDB1 a histone protein methyltransferase enzyme. SETDB1 has been implicated in Huntington's disease, a neurodegenerative disorder.

C11orf1 is a nuclear protein with unknown function but has been shown to show preferential expression in some disease states in microarray data.

== Species distribution ==
C11orf1 shows conservation through mammals and orthologs can be found in sea squirts and sea anemone. The below table shows some orthologs found using BLAST.

Species	Organism Common Name	NCBI Accession	Sequence identity	Expected value	Length (AAs)	Gene Common Name
Homo sapiens	Human	CAG33659	100%	8e^{−86}	150	C11orf1
Bos taurus	Bovine	NP_001033266.1	85%	1e^{−70}	149	UPF0686 protein C11orf1 homolog
Canis lupus familiaris	Dog	XP_536577.1	88%	3e^{−68}	485	PREDICTED: hypothetical protein XP_536577 [Canis familiaris]
Mus musculus	Mouse	NP_075972.2	78%	4e^{−65}	466	hypothetical protein LOC68721 [Mus musculus]
Ciona intestinalis	Sea Squirt	XP_002127073.1	49%	3e^{−23}	156	PREDICTED: similar to predicted protein [Ciona intestinalis]

== Gene ==
C11orf1 is located on chromosome 11 and is neighbored by:

- FDXACB1-201
- ALG9-201
- ALG9-202
- AP001781.5-201

== Protein ==
=== Structure ===
This protein is part of the UPF0686 superfamily. This family is characterized by the presence of a domain of unknown function (DUF)1143 shared by the family. This family DUF1143 has a domain that includes almost all 149 of the 150 amino acids in the human ortholog. C11orf1 has six splicesomal variants and one unspliced variant.

=== Predicted properties ===
The following properties of C11orf1 were predicted using bioinformatic analysis:

- Molecular Weight: 17.76 KDal
- Isoelectric point: 7.28
- Post-translational modification: twelve possible post-translational modifications are predicted:
  - Two O-(N-acetylaminogalactosyl)-L-threonine Glycosylations at position 138 and 142 on the protein sequence
  - Two O-phospho-L-serine Phosphorylation sites at 112 and 141.
  - Four O-phospho-L-threonine Phosphorylation sites at 59, 99, 113, and 138.
  - Four O4'-phospho-L-tyrosine Phosphorylation sites at 64, 101, 105 and 143.

=== Tissue distribution ===
C11orf1 appears to be ubiquitously expressed at low levels but particularly high expression in the parathyroid. Expression data indicate expression in most tissues. This gene has also been found in one experiment to be under expressed in Huntington's disease patients while SETDB1 is over-expressed.

=== Binding partners ===
The human protein SET domain bifurcated 1, was found to be a binding partner for C11orf1 by Yeast Two Hybrid.
