= KMT5B =

Protein-coding gene in the species Homo sapiens

Identifiers
- Aliases: KMT5B, CGI85, CGI-85, SUV420H1, lysine methyltransferase 5B, MRD51
- External IDs: OMIM: 610881; MGI: 2444557; GeneCards: KMT5B
Available structures
PDB	Ortholog search: PDBe RCSB
PDB	List of PDB id codes 3S8P
Enzyme activity
EC #	BRENDA	ExPASy	KEGG	MetaCyc
2.1.1.361	↗	↗	↗	↗
2.1.1.362	↗	↗	↗	↗

Gene location (Human)
Chr.	Chromosome 11 (human)
Band	11q13.2	Start	68,154,863 bp
Band	11q13.2	End	68,213,828 bp

Gene location (Mouse)
Chr.	Chromosome 19 (mouse)
Band	19|19 A	Start	3,767,421 bp
Band	19|19 A	End	3,818,303 bp
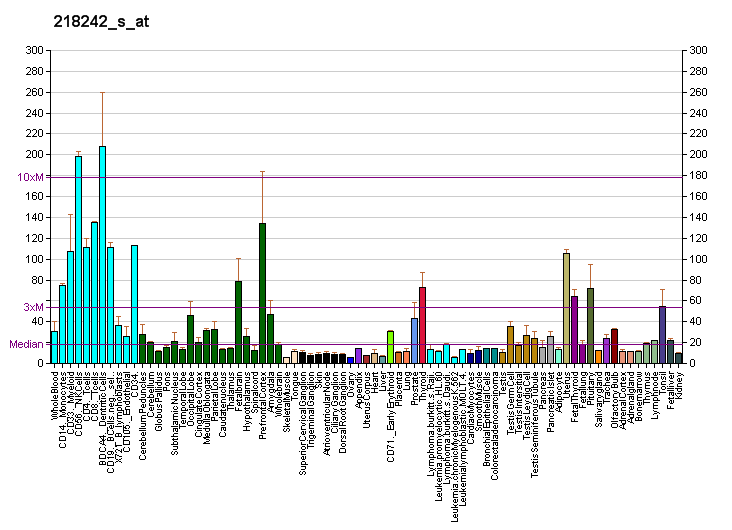
RNA expression pattern
Bgee	Human / Mouse (ortholog); Top expressed in: mucosa of paranasal sinus; visceral pleura; caput epididymis; sperm; pylorus; ganglionic eminence; cardia; ventricular zone; parietal pleura; superior surface of tongue / Top expressed in: tail of embryo; genital tubercle; neural layer of retina; granulocyte; interventricular septum; ganglionic eminence; ventricular zone; Rostral migratory stream; superior cervical ganglion; thymus; More reference expression data
BioGPS	More reference expression data
Gene ontology
Molecular function	methyltransferase activity; transferase activity; histone methyltransferase activity (H4-K20 specific); histone-lysine N-methyltransferase activity; protein binding
Cellular component	chromosome; nucleus; nucleoplasm
Biological process	histone H4-K20 trimethylation; muscle organ development; histone methylation; methylation; regulation of transcription, DNA-templated; transcription, DNA-templated; chromatin organization
Sources:Amigo / QuickGO
Orthologs
Databases	NCBI: entry; OMA: entry
Species	Human	Mouse
Entrez	51111	225888
Ensembl	ENSG00000110066	ENSMUSG00000045098
UniProt	Q4FZB7	Q3U8K7
RefSeq (mRNA)	NM_001300907; NM_001300908; NM_001300909; NM_016028; NM_017635 NM_001363566	NM_001167884; NM_001167885; NM_001167886; NM_001167887; NM_001167888 NM_001167889; NM_144871; NM_001379678; NM_001379679; NM_001379680
RefSeq (protein)	NP_001287836; NP_001287837; NP_001287838; NP_057112; NP_060105 NP_001350495; NP_001356353; NP_001356354; NP_001356355; NP_001356356; NP_001356357; NP_001356358; NP_001356359; NP_001356360; NP_001356361; NP_001356362	NP_001161356; NP_001161357; NP_001161358; NP_001161359; NP_001161360 NP_001161361; NP_659120; NP_001366607; NP_001366608; NP_001366609
Location (UCSC)	Chr 11: 68.15 – 68.21 Mb	Chr 19: 3.77 – 3.82 Mb
PubMed search
- Wikidata
View/Edit Human	View/Edit Mouse

Histone-lysine N-methyltransferase KMT5B is an enzyme that in humans is encoded by the KMT5B gene. The enzyme along with NSD2 is responsible for dimethylation of lysine 20 on histone H4 in mouse and humans.

This gene encodes a protein that contains a SET domain. SET domains appear to be protein-protein interaction domains that mediate interactions with a family of proteins that display similarity with dual-specificity phosphatases (dsPTPases). Two alternatively spliced transcript variants have been found for this gene.

== Role in pathology ==
Mutations of the KMT5B gene cause autosomal dominant intellectual developmental disorder 51, a condition first described in 2017 by Stessman et al.
