= ASH1L =

Protein found in humans

Identifiers
- Aliases: ASH1L, ASH1, ASH1L1, KMT2H, ASH1 like histone lysine methyltransferase, MRD52
- External IDs: OMIM: 607999; MGI: 2183158; GeneCards: ASH1L
Available structures
PDB	Ortholog search: PDBe RCSB
PDB	List of PDB id codes 3MQM, 3OPE, 4YNM, 4YNP, 4YPA, 4YPE, 4YPU
Enzyme activity
EC #	BRENDA	ExPASy	KEGG	MetaCyc
2.1.1.359	↗	↗	↗	↗
2.1.1.367	↗	↗	↗	↗

Gene location (Human)
Chr.	Chromosome 1 (human)
Band	1q22	Start	155,335,268 bp
Band	1q22	End	155,563,162 bp

Gene location (Mouse)
Chr.	Chromosome 3 (mouse)
Band	3|3 F1	Start	88,857,929 bp
Band	3|3 F1	End	88,986,682 bp
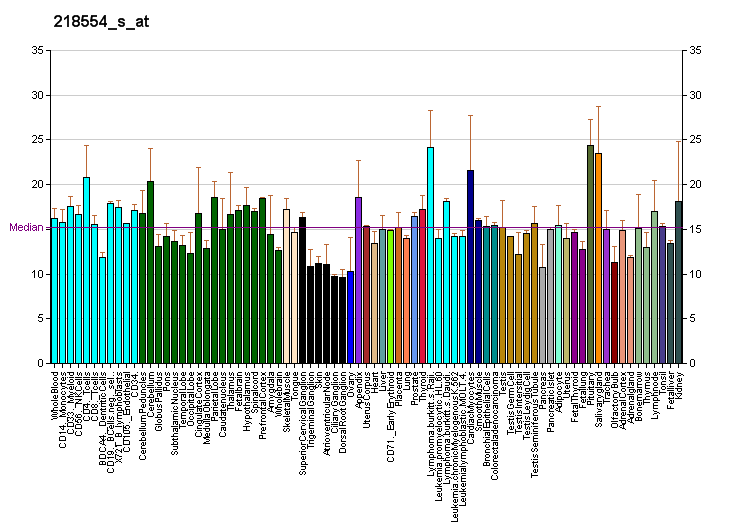
RNA expression pattern
Bgee	Human / Mouse (ortholog); Top expressed in: Brodmann area 23; pylorus; cardia; cerebellar vermis; middle temporal gyrus; nipple; postcentral gyrus; visceral pleura; renal medulla; endothelial cell / Top expressed in: ciliary body; Rostral migratory stream; aortic valve; ascending aorta; lateral septal nucleus; retinal pigment epithelium; cingulate gyrus; cerebellar vermis; anterior amygdaloid area; lobe of cerebellum; More reference expression data
BioGPS	More reference expression data
Gene ontology
Molecular function	methyltransferase activity; transferase activity; DNA binding; chromatin binding; histone methyltransferase activity (H3-K4 specific); metal ion binding; histone methyltransferase activity (H3-K36 specific); histone-lysine N-methyltransferase activity; DNA-binding transcription factor activity, RNA polymerase II-specific; histone methyltransferase activity (H3-K9 specific)
Cellular component	Golgi apparatus; bicellular tight junction; chromosome; cell junction; nucleus; nucleoplasm
Biological process	regulation of transcription, DNA-templated; negative regulation of acute inflammatory response; histone H3-K36 dimethylation; interleukin-6 production; cell-cell signaling; transcription by RNA polymerase II; negative regulation of I-kappaB kinase/NF-kappaB signaling; transcription, DNA-templated; histone H3-K4 methylation; methylation; negative regulation of MAPK cascade; negative regulation of inflammatory response; positive regulation of transcription by RNA polymerase II; skeletal system development; single fertilization; post-embryonic development; regulation of gene expression; decidualization; sebaceous gland development; uterus morphogenesis; sperm motility; tarsal gland development; uterine gland development; chromatin organization; flagellated sperm motility; histone H3-K9 methylation
Sources:Amigo / QuickGO
Orthologs
Databases	NCBI: entry; OMA: entry
Species	Human	Mouse
Entrez	55870	192195
Ensembl	ENSG00000116539	ENSMUSG00000028053
UniProt	Q9NR48	Q99MY8
RefSeq (mRNA)	NM_018489; NM_001366177	NM_138679
RefSeq (protein)	NP_060959; NP_001353106	NP_619620
Location (UCSC)	Chr 1: 155.34 – 155.56 Mb	Chr 3: 88.86 – 88.99 Mb
PubMed search
- Wikidata
View/Edit Human	View/Edit Mouse

ASH1L.ORG

ASH1L (also called huASH1, ASH1, ASH1L1, ASH1-like, or KMT2H) is a histone-lysine N-methyltransferase enzyme encoded by the ASH1L gene located at chromosomal band 1q22. ASH1L is the human homolog of Drosophila Ash1 (absent, small, or homeotic-like).

== Gene ==
Ash1 was discovered as a gene causing an imaginal disc mutant phenotype in Drosophila. Ash1 is a member of the trithorax-group (trxG) of proteins, a group of transcriptional activators that are involved in regulating Hox gene expression and body segment identity. Drosophila Ash1 interacts with trithorax to regulate ultrabithorax expression.

The human ASH1L gene spans 227.5 kb on chromosome 1, band q22. This region is rearranged in a variety of human cancers such as leukemia, non-Hodgkin's lymphoma, and some solid tumors. The gene is expressed in multiple tissues, with highest levels in brain, kidney, and heart, as a 10.5-kb mRNA transcript. Mutations in ASH1L in humans have been associated with autism, epilepsy, and intellectual disability.

== Structure ==
Human ASH1L protein is 2969 amino acids long with a molecular weight of 333 kDa. ASH1L has an associated with SET domain (AWS), a SET domain, a post-set domain, a bromodomain, a bromo-adjacent homology domain, and a plant homeodomain finger (PHD finger). Human and Drosophila Ash1 share 66% and 77% similarity in their SET and PHD finger domains, respectively. A bromodomain is not present in Drosophila Ash1.

The SET domain is responsible for ASH1L's histone methyltransferase (HMTase) activity. Unlike other proteins that contain a SET domain at their C terminus, ASH1L has a SET domain in the middle of the protein. The crystal structure of the human ASH1L catalytic domain, including the AWS, SET, and post-SET domains, has been solved to 2.9 angstrom resolution. The structure shows that the substrate binding pocket is blocked by a loop from the post-SET domain, and because mutation of the loop stimulates ASH1L HMTase activity, it was proposed that this loop serves a regulatory role.

== Protein expression patterns and timing ==
ASH1L is ubiquitously expressed throughout the body. In the brain, ASH1L is expressed across brain areas and cell types, including excitatory and inhibitory neurons, astrocytes, oligodendrocytes, and microglia. ASH1L also does not appear to show specificity to any brain region. In humans, ASH1L mRNA expression levels are fairly equal across all regions of cortex. Similarly, in mice, ASH1L protein is highly expressed in the hippocampus, thalamus, hypothalamus, motor cortex, and basolateral amygdala. In humans, ASH1L expression peaks prenatally and decreases after birth, with a second peak in expression towards adulthood. In mouse, ASH1L is expressed in the developing central nervous system as early as embryonic day 8.5 and is still expressed throughout the adult mouse brain. Overall, the expression of ASH1L in the brain is spatially and temporally broad.

== Function ==
The ASH1L protein is localized to intranuclear speckles and tight junctions, where it was hypothesized to function in adhesion-mediated signaling. ChIP analysis demonstrated that ASH1L binds to the 5'-transcribed region of actively transcribed genes. The chromatin occupancy of ASH1L mirrors that of the TrxG-related H3K4-HMTase MLL1; however, ASH1L's association with chromatin can occur independently of MLL1. While ASH1L binds to the 5'-transcribed region of housekeeping genes, it is distributed across the entire transcribed region of Hox genes. ASH1L is required for maximal expression and H3K4 methylation of HOXA6 and HOXA10.

A Hox promoter reporter construct in HeLa cells requires both MLL1 and ASH1L for activation, whereas MLL1 or ASH1L alone are not sufficient to activate transcription. The methyltransferase activity of ASH1L is not required for Hox gene activation but instead has repressive action. Knockdown of ASH1L in K562 cells causes up-regulation of the ε-globin gene and down-regulation of myelomonocytic markers GPIIb and GPIIIa, and knockdown of ASH1L in lineage marker-negative hematopoietic progenitor cells skews differentiation from myelomonocytic towards lymphoid or erythroid lineages. These results imply that ASH1L, like MLL1, facilitates myelomonocytic differentiation of hematopoietic stem cells.

The in vivo target for ASH1L's HMTase activity has been a topic of some controversy. Blobel's group found that in vitro ASH1L methylates H3K4 peptides, and the distribution of ASH1L across transcribed genes resembles that of H3K4 levels. In contrast, two other groups have found that ASH1L's HMTase activity is directed toward H3K36, using nucleosomes as substrate.

== Role in human disease ==
There are over 100 reported pathogenic, or disease-causing, variants in the ASH1L gene. About half of the variants arise de novo, and half are inherited. Of the inherited variants, about half are maternally inherited and half are paternally inherited. Disease-causing variants may be missense, nonsense, or frameshift mutations. The missense mutations are distributed throughout the gene body without localizing to a known functional domain of ASH1L.

All affected humans are heterozygous for ASH1L mutations. A single pathogenic copy of ASH1L causes disease, which may be the result of two different genetic mechanisms: haploinsufficiency or dominant negative function. The ClinGen clinical genomics resource states that there is "Sufficient Evidence for Haploinsufficiency" in ASH1L.

The most common phenotypes, or symptoms, related to ASH1L mutations are autism spectrum disorder (ASD), epilepsy, intellectual disability, and attention deficit hyperactivity disorder (ADHD). The Simons Foundation Autism Research Initiative (SFARI) gives ASH1L a score of 1.1, indicating that ASH1L is a high confidence autism gene with the best level of evidence linking it to autism.
