= SETD3 (gene) =

Identifiers
- Aliases: SETD3, C14orf154, SET domain containing 3, SET domain containing 3, actin histidine methyltransferase, hSETD3
- External IDs: OMIM: 615671; MGI: 1289184; GeneCards: SETD3
Available structures
PDB	Ortholog search: PDBe RCSB
PDB	List of PDB id codes 3SMT
Enzyme activity
EC #	BRENDA	ExPASy	KEGG	MetaCyc
2.1.1.85	↗	↗	↗	↗

Gene location (Human)
Chr.	Chromosome 14 (human)
Band	14q32.2	Start	99,397,748 bp
Band	14q32.2	End	99,480,889 bp

Gene location (Mouse)
Chr.	Chromosome 12 (mouse)
Band	12 F1|12 59.23 cM	Start	108,072,690 bp
Band	12 F1|12 59.23 cM	End	108,145,573 bp
RNA expression pattern
Bgee	Human / Mouse (ortholog); Top expressed in: Achilles tendon; gastrocnemius muscle; kidney tubule; muscle of thigh; beta cell; Skeletal muscle tissue of rectus abdominis; parotid gland; thoracic diaphragm; biceps brachii; corpus epididymis / Top expressed in: muscle of thigh; quadriceps femoris muscle; superior frontal gyrus; cerebellar cortex; primary visual cortex; muscle tissue; dentate gyrus of hippocampal formation granule cell; hippocampus proper; hypothalamus; skeletal muscle tissue; More reference expression data
BioGPS	n/a
Gene ontology
Molecular function	methyltransferase activity; transferase activity; histone methyltransferase activity (H3-K4 specific); histone-lysine N-methyltransferase activity; histone methyltransferase activity (H3-K36 specific); transcription coactivator activity; protein-lysine N-methyltransferase activity
Cellular component	nucleoplasm; nucleus
Biological process	regulation of transcription, DNA-templated; positive regulation of muscle cell differentiation; transcription, DNA-templated; positive regulation of transcription, DNA-templated; peptidyl-lysine methylation; methylation; positive regulation of transcription by RNA polymerase II; peptidyl-lysine dimethylation; peptidyl-lysine trimethylation; histone H3-K36 methylation; peptidyl-lysine monomethylation; histone H3-K4 methylation; chromatin organization
Sources:Amigo / QuickGO
Orthologs
Databases	NCBI: entry; OMA: entry
Species	Human	Mouse
Entrez	84193	52690
Ensembl	ENSG00000183576	ENSMUSG00000056770
UniProt	Q86TU7	Q91WC0
RefSeq (mRNA)	NM_032233; NM_199123	NM_028262; NM_001364266; NM_001364267; NM_001364268; NM_001364269 NM_001364270
RefSeq (protein)	NP_115609; NP_954574	NP_082538; NP_001351195; NP_001351196; NP_001351197; NP_001351198 NP_001351199
Location (UCSC)	Chr 14: 99.4 – 99.48 Mb	Chr 12: 108.07 – 108.15 Mb
PubMed search
- Wikidata
View/Edit Human	View/Edit Mouse

SET domain containing 3 (SETD3) is a protein that in humans is encoded by the SETD3 gene. It is a methyl transferase implicated in the replication of all enteroviruses. A mouse line deficient in SETD3 expression was shown to be immune to enterovirus infection. This could pave the way for the prevention of diseases like the common cold, myocarditis, aseptic meningitis and polio. SETD3 is capable of methylating the cytoskeletal protein actin on histidine residues.

In patients of the Estrogen Receptor-positive, and Luminal A-type breast cancer classification, a high expression of SETD3 is associated with better relapse-free survival, whereas in patients lacking expression of estrogen-, progesterone- and HER2/neu-receptor, and those affected by a p53-mutation, SETD3 was associated with poor relapse-free survival.

Downregulation of SETD3 expression with small interfering RNA resulted in an inhibition of cytoskeletal function and invasiveness of triple-negative breast cancer cells.

== See also ==
- Methyltransferase
- Histone methyltransferase
