= SETMAR =

Protein-coding gene in the species Homo sapiens

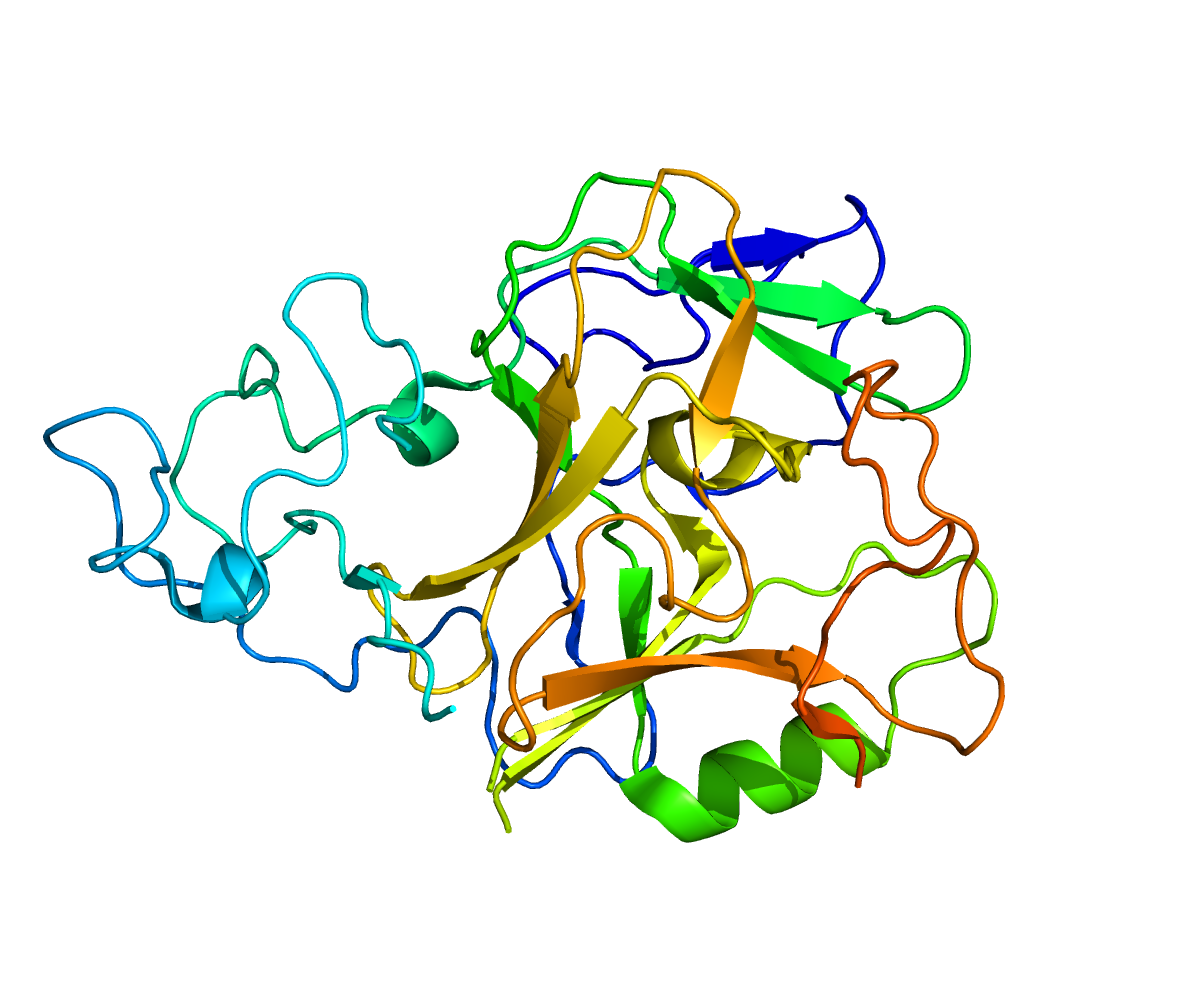

Identifiers
- Aliases: SETMAR, HsMar1, METNASE, Mar1, SET domain and mariner transposase fusion gene
- External IDs: OMIM: 609834; GeneCards: SETMAR
Available structures
PDB	Human UniProt search: PDBe RCSB
PDB	List of PDB id codes 3BO5, 3F2K, 3K9J, 3K9K
Enzyme activity
EC #	BRENDA	ExPASy	KEGG	MetaCyc
2.1.1.357	↗	↗	↗	↗

Gene location (Human)
Chr.	Chromosome 3 (human)
Band	3p26.1	Start	4,303,332 bp
Band	3p26.1	End	4,317,265 bp
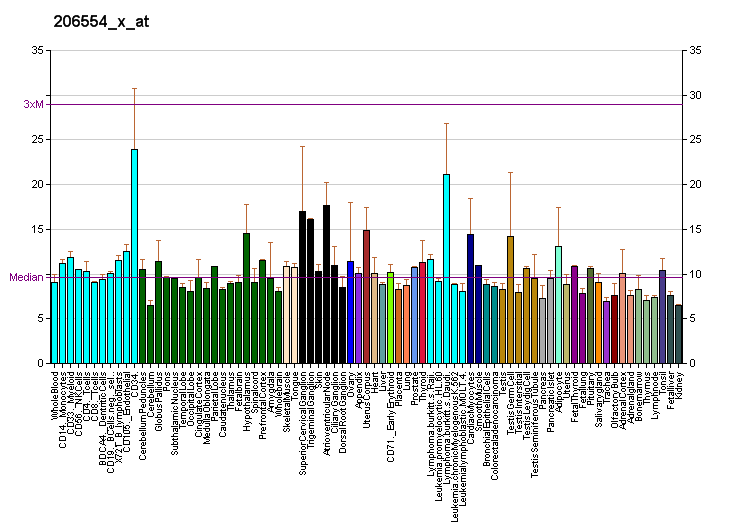
RNA expression pattern
Bgee	Human / Mouse (ortholog); Top expressed in: body of uterus; popliteal artery; tibial arteries; left uterine tube; left ovary; right coronary artery; Descending thoracic aorta; gastric mucosa; right ovary; left coronary artery / n/a; More reference expression data
BioGPS	More reference expression data
Gene ontology
Molecular function	methyltransferase activity; transferase activity; protein homodimerization activity; zinc ion binding; histone methyltransferase activity (H3-K4 specific); histone-lysine N-methyltransferase activity; metal ion binding; single-stranded DNA binding; single-stranded DNA endodeoxyribonuclease activity; DNA topoisomerase binding; protein binding; catalytic activity; nuclease activity; endonuclease activity; histone methyltransferase activity (H3-K36 specific); double-stranded DNA binding; hydrolase activity; DNA binding
Cellular component	site of double-strand break; chromosome; condensed chromosome; nucleus; nucleolus
Biological process	histone H3-K36 dimethylation; DNA integration; nucleic acid phosphodiester bond hydrolysis; positive regulation of DNA topoisomerase (ATP-hydrolyzing) activity; DNA double-strand break processing; positive regulation of double-strand break repair via nonhomologous end joining; DNA catabolic process, endonucleolytic; cellular response to DNA damage stimulus; histone H3-K36 methylation; histone H3-K4 methylation; methylation; replication fork processing; histone lysine methylation; mitotic DNA integrity checkpoint signaling; metabolism; cell population proliferation; double-strand break repair via nonhomologous end joining; negative regulation of chromosome organization; DNA repair; chromatin organization
Sources:Amigo / QuickGO
Orthologs
Databases	NCBI: entry; OMA: entry
Species	Human	Mouse
Entrez	6419	n/a
Ensembl	ENSG00000170364	n/a
UniProt	Q53H47	n/a
RefSeq (mRNA)	NM_001243723; NM_001276325; NM_006515; NM_001320676; NM_001320677 NM_001320678	n/a
RefSeq (protein)	NP_001230652; NP_001263254; NP_001307605; NP_001307606; NP_001307607 NP_006506	n/a
Location (UCSC)	Chr 3: 4.3 – 4.32 Mb	n/a
PubMed search		n/a
- Wikidata
View/Edit Human

Histone-lysine N-methyltransferase SETMAR is an enzyme that in humans is encoded by the SETMAR gene.

== Function ==
SETMAR contains a SET domain that confers its histone methyltransferase activity, on Lys-4 and Lys-36 of Histone H3, both of which are specific tags for epigenetic activation. It has been identified as a repair protein as it mediates dimethylation at Lys-36 at double-strand break locations, a signal enhancing NHEJ repair.

Anthropoid primates, including humans, have a version of the protein fused to a Mariner/Tc1 transposase. This fusion region provides the DNA-binding abilities for the protein as well as some nuclease activity. The transposase activity is lost due to the presence of several inactivating mutations, including the D610N mutation. However, the domesticated transposase domain retains its ability to bind to the mariner repeat elements in the genome. SETMAR has been found to affect the expression and splicing of genes close to or containing mariner repeat elements via its functions in histone methylation. Both the SET, via its methyltransferase activity, and the mariner, with its DNA-binding and nuclease activities, domains of SETMAR have been shown to act in non-homologous end joining (NHEJ) to repair DNA double strand breaks.
