= PHD finger =

PHD-finger
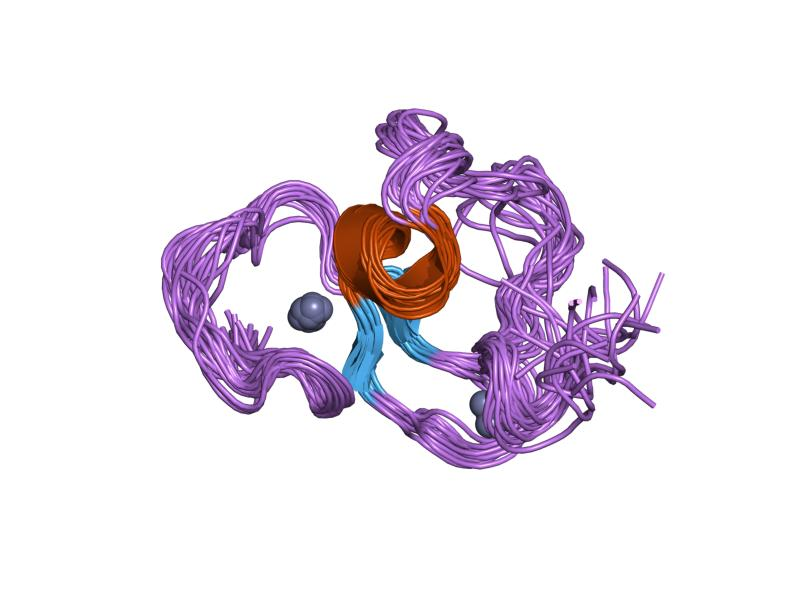
- PHD zinc finger. Zinc atoms shown in grey

Identifiers
- Symbol: PHD
- Pfam: PF00628
- Pfam clan: CL0390
- InterPro: IPR019787
- PROSITE: PS50016
- SCOP2: 1f62 / SCOPe / SUPFAM
- OPM superfamily: 59
- OPM protein: 1vfy
Available protein structures:
- Pfam: structures / ECOD
- PDB: RCSB PDB; PDBe; PDBj
- PDBsum: structure summary

The PHD finger was discovered in 1993 as a Cys_{4}-His-Cys_{3} motif in the plant homeodomain (hence PHD) proteins HAT3.1 in Arabidopsis and maize ZmHox1a. The PHD zinc finger motif resembles the metal binding RING domain (Cys_{3}-His-Cys_{4}) and FYVE domain. It occurs as a single finger, but often in clusters of two or three, and it also occurs together with other domains, such as the chromodomain and the bromodomain.

== Role in epigenetics ==
The PHD finger, approximately 50-80 amino acids in length, is found in more than 100 human proteins. Several of the proteins it occurs in are found in the nucleus, and are involved in chromatin-mediated gene regulation. The PHD finger occurs in proteins such as the transcriptional co-activators p300 and CBP, Polycomb-like protein (Pcl), Trithorax-group proteins like ASH1L, ASH2L and MLL, the autoimmune regulator (AIRE), Mi-2 complex (part of histone deacetylase complex), the co-repressor TIF1, the JARID1-family of demethylases and many more.

== Structure ==
The NMR structure of the PHD finger from human WSTF (Williams Syndrome Transcription Factor) shows that the conserved cysteines and histidine coordinate two Zn^{2+} ions. In general, the PHD finger adopts a globular fold, consisting of a two-stranded beta-sheet and an alpha-helix. The region consisting of these secondary structures and the residues involved in coordinating the zinc-ions are very conserved among species. The loop regions I and II are variable and could contribute functional specificity to the different PHD fingers.

== Function ==
The PHD fingers of some proteins, including ING2, YNG1 and NURF, have been reported to bind to histone H3 tri-methylated on lysine 4 (H3K4me3), while other PHD fingers have tested negative in such assays. A protein called KDM5C has a PHD finger, which has been reported to bind histone H3 tri-methylated lysine 9 (H3K9me3). Based on these publications, binding to tri-methylated lysines on histones may therefore be a property widespread among PHD fingers. Domains that bind to modified histones, are called epigenetic readers as they specifically recognize the modified version of the residue and binds to it. The modification H3K4me3 is associated with the transcription start site of active genes, while H3K9me3 is associated with inactive genes. The modifications of the histone lysines are dynamic, as there are methylases that add methyl groups to the lysines, and there are demethylases that remove methyl groups. KDM5C is a histone H3 lysine 4 demethylase, which means it is an enzyme that can remove the methyl groups of lysine 4 on histone 3 (making it H3K4me2 or H3K4me1). One can only speculate if the H3K9me3-binding of KDM5C PHD domain provides a crosstalk between trimethylation of H3K9 and the demethylation of H3K4me3. Such crosstalks have been suggested earlier with other domains involved in chromatin regulation, and may provide a strictly coordinated regulation.

Another example is the PHD finger of the BHC80/PHF21A protein, which is a component of the LSD1 complex. In this complex, LSD1 specifically demethylates H3K4me2 to H3K4me0, and BHC80 binds H3K4me0 through its PHD finger to stabilize the complex at its target promoters, presumably to prevent further re-methylation. This is the first example of a PHD finger recognizing lysine methyl-zero status.
