= SETD1A =

Protein

Identifiers
- Aliases: SETD1A, KMT2F, Set1, Set1A, SET domain containing 1A, SET domain containing 1A, histone lysine methyltransferase, EPEDD, NEDSID
- External IDs: OMIM: 611052; MGI: 2446244; GeneCards: SETD1A
Available structures
PDB	Ortholog search: PDBe RCSB
PDB	List of PDB id codes 3S8S, 3UVN, 4EWR
Enzyme activity
EC #	BRENDA	ExPASy	KEGG	MetaCyc
2.1.1.364	↗	↗	↗	↗

Gene location (Human)
Chr.	Chromosome 16 (human)
Band	16p11.2	Start	30,957,754 bp
Band	16p11.2	End	30,984,664 bp

Gene location (Mouse)
Chr.	Chromosome 7 (mouse)
Band	7|7 F3	Start	127,375,842 bp
Band	7|7 F3	End	127,399,294 bp
RNA expression pattern
Bgee	Human / Mouse (ortholog); Top expressed in: paraflocculus of cerebellum; sural nerve; parotid gland; middle frontal gyrus; Brodmann area 10; right testis; left testis; dorsal motor nucleus of vagus nerve; granulocyte; gastrocnemius muscle / Top expressed in: tail of embryo; genital tubercle; secondary oocyte; zygote; Rostral migratory stream; tibiofemoral joint; neural layer of retina; cumulus cell; muscle of thigh; ventricular zone; More reference expression data
BioGPS	n/a
Gene ontology
Molecular function	methyltransferase activity; transferase activity; beta-catenin binding; protein binding; RNA binding; nucleic acid binding; histone-lysine N-methyltransferase activity; transcription factor binding; histone methyltransferase activity (H3-K4 specific); euchromatin binding
Cellular component	chromosome; nucleus; histone methyltransferase complex; nucleoplasm; nuclear speck; Set1C/COMPASS complex
Biological process	regulation of transcription, DNA-templated; transcription, DNA-templated; methylation; histone H3-K4 methylation; regulation of hematopoietic stem cell differentiation; regulation of megakaryocyte differentiation; histone lysine methylation; regulation of chromatin organization; chromatin organization; positive regulation of gene expression; stem cell population maintenance; regulation of erythrocyte differentiation; positive regulation of neural precursor cell proliferation; positive regulation of stem cell proliferation
Sources:Amigo / QuickGO
Orthologs
Databases	NCBI: entry; OMA: entry
Species	Human	Mouse
Entrez	9739	233904
Ensembl	ENSG00000099381	ENSMUSG00000042308
UniProt	O15047	E9PYH6
RefSeq (mRNA)	NM_014712	NM_010940; NM_178029
RefSeq (protein)	NP_055527	NP_821172
Location (UCSC)	Chr 16: 30.96 – 30.98 Mb	Chr 7: 127.38 – 127.4 Mb
PubMed search
- Wikidata
View/Edit Human	View/Edit Mouse

Histone-lysine N-methyltransferase SETD1A is a protein that serves as a component of a histone methyltransferase (HMT) complex that produces mono-, di-, and trimethylated histone H3 at the lysine 4 residue (K4). SETD1A is highly homologous with SETDB1 but has a distinct subnuclear distribution.

== Clinical significance ==
Mutations of the SETD1A gene can cause neurodevelopmental disorder with speech impairment and dysmorphic facies (NEDSID) discovered in 2021, and early-onset epilepsy with or without developmental delay, first described in 2019.

According to a review published in 2018, mutations of the SETD1A gene may increase the risk of schizophrenia, based on studies available up to that date. A later review from 2024 found that SETD1A mutations been associated with development of schizophrenia at a later age. Loss of function (LoF) variants in SETD1A and epigenetic dysregulations of the gene are therefore thought to play an important role in the pathogenesis of schizophrenia.

== History ==
The protein was first described in man in 2003 by Wysocka et al.

== See also ==
- Methyllysine
- SETDB1 - highly homologous to SETD1A
- SET domain
