= NSD2 =

Protein-coding gene in the species Homo sapiens

Identifiers
- Aliases: NSD2, MMSET, REIIBP, TRX5, WHS, WHSC1, Wolf-Hirschhorn syndrome candidate 1, nuclear receptor binding SET domain protein 2, KMT3G, KMT3F, RAUST
- External IDs: OMIM: 602952; MGI: 1276574; GeneCards: NSD2
Enzyme activity
EC #	BRENDA	ExPASy	KEGG	MetaCyc
2.1.1.357	↗	↗	↗	↗

Gene location (Human)
Chr.	Chromosome 4 (human)
Band	4p16.3	Start	1,871,393 bp
Band	4p16.3	End	1,982,207 bp

Gene location (Mouse)
Chr.	Chromosome 5 (mouse)
Band	5|5 B2	Start	33,978,069 bp
Band	5|5 B2	End	34,055,319 bp
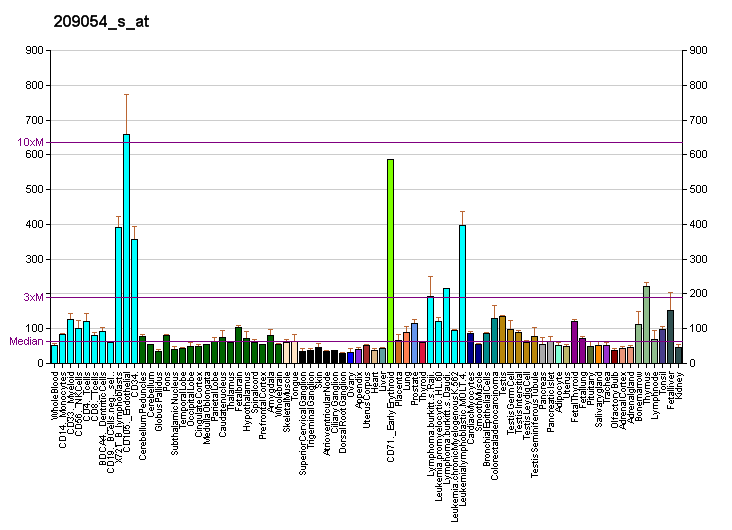

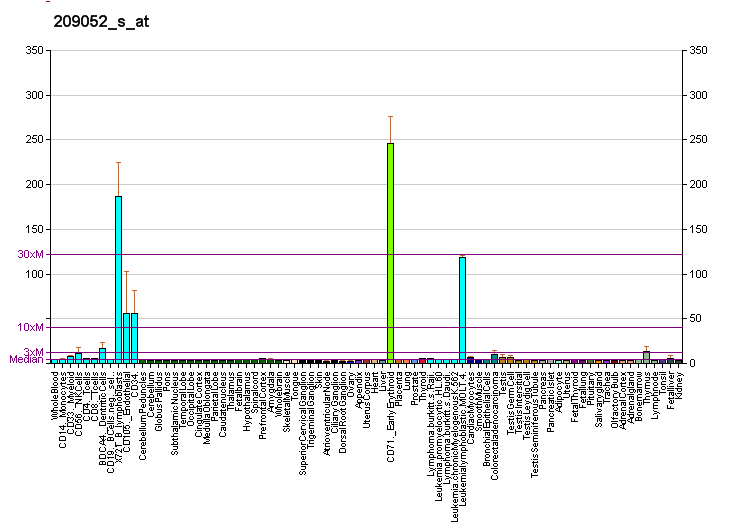
RNA expression pattern
Bgee	Human / Mouse (ortholog); Top expressed in: ventricular zone; ganglionic eminence; sural nerve; right testis; left testis; secondary oocyte; bone marrow cell; male germ cell; stromal cell of endometrium; sperm / Top expressed in: hand; superior cervical ganglion; otic vesicle; ventricular zone; tail of embryo; yolk sac; lateral septal nucleus; ganglionic eminence; genital tubercle; lateral geniculate nucleus; More reference expression data
BioGPS	More reference expression data
Gene ontology
Molecular function	methyltransferase activity; transferase activity; sequence-specific DNA binding; DNA binding; histone methyltransferase activity (H4-K20 specific); chromatin binding; metal ion binding; protein binding; histone-lysine N-methyltransferase activity; DNA-binding transcription factor activity, RNA polymerase II-specific; histone methyltransferase activity (H3-K36 specific)
Cellular component	cytoplasm; nucleoplasm; chromosome; nucleus; chromatin
Biological process	regulation of transcription, DNA-templated; regulation of double-strand break repair via nonhomologous end joining; membranous septum morphogenesis; anatomical structure morphogenesis; negative regulation of transcription by RNA polymerase II; transcription, DNA-templated; histone H3-K36 methylation; atrial septum secundum morphogenesis; methylation; atrial septum primum morphogenesis; regulation of establishment of protein localization; positive regulation of isotype switching to IgA isotypes; histone H4-K20 methylation; bone development; double-strand break repair via nonhomologous end joining; chromatin organization
Sources:Amigo / QuickGO
Orthologs
Databases	NCBI: entry; OMA: entry
Species	Human	Mouse
Entrez	7468	107823
Ensembl	ENSG00000109685	ENSMUSG00000057406
UniProt	O96028	Q8BVE8
RefSeq (mRNA)	NM_001042424; NM_007331; NM_014919; NM_133330; NM_133331 NM_133332; NM_133333; NM_133334; NM_133335; NM_133336	NM_001081102; NM_001177884; NM_175231
RefSeq (protein)	NP_001035889; NP_015627; NP_579877; NP_579878; NP_579889 NP_579890	NP_001074571; NP_001171355; NP_780440
Location (UCSC)	Chr 4: 1.87 – 1.98 Mb	Chr 5: 33.98 – 34.06 Mb
PubMed search
- Wikidata
View/Edit Human	View/Edit Mouse

Probable histone-lysine N-methyltransferase NSD2 is an enzyme that in humans is encoded by the NSD2 gene.

This gene encodes a protein that contains several domain types present in other developmental proteins: PWWP domains, an HMG box, a SET domains, several PHD-type zinc fingers and a terminal C5HCH motif. It is expressed ubiquitously in early development.

Wolf-Hirschhorn syndrome (WHS) is a malformation syndrome associated with a hemizygous deletion of the distal short arm of chromosome 4. This gene maps to the 165 kb WHS critical region and has also been involved in the chromosomal translocation t(4;14)(p16.3;q32.3) in multiple myelomas.

Alternative splicing of this gene results in multiple transcript variants encoding different isoforms. Some transcript variants are nonsense-mediated mRNA (NMD) decay candidates, hence not represented as reference sequences.
