= SMYD2 =

Human protein-coding gene

Identifiers
- Aliases: SMYD2, HSKM-B, KMT3C, ZMYND14, SET and MYND domain containing 2
- External IDs: OMIM: 610663; MGI: 1915889; GeneCards: SMYD2
Available structures
PDB	Ortholog search: PDBe RCSB
PDB	List of PDB id codes 3RIB, 3S7B, 3S7D, 3S7F, 3S7J, 3TG4, 3TG5, 4O6F, 4WUY, 4YND, 5ARF, 5ARG
Enzyme activity
EC #	BRENDA	ExPASy	KEGG	MetaCyc
2.1.1.354	↗	↗	↗	↗

Gene location (Human)
Chr.	Chromosome 1 (human)
Band	1q32.3	Start	214,281,102 bp
Band	1q32.3	End	214,337,131 bp

Gene location (Mouse)
Chr.	Chromosome 1 (mouse)
Band	1|1 H6	Start	189,612,689 bp
Band	1|1 H6	End	189,654,560 bp
RNA expression pattern
Bgee	Human / Mouse (ortholog); Top expressed in: myocardium of left ventricle; right ventricle; apex of heart; epithelium of bronchus; bronchial epithelial cell; vastus lateralis muscle; glutes; mucosa of paranasal sinus; thoracic diaphragm; skeletal muscle tissue / Top expressed in: gastrocnemius muscle; vastus lateralis muscle; medial head of gastrocnemius muscle; endocardial cushion; triceps brachii muscle; tibialis anterior muscle; facial motor nucleus; atrioventricular valve; muscle of thigh; anterior horn of spinal cord; More reference expression data
BioGPS	n/a
Gene ontology
Molecular function	methyltransferase activity; transferase activity; RNA polymerase II complex binding; p53 binding; metal ion binding; protein-lysine N-methyltransferase activity; protein binding; histone methyltransferase activity (H3-K36 specific); lysine N-methyltransferase activity; histone-lysine N-methyltransferase activity
Cellular component	cytosol; nucleoplasm; nucleus; cytoplasm
Biological process	regulation of DNA damage response, signal transduction by p53 class mediator; regulation of transcription, DNA-templated; negative regulation of transcription by RNA polymerase II; peptidyl-lysine monomethylation; transcription, DNA-templated; histone H3-K36 methylation; development of the heart; methylation; peptidyl-lysine dimethylation; histone methylation; negative regulation of cell population proliferation; histone lysine methylation; regulation of signal transduction by p53 class mediator; chromatin organization
Sources:Amigo / QuickGO
Orthologs
Databases	NCBI: entry; OMA: entry
Species	Human	Mouse
Entrez	56950	226830
Ensembl	ENSG00000143499	ENSMUSG00000026603
UniProt	Q9NRG4	Q8R5A0
RefSeq (mRNA)	NM_020197	NM_026796
RefSeq (protein)	NP_064582	NP_081072
Location (UCSC)	Chr 1: 214.28 – 214.34 Mb	Chr 1: 189.61 – 189.65 Mb
PubMed search
- Wikidata
View/Edit Human	View/Edit Mouse

SET and MYND domain containing 2 is a protein that in humans is encoded by the SMYD2 gene.

== Function ==
SMYD2 belongs to the SET and MYND domain-containing (SMYD) family of protein lysine methyltransferases, which methylate lysine residues in both histone and non-histone substrates.

This enzyme methylates histone H3 at lysine 4 and lysine 36. In addition, it methylates a broad range of non-histone proteins, including the tumor suppressors p53 and Rb, the molecular chaperone Hsp90, estrogen receptor α, and PARP1. This methylation affects the stability and function of target proteins and hence is able to regulate a significant number of cellular processes including apoptosis and cell cycle progression.

== Clinical significance ==
Because SMYD2 methylation of p53 and Rb interferes with their tumor suppressor function, over expression of SMYD2 has been associated with worse outcomes in numerous types of cancer, including esophageal squamous cell carcinoma, breast, gastric, hepatocellular, and pancreatic ductal adenocarcinoma. These cancer associations have led to the development of small-molecule inhibitors of SMYD2 that suppress the proliferation of cancer cell lines.
