= SETD2 =

Protein-coding gene in the species Homo sapiens

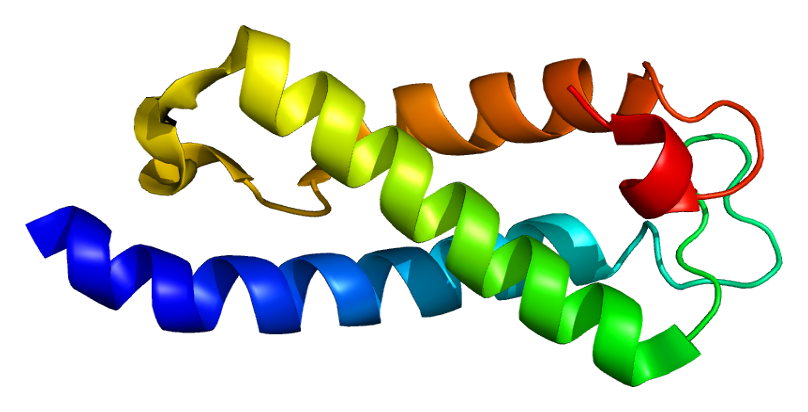

Identifiers
- Aliases: SETD2, HBP231, HIF-1, HIP-1, HYPB, KMT3A, SET2, p231HBP, HSPC069, LLS, SET domain containing 2
- External IDs: OMIM: 612778; MGI: 1918177; GeneCards: SETD2
Available structures
PDB	Ortholog search: PDBe RCSB
PDB	List of PDB id codes 2A7O, 2MDC, 2MDI, 2MDJ, 4FMU, 4H12
Enzyme activity
EC #	BRENDA	ExPASy	KEGG	MetaCyc
2.1.1.359	↗	↗	↗	↗

Gene location (Human)
Chr.	Chromosome 3 (human)
Band	3p21.31	Start	47,016,429 bp
Band	3p21.31	End	47,163,967 bp

Gene location (Mouse)
Chr.	Chromosome 9 (mouse)
Band	9|9 F2	Start	110,532,597 bp
Band	9|9 F2	End	110,618,633 bp
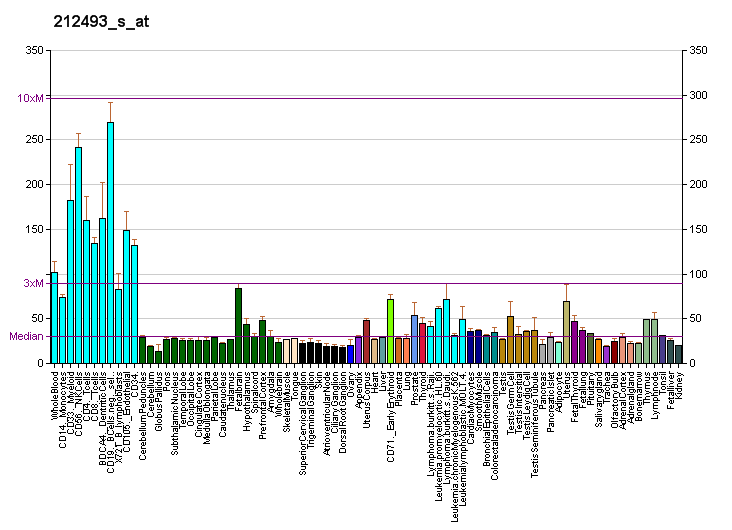

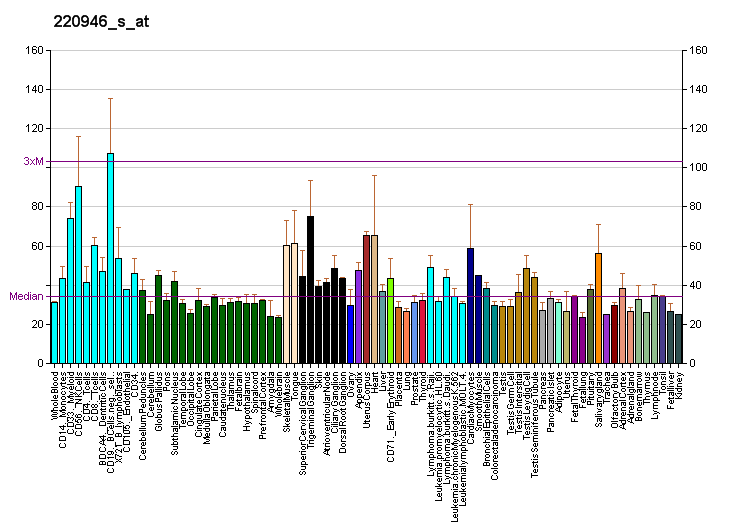

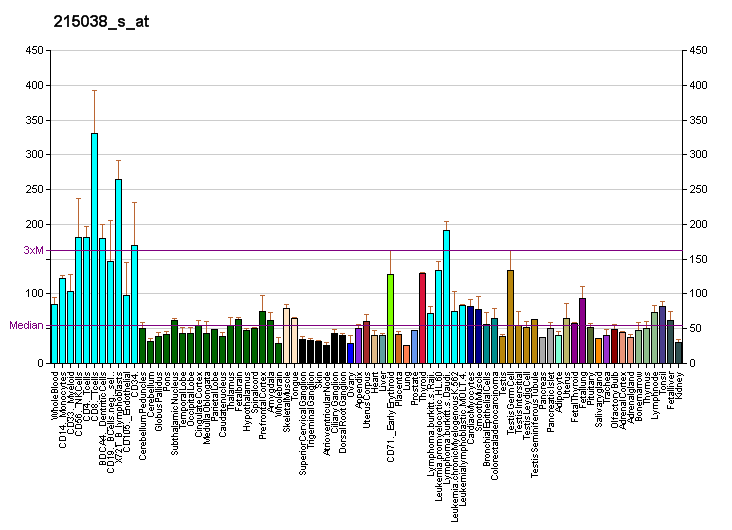
RNA expression pattern
Bgee	Human / Mouse (ortholog); Top expressed in: tendon of biceps brachii; endothelial cell; epithelium of colon; Achilles tendon; ventricular zone; sural nerve; pancreatic ductal cell; ganglionic eminence; internal globus pallidus; tonsil / Top expressed in: hand; genital tubercle; tail of embryo; ventricular zone; morula; neural layer of retina; granulocyte; mesenteric lymph nodes; thymus; epiblast; More reference expression data
BioGPS	More reference expression data
Gene ontology
Molecular function	methyltransferase activity; transferase activity; protein binding; histone-lysine N-methyltransferase activity; protein-lysine N-methyltransferase activity; alpha-tubulin binding; histone methyltransferase activity (H3-K36 specific); metal ion binding
Cellular component	nucleoplasm; nucleus; chromosome
Biological process	regulation of transcription, DNA-templated; histone H3-K36 dimethylation; regulation of mRNA export from nucleus; embryonic organ development; stem cell development; embryonic placenta morphogenesis; transcription elongation from RNA polymerase II promoter; coronary vasculature morphogenesis; cell migration involved in vasculogenesis; morphogenesis of a branching structure; transcription, DNA-templated; mesoderm morphogenesis; vasculogenesis; histone H3-K36 methylation; methylation; neural tube closure; nucleosome organization; angiogenesis; pericardium development; regulation of gene expression; histone H3-K36 trimethylation; embryonic cranial skeleton morphogenesis; DNA mismatch repair; histone lysine methylation; forebrain development; regulation of double-strand break repair via homologous recombination; peptidyl-lysine trimethylation; peptidyl-lysine monomethylation; regulation of cytokinesis; positive regulation of interferon-alpha production; response to type I interferon; endodermal cell differentiation; stem cell differentiation; microtubule cytoskeleton organization involved in mitosis; regulation of protein localization to chromatin; immune system process; DNA repair; cellular response to DNA damage stimulus; multicellular organism development; cell differentiation; innate immune response; defense response to virus; chromatin organization
Sources:Amigo / QuickGO
Orthologs
Databases	NCBI: entry; OMA: entry
Species	Human	Mouse
Entrez	29072	235626
Ensembl	ENSG00000181555	ENSMUSG00000044791
UniProt	Q9BYW2	E9Q5F9
RefSeq (mRNA)	NM_012271; NM_014159; NM_001349370	NM_001081340
RefSeq (protein)	NP_054878; NP_001336299	NP_001074809
Location (UCSC)	Chr 3: 47.02 – 47.16 Mb	Chr 9: 110.53 – 110.62 Mb
PubMed search
- Wikidata
View/Edit Human	View/Edit Mouse

SET domain containing 2 is an enzyme that in humans is encoded by the SETD2 gene.

== Function ==
SETD2 protein is a histone methyltransferase that is specific for lysine-36 of histone H3, and methylation of this residue is associated with active chromatin. This protein also contains a novel transcriptional activation domain and has been found associated with hyperphosphorylated RNA polymerase II.

The trimethylation of lysine-36 of histone H3 (H3K36me3) is required in human cells for homologous recombinational repair and genome stability. Depletion of SETD2 increases the frequency of deletion mutations that arise by the alternative DNA repair process of microhomology-mediated end joining.

== Clinical significance ==
The SETD2 gene is located on the short arm of chromosome 3 and has been shown to play a tumour suppressor role in human cancer.

== Interactions ==
SETD2 has been shown to interact with Huntingtin. Huntington's disease (HD), a neurodegenerative disorder characterized by loss of striatal neurons, is caused by an expansion of a polyglutamine tract in the HD protein huntingtin. SETD2 belongs to a class of huntingtin interacting proteins characterized by WW motifs.
