= SETD1B =

Protein-coding gene in the species Homo sapiens

Identifiers
- Aliases: SETD1B, KMT2G, Set1B, SET domain containing 1B, SET domain containing 1B, histone lysine methyltransferase, IDDSELD
- External IDs: OMIM: 611055; MGI: 2652820; GeneCards: SETD1B
Available structures
| PDB | Ortholog search: PDBe RCSB |
| PDB | List of PDB id codes 3UVO, 4ES0 |
Enzyme activity
| EC # | BRENDA | ExPASy | KEGG | MetaCyc |
|---|---|---|---|---|
| 2.1.1.364 | ↗ | ↗ | ↗ | ↗ |

Gene location (Human)
| Chr. | Chromosome 12 (human) |
| Band | 12q24.31 | Start | 121,804,009 bp |
| Band | 12q24.31 | End | 121,832,656 bp |

Gene location (Mouse)
| Chr. | Chromosome 5 (mouse) |
| Band | 5|5 F | Start | 123,280,256 bp |
| Band | 5|5 F | End | 123,306,692 bp |
RNA expression pattern
| Bgee | Human / Mouse (ortholog); Top expressed in: hair follicle; parietal pleura; cardia; visceral pleura; urethra; nipple; saphenous vein; germinal epithelium; seminal vesicula; pylorus / Top expressed in: hand; otolith organ; utricle; mesenteric lymph nodes; ascending aorta; cervix; blood; granulocyte; Gonadal ridge; aortic valve; More reference expression data |
| BioGPS | n/a |
Gene ontology
| Molecular function | nucleic acid binding; methyltransferase activity; transferase activity; protein binding; histone methyltransferase activity (H3-K4 specific); RNA binding; histone-lysine N-methyltransferase activity |
| Cellular component | histone methyltransferase complex; nuclear speck; nucleus; chromosome; nucleoplasm; cytosol; Set1C/COMPASS complex |
| Biological process | methylation; regulation of transcription, DNA-templated; transcription, DNA-templated; histone H3-K4 methylation; chromatin organization |
Sources:Amigo / QuickGO
Orthologs
| Databases | NCBI: entry; OMA: entry |
| Species | Human | Mouse |
| Entrez | 23067 | 208043 |
| Ensembl | ENSG00000139718 | ENSMUSG00000038384 |
| UniProt | Q9UPS6 | Q8CFT2 |
| RefSeq (mRNA) | NM_015048; NM_001353345 | NM_001040398; NM_177581 |
| RefSeq (protein) | NP_001340274 | NP_001035488 |
| Location (UCSC) | Chr 12: 121.8 – 121.83 Mb | Chr 5: 123.28 – 123.31 Mb |
| PubMed search |
- Wikidata
| View/Edit Human | View/Edit Mouse |

SET domain containing 1B is a protein that in humans is encoded by the SETD1B gene.

== Function ==
SET1B is a component of a histone methyltransferase complex that produces trimethylated histone H3 at Lys4 (Lee et al., 2007 [PubMed 17355966]).[supplied by OMIM, Mar 2008].
