= SETDB1 =

Enzyme-coding gene in humans

Identifiers
- Aliases: SETDB1, ESET, H3-K9-HMTase4, KG1T, KMT1E, TDRD21, SET domain bifurcated 1, SET domain bifurcated histone lysine methyltransferase 1
- External IDs: OMIM: 604396; MGI: 1934229; GeneCards: SETDB1
Available structures
PDB	Ortholog search: PDBe RCSB
PDB	List of PDB id codes 3DLM, 4X3S, 5KE2
Enzyme activity
EC #	BRENDA	ExPASy	KEGG	MetaCyc
2.1.1.366	↗	↗	↗	↗

Gene location (Human)
Chr.	Chromosome 1 (human)
Band	1q21.3	Start	150,926,263 bp
Band	1q21.3	End	150,964,744 bp

Gene location (Mouse)
Chr.	Chromosome 3 (mouse)
Band	3|3 F2.1	Start	95,230,836 bp
Band	3|3 F2.1	End	95,264,513 bp
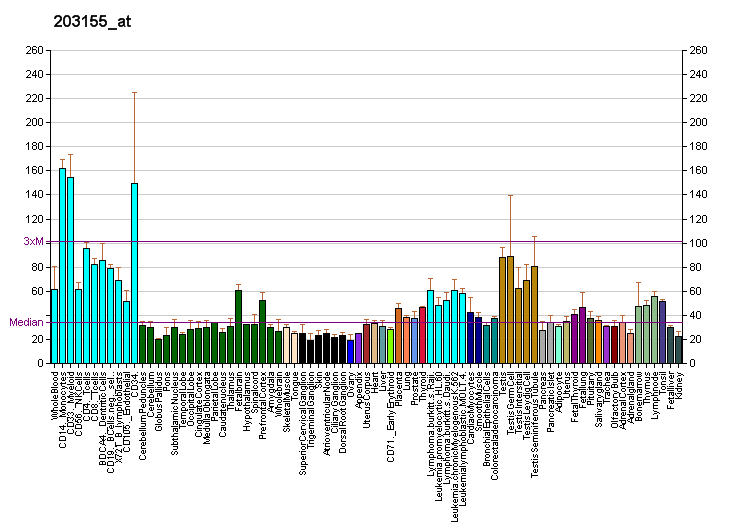

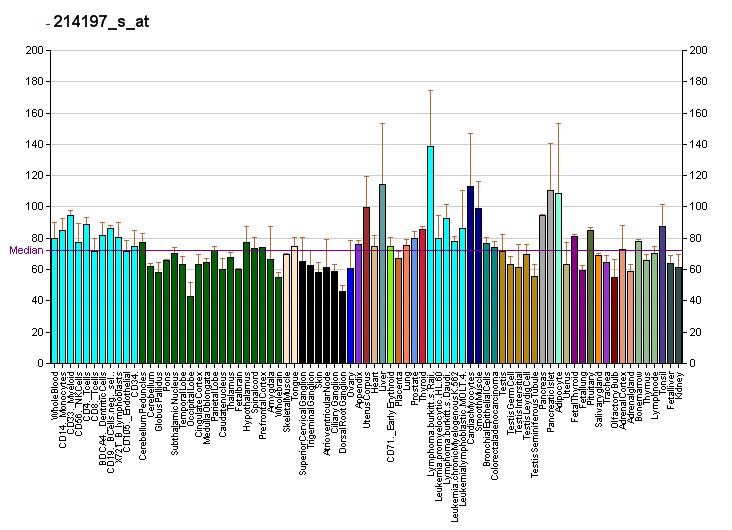
RNA expression pattern
Bgee	Human / Mouse (ortholog); Top expressed in: sural nerve; monocyte; granulocyte; right lobe of thyroid gland; right ovary; left ovary; left testis; right testis; right uterine tube; left lobe of thyroid gland / Top expressed in: secondary oocyte; zygote; primary oocyte; Ileal epithelium; tail of embryo; otic placode; genital tubercle; superior surface of tongue; gallbladder; ventricular zone; More reference expression data
BioGPS	More reference expression data
Gene ontology
Molecular function	methyltransferase activity; transferase activity; DNA binding; promoter-specific chromatin binding; zinc ion binding; histone-lysine N-methyltransferase activity; metal ion binding; protein binding; chromatin binding; histone methyltransferase activity (H3-K9 specific)
Cellular component	intracellular membrane-bounded organelle; plasma membrane; nucleoplasm; chromosome; nucleus; cytosol; cytoplasm
Biological process	regulation of transcription, DNA-templated; positive regulation of DNA methylation-dependent heterochromatin assembly; response to vitamin; transcription, DNA-templated; methylation; histone lysine methylation; Ras protein signal transduction; response to ethanol; chromatin organization; negative regulation of single stranded viral RNA replication via double stranded DNA intermediate; histone H3-K9 methylation
Sources:Amigo / QuickGO
Orthologs
Databases	NCBI: entry; OMA: entry
Species	Human	Mouse
Entrez	9869	84505
Ensembl	ENSG00000143379	ENSMUSG00000015697
UniProt	Q15047	O88974
RefSeq (mRNA)	NM_001145415; NM_001243491; NM_012432; NM_001366417; NM_001366418	NM_001163641; NM_001163642; NM_018877
RefSeq (protein)	NP_001138887; NP_001230420; NP_036564; NP_001353346; NP_001353347	n/a
Location (UCSC)	Chr 1: 150.93 – 150.96 Mb	Chr 3: 95.23 – 95.26 Mb
PubMed search
- Wikidata
View/Edit Human	View/Edit Mouse

Histone-lysine N-methyltransferase SETDB1 is an enzyme that in humans is encoded by the SETDB1 gene. SETDB1 is also known as KMT1E or H3K9 methyltransferase ESET.

== Function ==
The human SETDB1 protein consists of multiple N-terminal and C-terminal functional domains linked by an intervening sequence of variable length, which can exist in multiple isoforms generated by alternative splicing.

The chief functional domain is the SET domain, a highly conserved, approximately 150-amino acid motif positioned near SETDB1's C-terminus and implicated in the modulation of chromatin structure. It was originally identified as part of a larger conserved region present in the Drosophila Trithorax protein and was subsequently identified in the Drosophila Su(var)3–9 and Enhancer of zeste proteins, from which the acronym SET is derived. Studies have suggested that the SET domain may be a signature of proteins that modulate transcriptionally active or repressed chromatin states through chromatin remodeling activities. In SETDB1, the SET domain is bifurcated into two non-contiguous subdomains.

The SET domain functions as an H3K9-specific methyltransferase which exclusively methylates histone H3 lysine 9 (H3K9) by catalyzing the covalent attachment of a methyl group (—CH_{3}) to this particular lysine's electrophilic side chain. It is capable of adding to unmethylated H3K9 to convert it to the monomethylated state (H3K9me1), but its primary substrates are the mono- and dimethylated forms, which it converts to dimethylated (H3K9me2) and trimethylated (H3K9me3) states, respectively. H3K9 methylation is a classic epigenetic mark that recruits heterochromatin protein 1 (HP1) to the marked nucleosome, which then induces the condensation of the nucleosome into repressive heterochromatin, making nearby DNA sequences less accessible to transcriptional machinery and hence downregulating the expression of nearby genes. Thus SETDB1 is a core functional enzyme in repressive pathways that control gene expression by the post-translational modification of H3K9. A specific residue within the SET domain, lysine 867 (K867), is monoubiquitinated by the protein ATF7IP. This modification helps retain SETDB1 in the nucleus, prevents its degradation by proteasomes, and is necessary for SETDB1 to have methyltransferase activity.

In the N-terminal region, the SETDB1 protein also contains a methyl CpG-binding domain (MBD) capable of recognizing CpG-rich genomic DNA and interacting with DNA methyltransferases. Two consecutive Tudor domains help target SETDB1 specifically to H3K9 by functioning as anchors to either side of the K9 residue in the N-terminal tail of histone H3.

== Interactions ==
In mammals, SETDB1 has been shown to interact with the mediator protein TRIM28 and various DNA-binding KRAB domain-containing transcription factors, forming a protein complex that is responsible for much of the repressive modification of H3K9 throughout the genome. TRIM28 effectively links SETDB1's methyltransferase activity to the KRAB domain's ability to bind DNA at specific sequences, allowing the selective modification of H3K9 at sequence-specific loci.

During meiosis, synapsis of homologous chromosomes ensures correct homologous chromosome segregation. Asynapsed homologs are transcriptionally inactivated by a process of meiotic silencing. Meiotic silencing depends on the DNA damage response network. SETDB1 has been identified as the bridge linking the DNA damage response to chromosome silencing in male mice.

== See also ==
- SETD1A, a protein that is highly homologous to SETDB1
