= SMYD4 =

Protein-coding gene in the species Homo sapiens

Identifiers
- Aliases: SMYD4, ZMYND21, SET and MYND domain containing 4
- External IDs: MGI: 2442796; GeneCards: SMYD4

Gene location (Human)
Chr.	Chromosome 17 (human)
Band	17p13.3	Start	1,779,485 bp
Band	17p13.3	End	1,830,634 bp

Gene location (Mouse)
Chr.	Chromosome 11 (mouse)
Band	11|11 B5	Start	75,239,259 bp
Band	11|11 B5	End	75,296,531 bp
RNA expression pattern
Bgee	Human / Mouse (ortholog); Top expressed in: gastrocnemius muscle; muscle of thigh; deltoid muscle; endothelial cell; gonad; popliteal artery; tibial arteries; Achilles tendon; gastric mucosa; left ovary / Top expressed in: extraocular muscle; substantia nigra; vestibular membrane of cochlear duct; Epithelium of choroid plexus; lumbar spinal ganglion; right kidney; endothelial cell of lymphatic vessel; medullary collecting duct; neural tube; ventricular zone; More reference expression data
BioGPS	n/a
Orthologs
Databases	NCBI: entry; OMA: entry
Species	Human	Mouse
Entrez	114826	319822
Ensembl	ENSG00000186532	ENSMUSG00000018809
UniProt	Q8IYR2	Q8BTK5
RefSeq (mRNA)	NM_052928	NM_001102611; NM_177009
RefSeq (protein)	NP_443160	NP_001096081
Location (UCSC)	Chr 17: 1.78 – 1.83 Mb	Chr 11: 75.24 – 75.3 Mb
PubMed search
- Wikidata
View/Edit Human	View/Edit Mouse

SET and MYND domain-containing protein 4 is a protein that in humans is encoded by the SMYD4 gene.
