= SETD7 =

Protein-coding gene in the species Homo sapiens

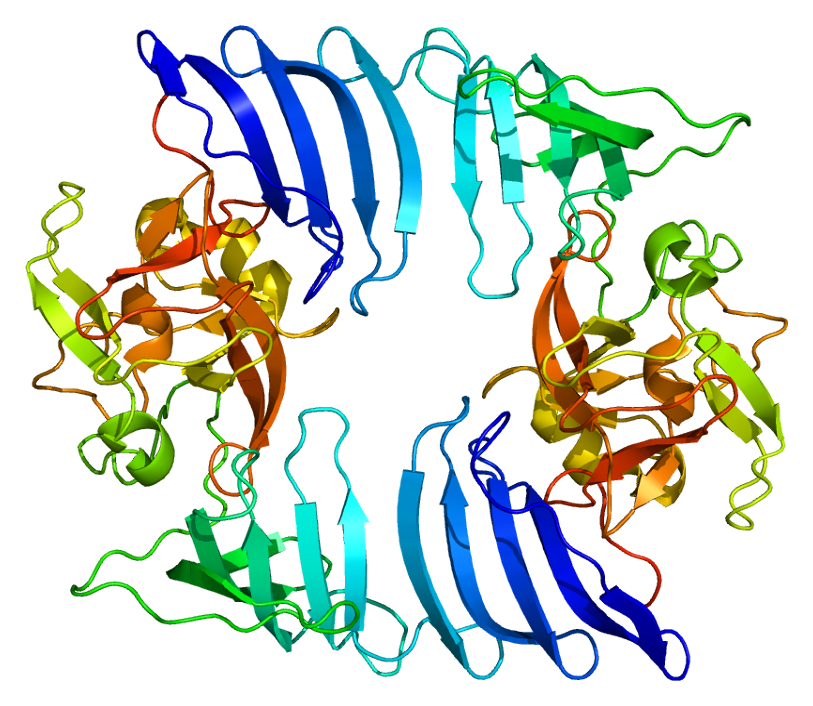

Identifiers
- Aliases: SETD7, KMT7, SET7, SET7/9, SET9, SET domain containing lysine methyltransferase 7, SET domain containing 7, histone lysine methyltransferase
- External IDs: OMIM: 606594; MGI: 1920501; GeneCards: SETD7
Available structures
PDB	Ortholog search: PDBe RCSB
PDB	List of PDB id codes 1H3I, 1MT6, 1MUF, 1N6A, 1N6C, 1O9S, 1XQH, 2F69, 3CBM, 3CBO, 3CBP, 3M53, 3M54, 3M55, 3M56, 3M57, 3M58, 3M59, 3M5A, 3OS5, 3VUZ, 3VV0, 4E47, 4J7F, 4J8O, 4JDS, 4JLG, 5EG2, 5AYF
Enzyme activity
EC #	BRENDA	ExPASy	KEGG	MetaCyc
2.1.1.364	↗	↗	↗	↗

Gene location (Human)
Chr.	Chromosome 4 (human)
Band	4q31.1	Start	139,495,941 bp
Band	4q31.1	End	139,606,699 bp

Gene location (Mouse)
Chr.	Chromosome 3 (mouse)
Band	3|3 C	Start	51,422,740 bp
Band	3|3 C	End	51,468,300 bp
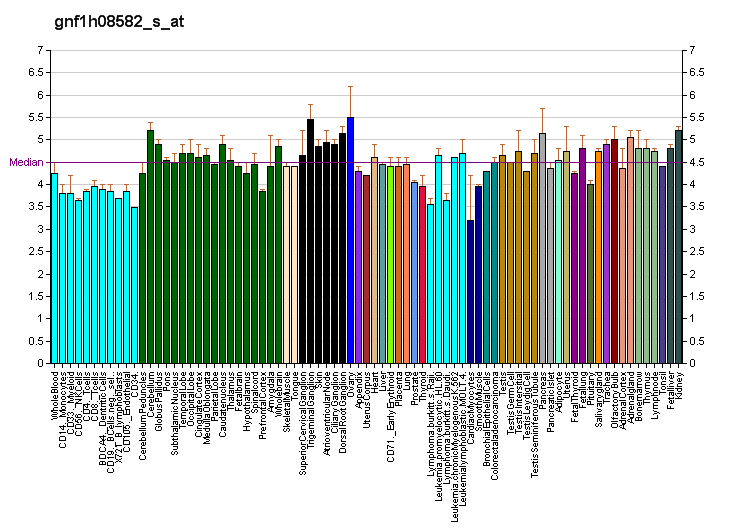

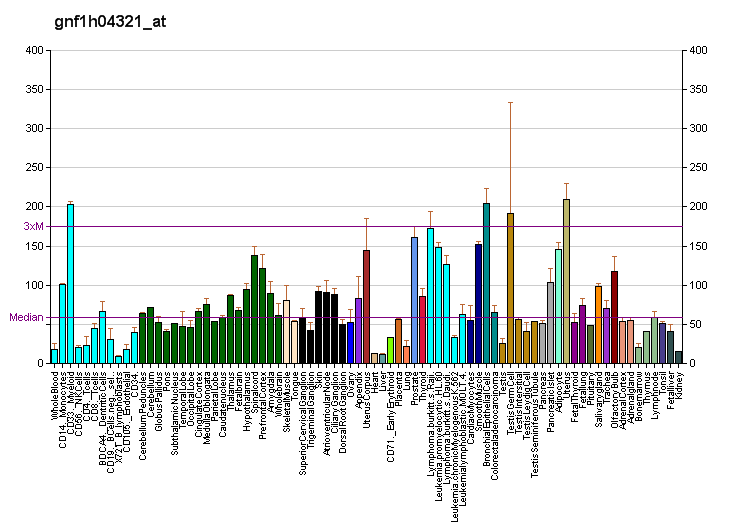
RNA expression pattern
Bgee	Human / Mouse (ortholog); Top expressed in: tibialis anterior muscle; deltoid muscle; cardiac muscle tissue of right atrium; myocardium of left ventricle; skin of arm; quadriceps femoris muscle; Skeletal muscle tissue of rectus abdominis; biceps brachii; vastus lateralis muscle; Skeletal muscle tissue of biceps brachii / Top expressed in: triceps brachii muscle; temporal muscle; sternocleidomastoid muscle; ciliary body; digastric muscle; lobe of cerebellum; cerebellar vermis; ankle; lateral geniculate nucleus; epithelium of lens; More reference expression data
BioGPS	More reference expression data
Gene ontology
Molecular function	methyltransferase activity; transferase activity; p53 binding; chromatin binding; protein-lysine N-methyltransferase activity; protein binding; histone-lysine N-methyltransferase activity
Cellular component	nucleoplasm; chromosome; nucleolus; nucleus
Biological process	regulation of transcription, DNA-templated; peptidyl-lysine monomethylation; transcription, DNA-templated; cellular response to DNA damage stimulus; positive regulation of transcription, DNA-templated; peptidyl-lysine methylation; methylation; heterochromatin organization; peptidyl-lysine dimethylation; histone lysine methylation; response to ethanol; regulation of histone H3-K9 methylation; chromatin organization
Sources:Amigo / QuickGO
Orthologs
Databases	NCBI: entry; OMA: entry
Species	Human	Mouse
Entrez	80854	73251
Ensembl	ENSG00000145391	ENSMUSG00000037111
UniProt	Q8WTS6	Q8VHL1
RefSeq (mRNA)	NM_001306199; NM_001306200; NM_030648	NM_080793
RefSeq (protein)	NP_001293128; NP_001293129; NP_085151	NP_542983
Location (UCSC)	Chr 4: 139.5 – 139.61 Mb	Chr 3: 51.42 – 51.47 Mb
PubMed search
- Wikidata
View/Edit Human	View/Edit Mouse

Histone-lysine N-methyltransferase SETD7 is an enzyme that in humans is encoded by the SETD7 gene.
