= (Ribulose-bisphosphate carboxylase)-lysine N-methyltransferase =

Class of enzymes

[ribulose-bisphosphate carboxylase]-lysine N-methyltransferase

Identifiers
- EC no.: 2.1.1.127
- CAS no.: 139171-98-5

Databases
- IntEnz: IntEnz view
- BRENDA: BRENDA entry
- ExPASy: NiceZyme view
- KEGG: KEGG entry
- MetaCyc: metabolic pathway
- PRIAM: profile
- PDB structures: RCSB PDB PDBe PDBsum
- Gene Ontology: AmiGO / QuickGO
Search
- PMC: articles
- PubMed: articles
- NCBI: proteins

In enzymology, a [ribulose-bisphosphate carboxylase]-lysine N-methyltransferase (EC 2.1.1.127) is an enzyme that catalyzes the chemical reaction

S-adenosyl-L-methionine + [ribulose-1,5-bisphosphate carboxylase]-lysine $\rightleftharpoons$ S-adenosyl-L-homocysteine + [ribulose-1,5-bisphosphate carboxylase]-N_{6}-methyl-L-lysine

Thus, the two substrates of this enzyme are S-adenosyl methionine and ribulose-1,5-bisphosphate carboxylase-lysine, whereas its two products are S-adenosylhomocysteine and ribulose-1,5-bisphosphate carboxylase-N6-methyl-L-lysine.

== Transferase Family ==
This enzyme belongs to the family of transferases, specifically those transferring one-carbon group methyltransferases.

The systematic name of this enzyme class is S-adenosyl-L-methionine:[3-phospho-D-glycerate-carboxy-lyase (dimerizing)]-lysine N6-methyltransferase.

Other names in common use include rubisco methyltransferase, ribulose-bisphosphate-carboxylase/oxygenase N-methyltransferase, ribulose-1,5-bisphosphate carboxylase/oxygenase large subunit, epsilonN-methyltransferase, S-adenosyl-L-methionine:[3-phospho-D-glycerate-carboxy-lyase, and (dimerizing)]-lysine 6-N-methyltransferase.

== Structural studies ==
As of late 2007, 7 structures have been solved for this class of enzymes, with PDB accession codes 1MLV, 1OZV, 1P0Y, 2H21, 2H23, 2H2E, and 2H2J.
