= SUV39H2 =

Protein-coding gene in the species Homo sapiens

Identifiers
- Aliases: SUV39H2, KMT1B, suppressor of variegation 3-9 homolog 2, SUV39H2 histone lysine methyltransferase
- External IDs: OMIM: 606503; MGI: 1890396; GeneCards: SUV39H2
Available structures
PDB	Ortholog search: PDBe RCSB
PDB	List of PDB id codes 2R3A

Gene location (Human)
Chr.	Chromosome 10 (human)
Band	10p13	Start	14,878,820 bp
Band	10p13	End	14,904,315 bp

Gene location (Mouse)
Chr.	Chromosome 2 (mouse)
Band	2 A1|2 1.95 cM	Start	3,456,852 bp
Band	2 A1|2 1.95 cM	End	3,476,068 bp
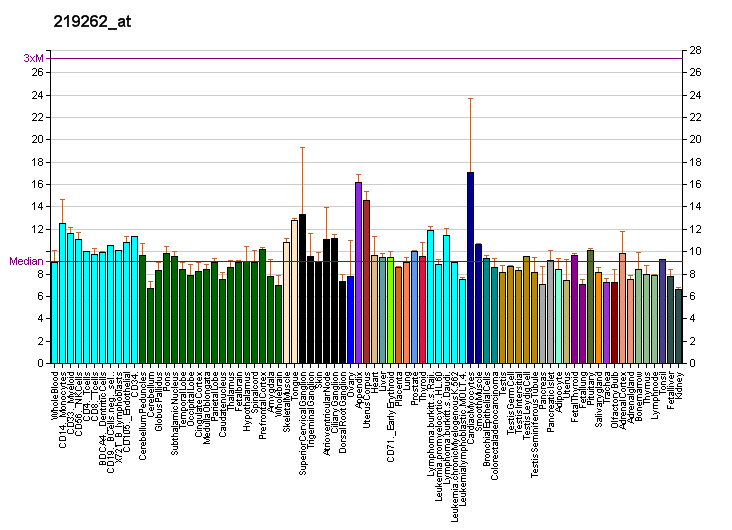
RNA expression pattern
Bgee	Human / Mouse (ortholog); Top expressed in: sperm; secondary oocyte; left testis; right testis; ventricular zone; ganglionic eminence; gonad; testicle; stromal cell of endometrium; islet of Langerhans / Top expressed in: tail of embryo; secondary oocyte; genital tubercle; zygote; spermatid; primary oocyte; ventricular zone; epiblast; primitive streak; embryo; More reference expression data
BioGPS	More reference expression data
Gene ontology
Molecular function	methyltransferase activity; transferase activity; histone methyltransferase activity (H3-K9 specific); transcription cis-regulatory region binding; metal ion binding; protein binding; histone-lysine N-methyltransferase activity; zinc ion binding; S-adenosyl-L-methionine binding
Cellular component	chromosome; nucleoplasm; chromatin; chromosome, centromeric region; nucleus
Biological process	chromatin remodeling; cell differentiation; regulation of transcription, DNA-templated; rhythmic process; histone H3-K9 dimethylation; negative regulation of circadian rhythm; negative regulation of transcription by RNA polymerase II; transcription, DNA-templated; histone H3-K9 trimethylation; methylation; histone lysine methylation; cell cycle; negative regulation of transcription, DNA-templated; cellular response to hypoxia; chromatin organization
Sources:Amigo / QuickGO
Orthologs
Databases	NCBI: entry; OMA: entry
Species	Human	Mouse
Entrez	79723	64707
Ensembl	ENSG00000152455	ENSMUSG00000026646
UniProt	Q9H5I1	Q9EQQ0
RefSeq (mRNA)	NM_001193424; NM_001193425; NM_001193426; NM_001193427; NM_024670	NM_022724
RefSeq (protein)	NP_001180353; NP_001180354; NP_001180355; NP_001180356; NP_078946	NP_073561
Location (UCSC)	Chr 10: 14.88 – 14.9 Mb	Chr 2: 3.46 – 3.48 Mb
PubMed search
- Wikidata
View/Edit Human	View/Edit Mouse

Histone-lysine N-methyltransferase SUV39H2 is an enzyme that in humans is encoded by the SUV39H2 gene.
