= PRDM2 =

Protein-coding gene in humans

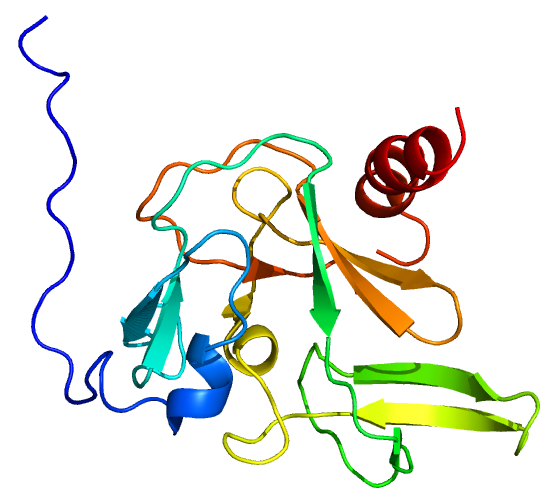

Identifiers
- Aliases: PRDM2, HUMHOXY1, KMT8, MTB-ZF, RIZ, RIZ1, RIZ2, PR domain 2, PR/SET domain 2, KMT8A
- External IDs: OMIM: 601196; MGI: 107628; GeneCards: PRDM2
Available structures
PDB	Human UniProt search: PDBe RCSB
PDB	List of PDB id codes 2JV0, 2QPW
Enzyme activity
EC #	BRENDA	ExPASy	KEGG	MetaCyc
2.1.1.355	↗	↗	↗	↗

Gene location (Human)
Chr.	Chromosome 1 (human)
Band	1p36.21	Start	13,700,188 bp
Band	1p36.21	End	13,825,079 bp

Gene location (Mouse)
Chr.	Chromosome 4 (mouse)
Band	4 E1|4 76.84 cM	Start	143,107,391 bp
Band	4 E1|4 76.84 cM	End	143,212,995 bp
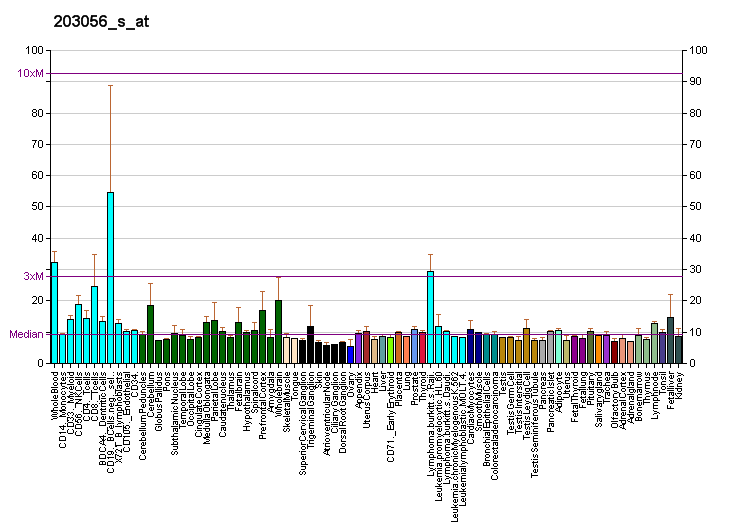

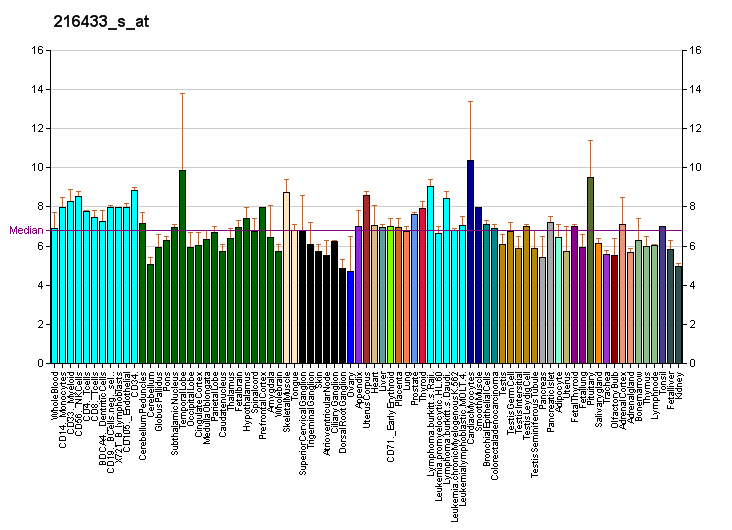

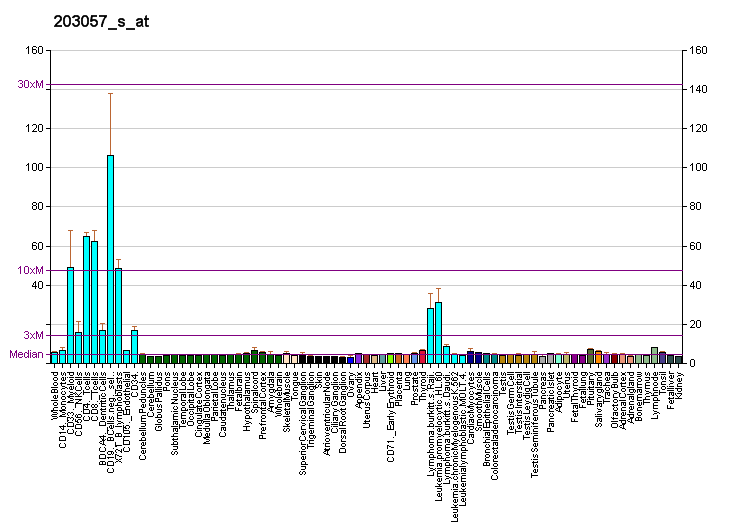
RNA expression pattern
Bgee	Human / Mouse (ortholog); Top expressed in: sural nerve; secondary oocyte; buccal mucosa cell; middle temporal gyrus; epithelium of colon; Brodmann area 46; Brodmann area 10; frontal pole; bone marrow cell; Brodmann area 23 / Top expressed in: interventricular septum; spermatocyte; spermatid; granulocyte; zygote; tail of embryo; genital tubercle; otic vesicle; muscle of thigh; visual cortex; More reference expression data
BioGPS	More reference expression data
Gene ontology
Molecular function	DNA-binding transcription factor activity; methyltransferase activity; transferase activity; DNA binding; zinc ion binding; histone-lysine N-methyltransferase activity; metal ion binding; nucleic acid binding; RNA polymerase II transcription regulatory region sequence-specific DNA binding; DNA-binding transcription activator activity, RNA polymerase II-specific; DNA-binding transcription factor activity, RNA polymerase II-specific; chromatin DNA binding; sequence-specific DNA binding
Cellular component	nucleus; Golgi apparatus
Biological process	histone lysine methylation; methylation; regulation of transcription, DNA-templated; determination of adult lifespan; transcription, DNA-templated; transcription by RNA polymerase II; positive regulation of transcription by RNA polymerase II
Sources:Amigo / QuickGO
Orthologs
Databases	NCBI: entry; OMA: entry
Species	Human	Mouse
Entrez	7799	110593
Ensembl	ENSG00000116731	ENSMUSG00000057637
UniProt	Q13029	n/a
RefSeq (mRNA)	NM_001007257; NM_001135610; NM_012231; NM_015866; NM_001393986 NM_001393987; NM_001393988	NM_001081355; NM_001256380
RefSeq (protein)	NP_001007258; NP_001129082; NP_036363; NP_056950	n/a
Location (UCSC)	Chr 1: 13.7 – 13.83 Mb	Chr 4: 143.11 – 143.21 Mb
PubMed search
- Wikidata
View/Edit Human	View/Edit Mouse

PR domain zinc finger protein 2 is a protein that in humans is encoded by the PRDM2 gene.

== Function ==
This tumor suppressor gene is a member of a nuclear histone/protein methyltransferase superfamily. It encodes a zinc finger protein that can bind to retinoblastoma protein, estrogen receptor, and the TPA-responsive element (MTE) of the heme-oxygenase-1 gene. Although the functions of this protein have not been fully characterized, it may (1) play a role in transcriptional regulation during neuronal differentiation and pathogenesis of retinoblastoma, (2) act as a transcriptional activator of the heme-oxygenase-1 gene, and (3) be a specific effector of estrogen action. Three transcript variants encoding different isoforms have been found for this gene.

== Interactions ==
PRDM2 has been shown to interact with Estrogen receptor alpha and Retinoblastoma protein.
