= (Fructose-bisphosphate aldolase)-lysine N-methyltransferase =

Class of enzymes

Identifiers
- EC no.: 2.1.1.259

Databases
- IntEnz: IntEnz view
- BRENDA: BRENDA entry
- ExPASy: NiceZyme view
- KEGG: KEGG entry
- MetaCyc: metabolic pathway
- PRIAM: profile
- PDB structures: RCSB PDB PDBe PDBsum
Search
- PMC: articles
- PubMed: articles
- NCBI: proteins

[Fructose-bisphosphate aldolase]-lysine N-methyltransferase (EC 2.1.1.259) is an enzyme that catalyses the following chemical reaction:

3 S-adenosyl-L-methionine + [fructose-bisphosphate aldolase]-L-lysine $\rightleftharpoons$ 3 S-adenosyl-L-homocysteine + [fructose-bisphosphate aldolase]-N^{6},N^{6},N^{6}-trimethyl-L-lysine

The enzyme methylates a conserved lysine in the C-terminal part of higher plant fructose-bisphosphate aldolase (EC 4.1.2.13).

== Nomenclature ==
The systematic name of the enzyme is:

- S-adenosyl-L-methionine:(fructose-bisphosphate aldolase)-lysine N^{6}-methyltransferase

Other names are:

- rubisco methyltransferase
- ribulose-bisphosphate-carboxylase/oxygenase N-methyltransferase
- ribulose-1,5-bisphosphate carboxylase/oxygenase large subunit epsilonN-methyltransferase
- S-adenosyl-L-methionine:[3-phospho-D-glycerate-carboxy-lyase (dimerizing)]-lysine 6-N-methyltransferase)

== See also ==
- Methyllysine
- RuBisCO
- SET domain
