= SETD6 =

Protein-coding gene in the species Homo sapiens

Identifiers
- Aliases: SETD6, SET domain containing 6, SET domain containing 6, protein lysine methyltransferase
- External IDs: OMIM: 616424; MGI: 1913333; GeneCards: SETD6
Available structures
PDB	Ortholog search: PDBe RCSB
PDB	List of PDB id codes 3QXY, 3RC0

Gene location (Human)
Chr.	Chromosome 16 (human)
Band	16q21	Start	58,515,479 bp
Band	16q21	End	58,523,842 bp

Gene location (Mouse)
Chr.	Chromosome 8 (mouse)
Band	8|8 D1	Start	95,715,881 bp
Band	8|8 D1	End	95,719,010 bp
RNA expression pattern
Bgee	Human / Mouse (ortholog); Top expressed in: secondary oocyte; body of pancreas; right hemisphere of cerebellum; tendon of biceps brachii; right uterine tube; right lobe of thyroid gland; left lobe of thyroid gland; cerebellar vermis; pituitary gland; anterior pituitary / Top expressed in: otic placode; ascending aorta; saccule; aortic valve; otic vesicle; external carotid artery; internal carotid artery; proximal tubule; zygote; yolk sac; More reference expression data
BioGPS	n/a
Gene ontology
Molecular function	methyltransferase activity; transferase activity; protein binding; NF-kappaB binding; protein-lysine N-methyltransferase activity
Cellular component	nucleus; nucleoplasm; cytosol
Biological process	stem cell population maintenance; histone lysine methylation; methylation; negative regulation of NF-kappaB transcription factor activity; peptidyl-lysine monomethylation; stem cell differentiation; regulation of inflammatory response
Sources:Amigo / QuickGO
Orthologs
Databases	NCBI: entry; OMA: entry
Species	Human	Mouse
Entrez	79918	66083
Ensembl	ENSG00000103037	ENSMUSG00000031671
UniProt	Q8TBK2	Q9CWY3
RefSeq (mRNA)	NM_001160305; NM_024860	NM_001035123
RefSeq (protein)	NP_001153777; NP_079136	NP_001030295; NP_001355283
Location (UCSC)	Chr 16: 58.52 – 58.52 Mb	Chr 8: 95.72 – 95.72 Mb
PubMed search
- Wikidata
View/Edit Human	View/Edit Mouse

SET domain containing 6 is a protein in humans that is encoded by the SETD6 gene.

SETD6 monomethylates the RelA subunit of nuclear factor kappa B (NF-κB). RelA mono-methylation at lysine 310 (RelAK310me1) leads to the constitutive repression of RelA target genes by recruiting the PKMT G9a-like protein (GLP), which catalyzes H3K9me2 and leads to chromatin silencing and gene repression. In response to stimulation with TNFa and lipopolysaccharide, phosphorylation of RelA at serine 311 (RelAS311ph) by PKCzeta physically blocks the interaction between GLP and RelAK310me1, leading to transcription activation.

PAK4 Methylation by SETD6 Promotes the Activation of the Wnt/β-Catenin Pathway. SETD6 binds and methylates PAK4 both in vitro and in cells at chromatin. Depletion of SETD6 in various cell lines leads to a dramatic reduction in the expression of Wnt/β-catenin target genes.

SETD6 binds to but does not methylate DJ1. Under basal conditions, SETD6 and DJ1 associate with chromatin which inhibits DJ1 to activate Nrf2 transcription activity. In response to oxidative stress, SETD6 mRNA and protein levels are dramatically reduced.

SETD6 specifically binds and methylates PLK1 during mitosis at K209 and K413. Depletion of SETD6, as well as the double substitution of the lysine residues (K209/413R), leads to an elevation in PLK1 catalytic activity, leading to the acceleration of the different mitotic steps, ending with early cytokinesis.
