= Muskelin =

Protein-coding gene in humans

MKLN1

Identifiers
- Aliases: MKLN1, TWA2, muskelin 1
- External IDs: OMIM: 605623; MGI: 1351638; GeneCards: MKLN1
Available structures
PDB	Ortholog search: PDBe RCSB
PDB	List of PDB id codes 4PQQ

Gene location (Human)
Chr.	Chromosome 7 (human)
Band	7q32.3	Start	131,110,096 bp
Band	7q32.3	End	131,496,632 bp

Gene location (Mouse)
Chr.	Chromosome 6 (mouse)
Band	6|6 A3.3	Start	31,375,670 bp
Band	6|6 A3.3	End	31,493,746 bp
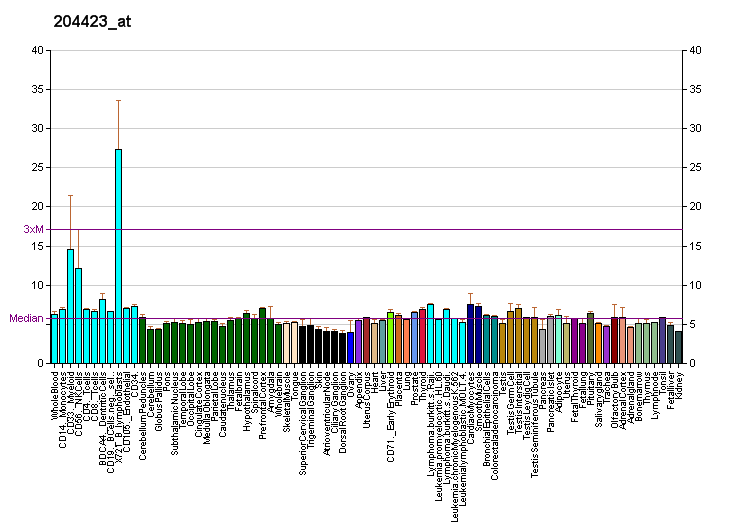
RNA expression pattern
Bgee	Human / Mouse (ortholog); Top expressed in: Achilles tendon; jejunal mucosa; buccal mucosa cell; nipple; lower lobe of lung; epithelium of colon; testicle; corpus callosum; secondary oocyte; tail of epididymis / Top expressed in: spermatocyte; yolk sac; right kidney; muscle of thigh; spermatid; ventricular zone; granulocyte; tail of embryo; neural layer of retina; genital tubercle; More reference expression data
BioGPS	More reference expression data
Gene ontology
Molecular function	identical protein binding; protein binding; protein homodimerization activity
Cellular component	cytoplasm; ruffle; cytosol; cell projection; cell cortex; ubiquitin ligase complex; nucleoplasm; nucleus; cell junction; synapse
Biological process	actin cytoskeleton reorganization; cell-matrix adhesion; signal transduction; regulation of cell shape; regulation of receptor internalization
Sources:Amigo / QuickGO
Orthologs
Databases	NCBI: entry; OMA: entry
Species	Human	Mouse
Entrez	4289	27418
Ensembl	ENSG00000128585	ENSMUSG00000025609
UniProt	Q9UL63	O89050
RefSeq (mRNA)	NM_001145354; NM_013255; NM_001321316	NM_013791
RefSeq (protein)	NP_001138826; NP_001308245; NP_037387	NP_038819
Location (UCSC)	Chr 7: 131.11 – 131.5 Mb	Chr 6: 31.38 – 31.49 Mb
PubMed search
- Wikidata
View/Edit Human	View/Edit Mouse

Muskelin is a protein that in humans is encoded by the MKLN1 gene.

== Gene ==
In humans, the MKLN1 gene is located on the long arm of chromosome 7 (7q32.3). It produces 12 splice variant transcripts, 6 of which are translated into a protein product. It is widely expressed across human tissues.

== Protein ==
At its N-terminus, muskelin has a disicoidin domain. This is followed by the alpha helical domains Lis1 Homology (LisH) and C-terminal to LisH (CTLH). After these lies the kelch repeat β-propellor domain, followed at the C-terminus by the CRA domain. Muskelin acts as a scaffold in the C-terminal to LisH (CTLH) E3 ligase complex. It is one of two proteins, along with WDR26, that can facilitate the formation of a massive supramolecular structure (600 kDa).

== CTLH complex ==
Muskelin is a component of the CTLH complex, which assembles into distinct supramolecular structures depending on whether WDR26 or muskelin acts as the β-propeller subunit. The CTLH complex is a recently characterized RING E3 ubiquitin ligase. As an E3 ligase, it catalyzes the final step of the ubiquitination cascade by mediating the interaction between a ubiquitin-conjugating enzyme (E2) and the substrate protein targeted for ubiquitination. The CTLH complex primarily functions within the ubiquitin-proteasome system, tagging proteins for degradation by the 26S proteasome.

The complex consists of several core components. Its structural scaffold is formed by RanBPM, GID8, and ARMC8. The RING heterodimer, composed of RMND5A and MAEA, is responsible for the complex’s E3 ligase activity by directly interacting with the E2 enzyme. GID4 functions as the primary substrate receptor, recognizing and recruiting proteins targeted for ubiquitination.

WDR26 and muskelin act in a mutually exclusive manner to promote the assembly of a higher-order CTLH structure, which includes four scaffold units, two RING heterodimers, and two GID4 receptors. WDR26 achieves this through binding as a pair of homodimers, while muskelin binds as a pair of homotetramers, each inserting between scaffold units to stabilize the supramolecular structure.

These WDR26- and muskelin-containing complexes are functionally distinct due to differences in their substrate-binding interfaces. This structural variation enables them to recruit different sets of substrates. In muskelin knockout cells, expression levels of 39 proteins are altered, 16 of which are also affected by WDR26 knockout, indicating 23 proteins are specifically regulated by the muskelin-containing CTLH complex.

The muskelin-containing complex also regulates its own activity via a negative feedback mechanism. It has been shown to ubiquitinate and promote the degradation of muskelin itself, a process not observed with WDR26 or other subunits. This autoregulation substitutes for alternative substrate receptors, helping maintain appropriate substrate levels.

Through its two distinct configurations, the CTLH complex participates in a wide range of cellular processes, including metabolism, cell proliferation and survival, the maternal to zygotic transition, cell migration and adhesion, immune responses, autophagy, and erythropoiesis. Accordingly, muskelin is broadly expressed across diverse tissues and cell types.

== Species distribution ==
The CTLH complex was first discovered in Saccharomyces cerevisiae (Brewer's yeast), however here it lacks a muskelin homologue. Similarly, it also lacks a muskelin homologue in plants and nematodes, however it does exist in higher order animals such as mammals, fish and amphibians.

== Clinical significance ==
The CTLH complex is mostly implicated in neurological conditions. The most well understood of these is Skraban–Deardorff syndrome, a neurodevelopmental disorder caused by a multitude of WDR26 mutations impairing its ability to form the supramolecular structure. A particular muskelin SNP has been linked with early-onset bipolar disorder via a genome-wide association study, however the biological mechanism for this is unclear.
