= Skraban–Deardorff syndrome =

Rare genetic disorder

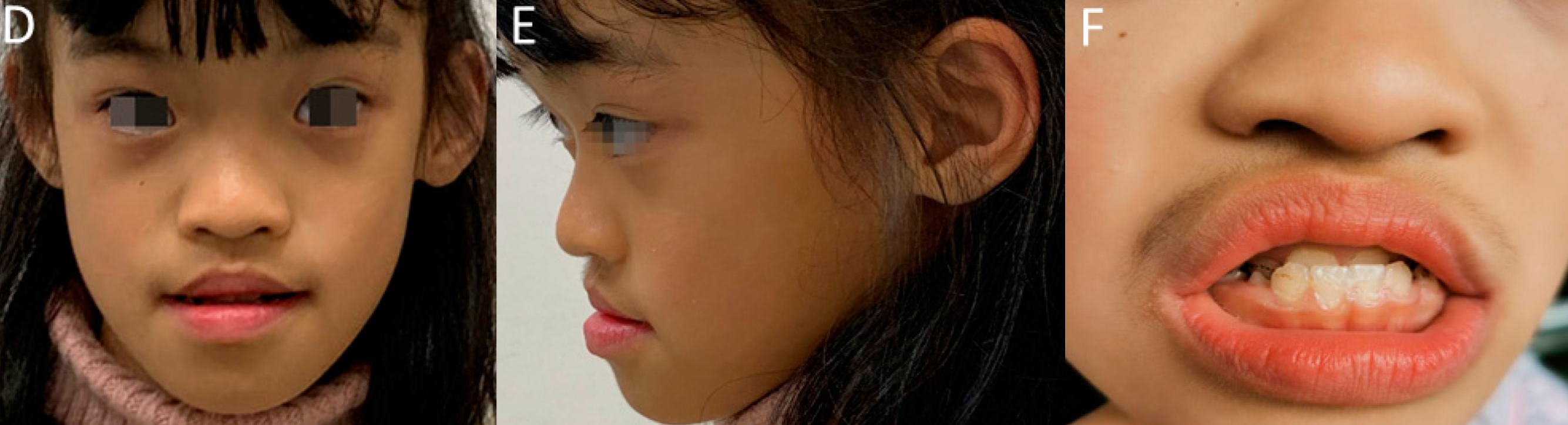
- Facial features associated with Skraban–Deardorff syndrome include broad nasal tip, short philtrum, flat Cupid's bow, wide mouth, widely spaced teeth, and gingival enlargement.
- Specialty: Medical genetics and genomics

Skraban–Deardorff syndrome is an ultra-rare genetic disorder caused by pathogenic variants of the WDR26 gene. It is characterized by global developmental delay, intellectual disability, friendly demeanor, unusual walking, seizures, feeding difficulties and distinct facial features. The condition occurs due to insufficient levels of functional WDR26 protein, which disrupt various cellular mechanisms involved in the development of the nervous system. While cases reported in medical literature have occurred spontaneously (de novo), it can be inherited in an autosomal dominant manner.

Skraban–Deardorff syndrome shares significant clinical overlap with chromosome 1q41q42 microdeletion syndrome. Diagnosis is established through genetic testing in individuals with characteristic features. Management is supportive and individualized, including interventions for developmental and behavioral concerns, educational programs based on cognitive abilities, and treatment of seizures. First described in 2017, approximately 150 individuals have been diagnosed with Skraban–Deardorff syndrome as of 2023.

== Presentation ==
Every individual with Skraban–Deardorff syndrome experiences global developmental delay. Speech is typically delayed, and some individuals remain nonverbal throughout childhood. Gross motor delays are reflected in late milestones—for example, sitting may be delayed by about 11 months, and walking typically begins between 17 and 36 months. Fine motor impairments lead to difficulties with activities of daily living such as eating, putting on clothes and writing. Individuals are generally described as sociable and happy, and have variable degree of intellectual disability. Abnormal and repetitive behaviors like rocking, unusual hand movements and posture are also observed.

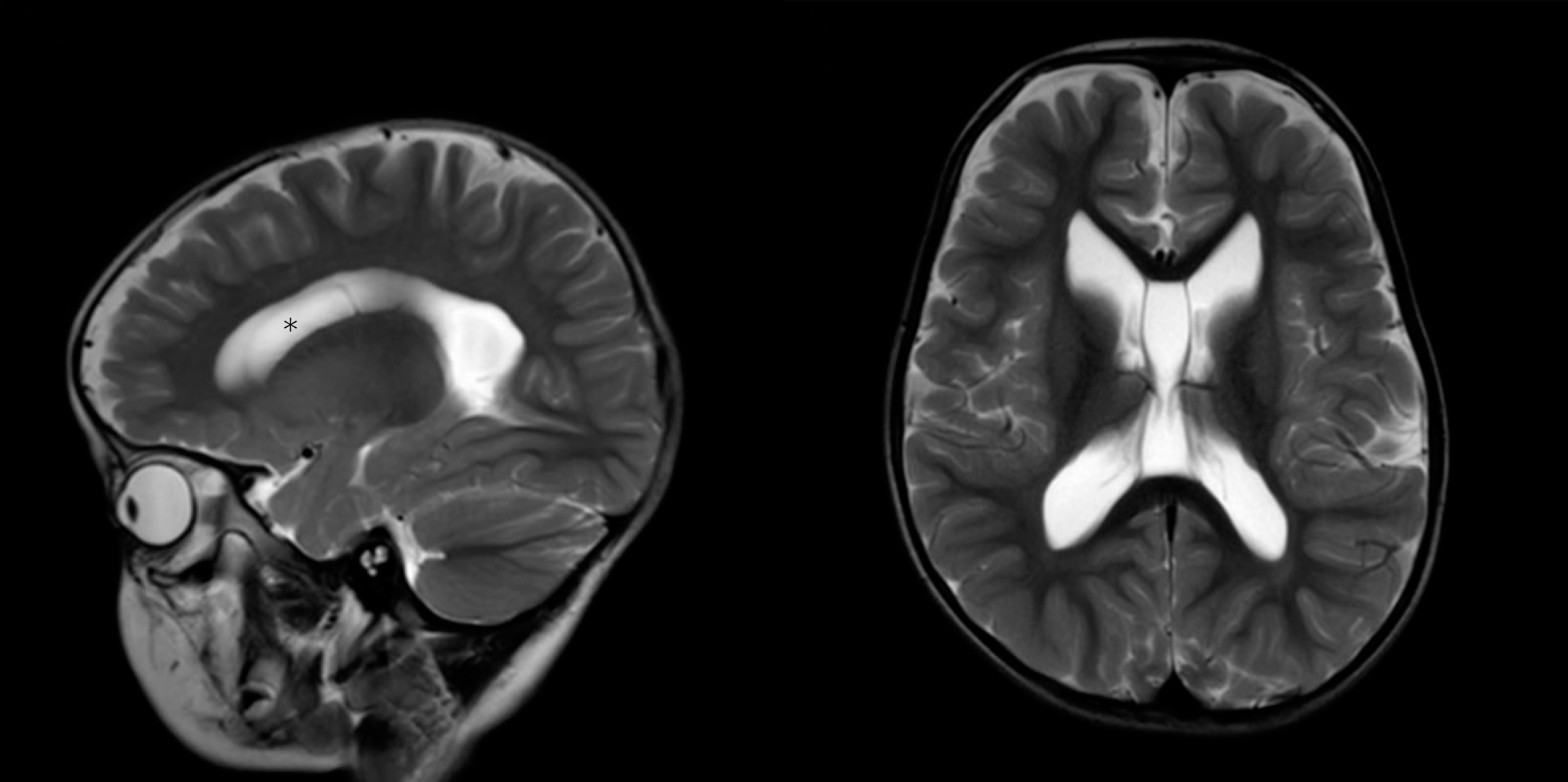
MR Brain of a person with Skraban–Deardorff syndrome depicting large ventricular system, prominent sulci and a subependymal cyst (asterisk)

Seizure disorders are common, and may include generalized tonic–clonic, absence, rolandic and febrile seizures. Neuroimaging usually reveals benign brain anomalies. Other neurodevelopmental findings include mildly decreased muscle tone, poor motor coordination and unusual walking. Feeding difficulties—made worse by decreased tone of muscles—begin in infancy and may lead to failure to thrive. Children can also experience reflux and constipation. Heart defects such as ventricular septal defect and lung conditions like tracheomalacia occur rarely.

Individuals with Skraban–Deardorff syndrome frequently present with distinct facial dysmorphisms. Common features include a coarse facial appearance, broad nasal tip, prominent maxilla, flat Cupid's bow, wide mouth, widely spaced teeth and gingival enlargement. Findings seen less often include microcephaly, cleft palate, short philtrum, pointed chin, small jaw and tapering eyebrows on the sides. The eyes often appear large due to prominent eyebrows and large-appearing irides. Ocular abnormalities such as eye misalignment, lazy eye, near or far-sightedness may also be present. Skeletal findings have been observed in only a few individuals, and have included mild lower limb contractures, high arch of foot, forefoot varus, hip dysplasia and osteopathia striata.

An adult with Skraban–Deardorff syndrome was reported to have syndromic autism, and experience anxiety, psychomotor agitation, sensory overload and avolition.

== Mechanism ==
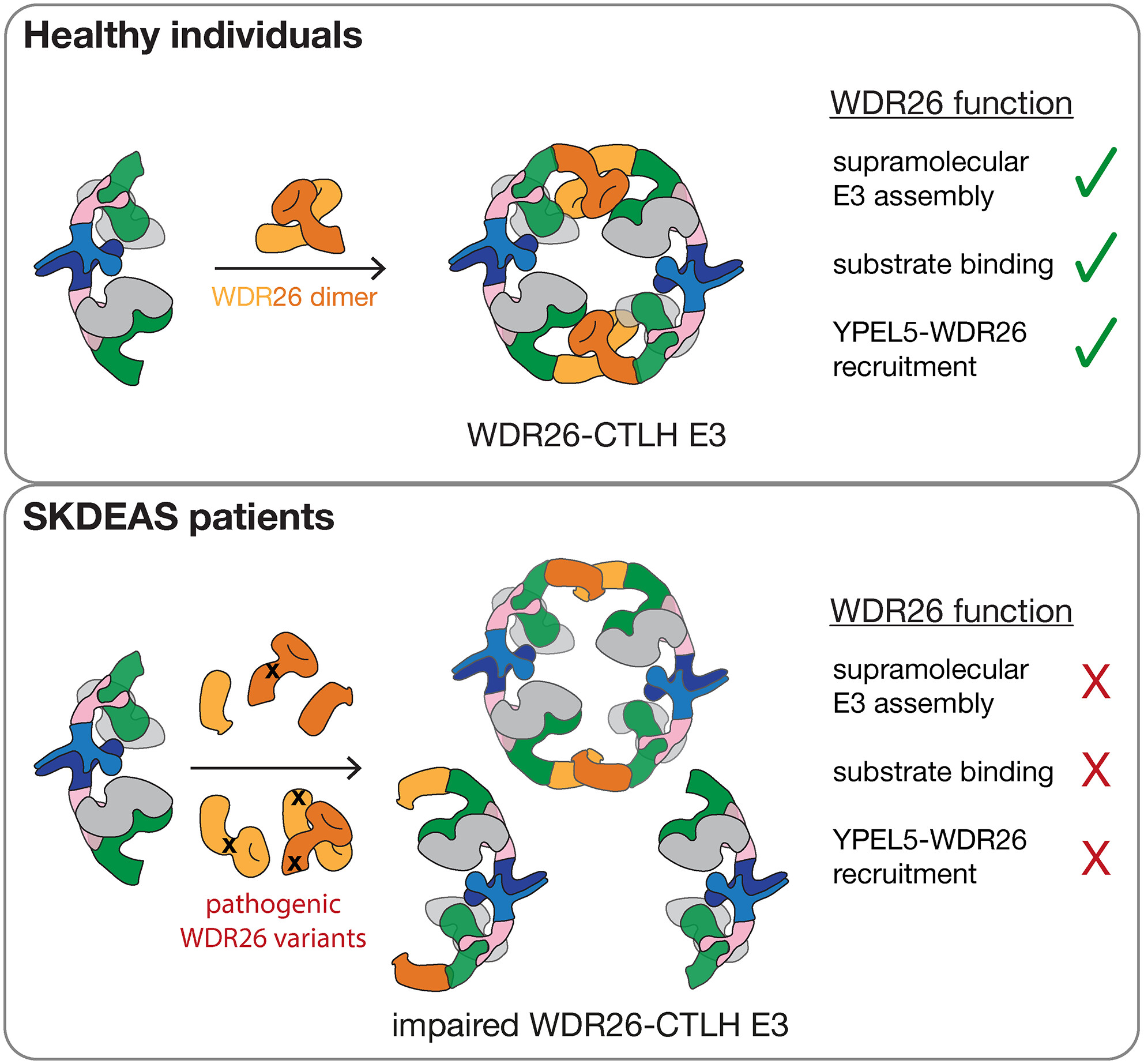
Overview of the molecular function of WDR26 within the CTLH E3 complex, and the cascading effects of its dysfunction

The WDR26 gene provides instructions for making the WD repeat-containing protein 26 (WDR26), which is produced by most human cells. One of WDR26's many roles is to help build a larger structure called the C-terminal to LisH E3 ubiquitin ligase complex (CTLH E3 complex), which marks several proteins for degradation. It also helps anchor another component, Yippee like 5, to support the stability and function of this complex. As a part of its role, WDR26 directs the degradation of specific proteins, such as HMG-box transcription factor 1, a transcriptional repressor involved in gene regulation.

WDR26 also helps stabilize a protein called Ran-binding protein 9 (RANBP9; green components in the image). RANBP9 brings the CTLH complex to DNA regions (chromatin), where it helps control gene expression by affecting how accessible certain genes are to transcription factors like Nuclear factor I and AP-1. Skraban–Deardorff syndrome is caused by pathogenic variants of the WDR26 gene. These variants can occur due to missense, nonsense or frameshift variations. These variants reduce the amount of functional WDR26 protein, disrupting protein degradation, gene regulation and expression—processes important during the development of the nervous system.

A single abnormal copy of the WDR26 gene is sufficient to cause Skraban–Deardorff syndrome, as the remaining normal copy does not produce enough protein for proper function—a mechanism known as haploinsufficiency. Reported cases in the medical literature have been de novo, meaning the variants arose spontaneously and were not inherited from either parent. Because only one abnormal copy is needed to cause disease, the syndrome follows an autosomal dominant inheritance pattern, and an affected individual has a 50% chance of passing it on to each offspring.

The WDR26 gene is located on the long arm of chromosome 1 at 1q42.11–q42.12. Chromosome 1q41q42 microdeletion syndrome results from the loss of several genes, including WDR26. This deletion leads to a phenotype that overlaps significantly with Skraban–Deardorff syndrome. Both conditions share core features such as developmental delays, intellectual disability, seizures and distinctive facial characteristics, resulting from WDR26 haploinsufficiency. However, individuals with 1q41q42 deletions often exhibit additional clinical manifestations not typically seen in Skraban–Deardorff syndrome, likely due to the effects of the loss of other genes in the region.

== Diagnosis ==
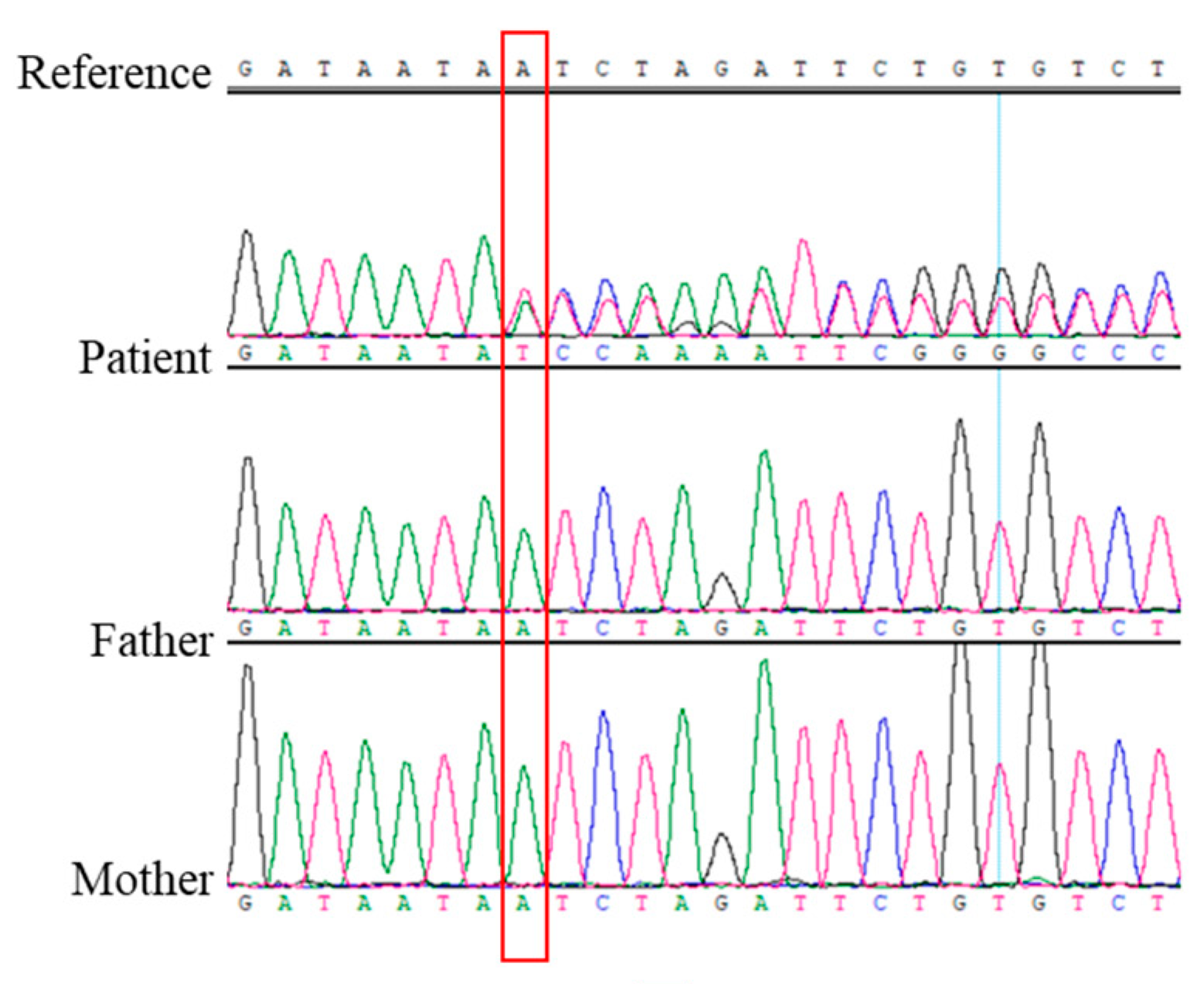
Electropherogram of Sanger sequencing, performed to confirm exome sequencing findings. The results show a frameshift pathogenic variant of the WDR26 gene in the individual, and benign variants in their parents. This indicates that the variant was not inherited but occurred de novo.

In addition to overlapping with chromosome 1q41q42 microdeletion syndrome, Skraban–Deardorff syndrome shares clinical features with several other genetic disorders. These include Angelman syndrome, ATR-X syndrome, Kleefstra syndrome and Pitt–Hopkins syndrome. There is no consensus on diagnostic criteria for Skraban–Deardorff syndrome. Diagnosis involves confirming the presence of a pathogenic or likely pathogenic WDR26 gene variant in an individual with typical clinical characteristics.

When Skraban–Deardorff syndrome is suspected, genetic testing typically includes chromosomal microarray analysis using SNP array or oligonucleotide—able to detect 1q42 microdeletions containing the WDR26 gene. A multi-gene panel that includes the WDR26 gene, or comprehensive genomic testing such as exome or whole genome sequencing—which can discover a broader range of genetic variants—are also used. Exome sequencing is used most often, and if its results are inconclusive, an exome array can be used to identify exon-level deletions or duplications missed by sequencing; although such variants have not been reported to cause the syndrome.

== Management ==
Management of Skraban–Deardorff syndrome focuses on addressing the individual's specific symptoms and developmental needs through a multidisciplinary approach. Specialists routinely involved in care include physician geneticists, developmental pediatricians and neurologists. Genetic counseling is typically involved in helping families understand inheritance patterns, explore implications for family planning, and provide psychosocial support.

Growth parameters and milestones are regularly evaluated to monitor progress. Early intervention is often necessary, and involves physical therapy to improve motor skills, occupational therapy to enhance daily functioning and speech therapy to support language development. An Individualized Education Program can be used to tailor education to a child's cognitive profile and address specific learning needs. Individuals who have experienced seizures may undergo further evaluation with electroencephalography and MR brain. Anticonvulsant medications may be needed based on clinical history. In some cases, temporary feeding tube placement has been required due to failure to thrive and persistent feeding difficulties.

== History ==
Skraban–Deardorff syndrome was first delineated by physician geneticists Cara Skraban and Matthew Deardorff in 2017 at the Children's Hospital of Philadelphia. The syndrome is estimated to be present in approximately 1 in 1,500 individuals with intellectual disability (without an identified cause for their disability). However, only about 150 individuals have been formally diagnosed as of 2023.
