= Jan Schouten =

Jan Schouten may refer to:

- Jan Arnoldus Schouten (1883–1971), Dutch mathematician
- Jan Frederik Schouten (1910–1980), Dutch physicist
- Jan Schouten (geneticist) (born 1956), Dutch geneticist, entrepreneur and philanthropist
