= Kleefstra syndrome =

- Other names: 9q34 deletion syndrome
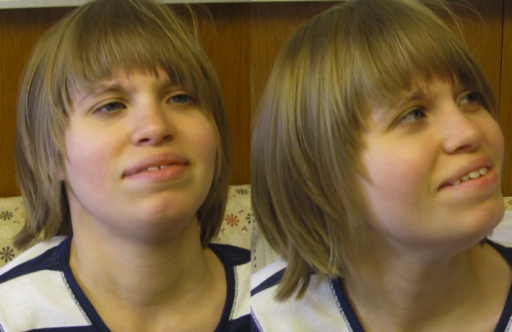
- This photo shows a person with Kleefstra syndrome, with unibrow, relative mandibular prognathism, a short nose with wide base, hypertelorism with epicanthus. Although, not shown in the picture, this person also has overfolded ears that are posteriorly angulated with a deep notch on the left ear lobe.
- Specialty: Medical genetics
- Symptoms: Arched eyebrows, small head circumference, midface hypoplasia, prominent jaw and a pouting lower lip.
- Causes: Genetics.
- Diagnostic method: Fluorescence in situ hybridization, multiplex ligation-dependent probe amplification, array comparative genomic hybridization, and EHMT1 sequencing.
- Differential diagnosis: Down syndrome, Smith-Magenis syndrome, Pitt-Hopkins syndrome, Angelman syndrome, and MBD5 haploinsufficiency.
- Named after: Tjitske Kleefstra

Kleefstra syndrome, also known as 9q34 deletion syndrome, is a rare genetic disorder. Terminal deletions of chromosome 9q34 have been associated with childhood hypotonia, distinctive facial appearance and intellectual disability. Most individuals fall within the moderate to severe range of intellectual disability, while a minority shows mild delays and have total IQ scores within the low-normal range. Typical facial features include arched eyebrows, microcephaly, midface hypoplasia, a prominent jaw and a pouting lower lip. Affected individuals often exhibit speech impairments, including significant speech delays. Severe expressive language delays with limited speech production are common; however, general language development is often more advanced, enabling non-verbal communication. Other common features include epilepsy, congenital and urogenital anomalies, microcephaly, obesity, and psychiatric disorders. Through analysis of chromosomal breakpoints, as well as gene sequencing in suggestive cases, Kleefstra and colleagues identified EHMT1 as the causative gene: this gene is responsible for producing the protein histone methyltransferase whose function is to alter histones. Histone methyltransferases are also important in deactivating certain genes needed for proper growth and development. Moreover, a frameshift, missense, or nonsense error in the coding sequence of EHMT1 can result in this condition in an individual.

== Signs and symptoms ==
Physical symptoms

- Heart defects
- Characteristics of autism
- Genital defects (in males)
- Childhood hypotonia
- Respiratory infections
- Motor delay
- Renal defects
- Severe delay or total lack of speech
- Happy disposition
- Dysmorphic facial features
- Visual issues (hypermetropia)
- Hearing loss (sensorineural and/or conductive)

Behavioural symptoms

- Passiveness
- Sociability
- Aggression
  - Biting or hitting
- Moodiness
- Disliking routine changes
- Extreme apathy

== Genetics ==
9q34.3 deletion syndrome follows an autosomal dominant pattern of inheritance.

Despite the associated effects of Kleefstra Syndrome, there is limited information regarding its lethality. Most documented cases are de novo with the exception of one case due to hereditary factors; however, some cases may result from chromosomal translocations.

In the hereditary case, the mother transferred the EHMT1 point mutation on to her child as she was a carrier of this gene defect. According to Mitter, et al. (2012), the mother's phenotype for the NM_024757.4:c.2712+1G>A mutation exhibits tissue-specific mosaicism. This mutation led to the skipping of exon 18 in the EHMT1 gene, rather than its removal by spliceosomes. In another transcript, however, an intron was inserted between exons 18 and 19 of the EHMT1 gene. The combination of the intron retention and maternalmosaicism was transferred to the child, resulting in the pathogenesis of the disease.

In the past, research showed that the austerity of the disease was directly proportional to the number of EHMT1 deletions prevalent in an individual. The greater the deletions, the greater the severity of the condition. However, recent studies indicate that Kleefstra syndrome (or 9q34 deletion syndrome) may result from a non-functional EHMT1 gene, regardless of whether the gene is deleted or mutated.

== Diagnosis ==
Tests are conducted either at birth or later in early childhood using techniques such as fluorescence in situ hybridization (FISH), multiplex ligation-dependent probe amplification (MLPA), array comparative genomic hybridization (aCGH), and EHMT1 gene sequencing.

FISH is a screening method that uses fluorescently labeled probes or comparative genomic hybridization to find any chromosome irregularities in a genome. It is commonly used for gene mapping, detecting aneuploidy, locating tumours etc. The fluorescent probes hybridize to specific DNA sequences.

MLPA is a test that finds and records DNA copy change numbers through the use of polymerase chain reaction (PCR). This technique can identify chromosomal abnormalities as well as tumor-related copy number variations, such as those found in glial cells of the brain.

Array-based comparative genomic hybridization (aCGH) detects chromosomal deletions and duplications by labelling patient and reference DNA samples with fluorescent dyes and hybridizing them onto microarray slides containing genomic sequences. The DNA fragments analyzed typically range from 25 to 80 base pairs in length.

Finally, EHMT1 gene sequencing involves isolating the DNA strand of the EHMT1 gene and synthesizing complementary strands using DNA polymerase. This process enables scientists to determine the precise nucleotide sequence of the gene, facilitating accurate diagnosis.

== Treatment ==
Individual manifestations are managed by a multidisciplinary team, including speech therapists, physiotherapists, occupational therapists and other healthcare professionals. In particular, it is essential that the individual is monitored by a neurologist to ensure that treatment plans are appropriately adapted over time.

== Emerging treatments ==
Although there is currently no cure for Kleefstra Syndrome, ongoing research is focused on developing targeted therapies that address the underlying causes of the condition. Gene therapy and pharmacological interventions aimed at modulating gene expression represent promising areas of investigation.

== Epidemiology ==
Kleefstra Syndrome affects males and females equally and approximately 75% of documented cases are caused by disruptions in the EHMT1 gene, while the remaining 25% are due to terminal deletions in the 9q34.3 region of chromosome 9. Currently, there are no reliable statistics on life expectancy due to the limited amount of long-term data available.

== History ==
Kleefstra syndrome was first identified in 2006 by Tjitske Kleefstra et al. It is a relatively newly recognized condition, with fewer than 200 reported cases worldwide. Due to the rarity of the syndrome, the historical background and the origin of the condition remain poorly understood.

== Research ==
A study published in the American Journal of Human Genetics conducted an EHMT1 mutation analysis on 23 patients exhibiting symptoms consistent with 9q34 deletion syndrome. The patients varied in age, but the clinical discussion focused on five individuals, most of whom were children. The first patient developed epilepsy early in childhood and experienced persistent speech delays beyond age 8. He had midfacial hypoplasia and prominent facial features, particularly of the lips and mouth. The second patient had mild hypotonia but no family history of mitral regurgitation (MR). The third patient, the oldest at 36, began walking at age 3, experienced weight gain at age 11 anche developed epilepsy in her late twenties. The fourth patient had feeding difficulties in early childhood and was diagnosed with developmental delay. Patient five presented behavioral issues, struggled with MR and was overweight. The researchers identified three novel mutations in the EHMT1 gene: one interstitial deletion, one nonsense mutatione and one frameshift mutation. these findings support the hypothesis that disruptions in EHMT1 contribute to the pathogenesis of Kleefstra Syndrome.

In another study published in the Journal of Medical Genetics, DNA from 40 patients were extracted and analyzed using MLPA, FISH or EHMT1 gene sequencing. The cohort was divided into two groups: 16 patients with a 9q34 deletion, and 24 patients with typical FISH/MPLA results. Researchers examined the potential functional impact of missense mutations using DNA modeling. After screening, results from the first group revealed that six patients had same 700 kb deletion. In the second group, EHMT1 sequencing identified six intragenic mutations. The researchers concluded that these mutations may act as causative factors in the development of the disease. Finally, the patients’ behavioral, physical, and psychiatric features were documented in a detailed data chart.

== See also ==
- EHMT1
- Angelman syndrome
- Kleefstra Syndrome Worldwide Map
