= RRP8 =

Protein-coding gene in the species Homo sapiens

Identifiers
- Aliases: RRP8, KIAA0409, NML, ribosomal RNA processing 8, methyltransferase, homolog (yeast), ribosomal RNA processing 8
- External IDs: OMIM: 615818; MGI: 1914251; GeneCards: RRP8
Available structures
| PDB | Ortholog search: PDBe RCSB |
| PDB | List of PDB id codes 2ZFU |

Gene location (Human)
| Chr. | Chromosome 11 (human) |
| Band | 11p15.4 | Start | 6,595,072 bp |
| Band | 11p15.4 | End | 6,603,616 bp |

Gene location (Mouse)
| Chr. | Chromosome 7 (mouse) |
| Band | 7|7 E3 | Start | 105,380,937 bp |
| Band | 7|7 E3 | End | 105,386,592 bp |
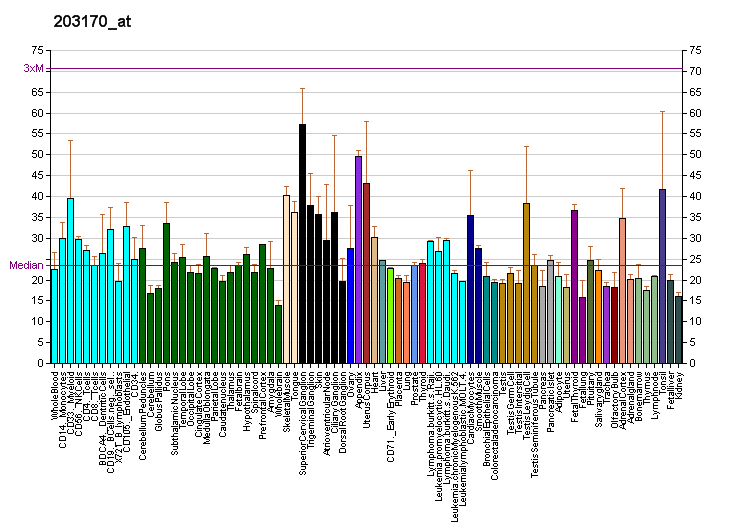

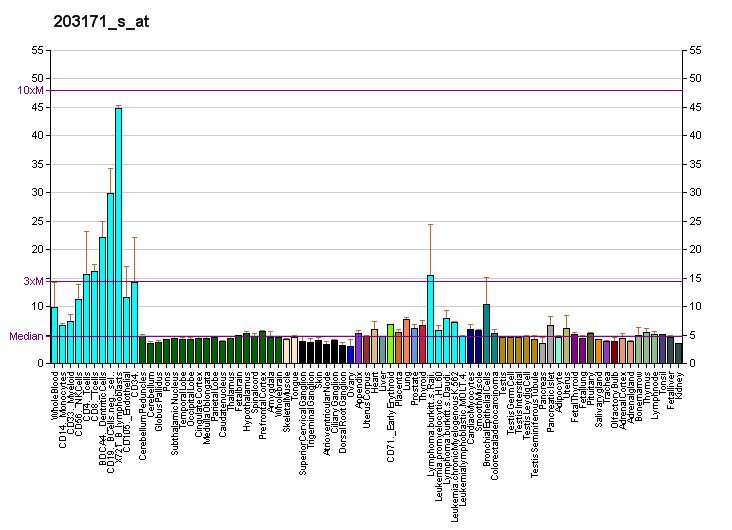
RNA expression pattern
| Bgee | Human / Mouse (ortholog); Top expressed in: muscle layer of sigmoid colon; right lobe of liver; gonad; mucosa of transverse colon; popliteal artery; tibial arteries; ventricular zone; granulocyte; body of uterus; right auricle of heart / Top expressed in: zygote; genital tubercle; tail of embryo; primitive streak; epiblast; ureter; embryo; primary oocyte; embryo; secondary oocyte; More reference expression data |
| BioGPS | More reference expression data |
Gene ontology
| Molecular function | methyltransferase activity; transferase activity; S-adenosylmethionine-dependent methyltransferase activity; methylated histone binding; protein binding; RNA binding |
| Cellular component | plasma membrane; nucleoplasm; rDNA heterochromatin; chromatin silencing complex; nucleolus; nucleus; cytosol |
| Biological process | cellular response to glucose starvation; regulation of transcription, DNA-templated; regulation of transcription by glucose; transcription, DNA-templated; methylation; rDNA heterochromatin assembly; intrinsic apoptotic signaling pathway by p53 class mediator; rRNA processing; chromatin organization |
Sources:Amigo / QuickGO
Orthologs
| Databases | NCBI: entry; OMA: entry |
| Species | Human | Mouse |
| Entrez | 23378 | 101867 |
| Ensembl | ENSG00000132275 | ENSMUSG00000030888 |
| UniProt | O43159 | Q9DB85 |
| RefSeq (mRNA) | NM_015324 | NM_025897; NM_133951 |
| RefSeq (protein) | NP_056139 | NP_080173; NP_598712 |
| Location (UCSC) | Chr 11: 6.6 – 6.6 Mb | Chr 7: 105.38 – 105.39 Mb |
| PubMed search |
- Wikidata
| View/Edit Human | View/Edit Mouse |

Ribosomal RNA-processing protein 8 is a protein that in humans is encoded by the RRP8 gene. The RRP8 protein is involved in regulating and silencing ribosomal DNA as part of the energy-dependent nucleolar silencing complex (eNoSC). In particular, a component of the eNoSC complex, SIRT1, detects glucose starvation via NAD+/NADP+ levels, leading to the deacetylation of histone H3. This triggers another subunit, SUV39H1, to perform dimethylation of H3 at 'Lys-9' (denoted H3K9me2), leading to a silent DNA state. As part of this complex, the RRP8 protein binds to H3K9me2, and may act as methyltransferase, but its substrate(s) are currently unknown.
