= MLPA =

MLPA can stand for:

- Major League Pickleball Australia
- Marine Life Protection Act
- Morningside/Lenox Park Association
- Multilateral Peering Agreement, governs the exchange of traffic between Internet networks
- Multiplex Ligation-dependent Probe Amplification
