= Colleen Niswender =

Vanderbilt University pharmacologist

Colleen M. Niswender is an American pharmacologist who is Associate Professor of Pharmacology at Vanderbilt University and Director of Molecular Pharmacology at the Warren Center for Neuroscience Drug Discovery. Her research includes translational in vitro and in vivo pharmacology investigating the effects of novel modulators on cellular signaling pathways. She is also a member and on the Executive Committee with the Vanderbilt Institute of Chemical Biology.

== Early life and education ==
Niswender earned a Bachelor of Science degree in Pharmacy with Honors in Pharmacology from the University of Toledo in 1991. She received her Ph.D. in Pharmacology from Vanderbilt University in 1996, and completed postdoctoral training in the Department of Pharmacology at Vanderbilt University in 1998, then served as Senior Fellow at the University of Washington until 2003.

== Career ==
In 2004, Niswender became Research Assistant Professor of Pharmacology and Co-Director of Molecular Pharmacology of the Vanderbilt Program in Drug Discovery. She currently serves as the Senior Director of Molecular Pharmacology at the Warren Center for Neuroscience Drug Discovery and Associate Professor of Pharmacology at Vanderbilt University.

== Research ==
Niswender researches high throughput screening, assay development, and in vitro pharmacology. She has worked alongside the Warren Center for Neuroscience Drug Discovery in the drug development process of neurological and psychiatric disorders including schizophrenia, Parkinson's disease, and Rett syndrome. Niswender and her laboratory have been involved in novel drug research for Rett Syndrome, which mainly affects girls under 15 years, for over 10 years.

Niswender's laboratory studies metabotropic glutamate receptors and muscarinic acetylcholine receptors as therapeutic targets for neurodevelopmental disorders such as Alzheimer's disease, Parkinson's, and Pitt-Hopkins Syndrome. Niswender's work has identified opportunities for novel drug and other pharmaceutical treatment pathways with these brain receptors. As of August 2026 Niswender has an h-index of 64 and over 18,000 citations over her approximately 250 publications.

Niswender's research includes using animal models, such as mice, by using metabotropic glutamate receptor 7 to tranmit nerve signals which in turn improves performance in the mice, and helping develop therapeutic pharmaceutical targets.

== Honors and awards ==
2022 Scientific Achievement Award in Drug Discovery and Development from ASPET

2024 Master Innovator Award from Vanderbilt University

2025 Nicholas Hobbs Discovery Award from the Vanderbilt Kennedy Center for her Rett syndrome research

2026 Vanderbilt Chancellor’s Faculty Fellow for fundamental receptor biology, RNA editing, heterodimerization and development of positive allosteric modulators with therapeutic relevance.

== Selected publications ==
- Johnson, Kari; Conn, P.; Niswender, Colleen (1 December 2009). "Glutamate Receptors as Therapeutic Targets for Parkinsons Disease". CNS & Neurological Disorders - Drug Targets. 8 (6): 475–491. doi:10.2174/187152709789824606. PMC 3005251. PMID 19702565.
- Niswender, Colleen M.; Copeland, Sara C.; Herrick-Davis, Katharine; Emeson, Ronald B.; Sanders-Bush, Elaine (1999). "RNA Editing of the Human Serotonin 5-Hydroxytryptamine 2C Receptor Silences Constitutive Activity". Journal of Biological Chemistry. 274 (14): 9472–9478. doi:10.1074/jbc.274.14.9472.
- Niswender, Colleen M.; Conn, P. Jeffrey (1 February 2010). "Metabotropic Glutamate Receptors: Physiology, Pharmacology, and Disease". Annual Review of Pharmacology and Toxicology. 50 (1): 295–322. doi:10.1146/annurev.pharmtox.011008.145533. ISSN 0362-1642. PMC 2904507. PMID 20055706.
- Gregory, Karen J.; Noetzel, Meredith J.; Niswender, Colleen M. (2013). "Pharmacology of Metabotropic Glutamate Receptor Allosteric Modulators". Progress in Molecular Biology and Translational Science. Vol. 115. Elsevier. doi:10.1016/b978-0-12-394587-7.00002-6. ISBN 978-0-12-394587-7.
- Gogliotti, Rocco G.; Fisher, Nicole M.; Stansley, Branden J.; Jones, Carrie K.; Lindsley, Craig W.; Conn, P. Jeffrey; Niswender, Colleen M. (2018). "Total RNA Sequencing of Rett Syndrome Autopsy Samples Identifies the M4 Muscarinic Receptor as a Novel Therapeutic Target". The Journal of Pharmacology and Experimental Therapeutics. 365 (2): 291–300. doi:10.1124/jpet.117.246991. PMC 5878667.
- Lin, Xin; Provasi, Davide; Niswender, Colleen M.; Asher, Wesley B.; Javitch, Jonathan A. (3 October 2024). "Elucidating the molecular logic of a metabotropic glutamate receptor heterodimer". Nature Communications. 15 (1). doi:10.1038/s41467-024-52822-4. ISSN 2041-1723. PMC 11450022. PMID 39362861.
