= EHMT1 =

Protein-coding gene in the species Homo sapiens

Identifiers
- Aliases: EHMT1, EUHMTASE1, Eu-HMTase1, FP13812, GLP, GLP1, KMT1D, bA188C12.1, euchromatic histone lysine methyltransferase 1, EHMT1-IT1, KLEFS1
- External IDs: OMIM: 607001; MGI: 1924933; GeneCards: EHMT1
Available structures
PDB	Ortholog search: PDBe RCSB
PDB	List of PDB id codes 2IGQ, 2RFI, 3B7B, 3B95, 3FPD, 3HNA, 3MO0, 3MO2, 3MO5, 3SW9, 3SWC, 4I51
Enzyme activity
EC #	BRENDA	ExPASy	KEGG	MetaCyc
2.1.1.367	↗	↗	↗	↗

Gene location (Human)
Chr.	Chromosome 9 (human)
Band	9q34.3	Start	137,618,992 bp
Band	9q34.3	End	137,870,016 bp

Gene location (Mouse)
Chr.	Chromosome 2 (mouse)
Band	2|2 A3	Start	24,789,928 bp
Band	2|2 A3	End	24,919,614 bp
RNA expression pattern
Bgee	Human / Mouse (ortholog); Top expressed in: sural nerve; left testis; right testis; left ovary; body of uterus; right hemisphere of cerebellum; skin of leg; granulocyte; ectocervix; right ovary / Top expressed in: hand; Rostral migratory stream; superior cervical ganglion; otolith organ; utricle; maxillary prominence; mandibular prominence; tail of embryo; foot; ganglionic eminence; More reference expression data
BioGPS	n/a
Gene ontology
Molecular function	methyltransferase activity; transferase activity; histone methyltransferase activity (H3-K9 specific); zinc ion binding; C2H2 zinc finger domain binding; histone-lysine N-methyltransferase activity; metal ion binding; histone methyltransferase activity (H3-K27 specific); protein-lysine N-methyltransferase activity; protein binding; p53 binding
Cellular component	nucleoplasm; chromosome; nucleus; nuclear body
Biological process	response to fungicide; embryo development; negative regulation of transcription by RNA polymerase II; peptidyl-lysine monomethylation; histone H3-K27 methylation; DNA methylation; methylation; histone H3-K9 methylation; peptidyl-lysine dimethylation; histone lysine methylation; histone methylation; negative regulation of transcription, DNA-templated; negative regulation of G0 to G1 transition; chromatin organization; regulation of embryonic development; positive regulation of cold-induced thermogenesis; regulation of signal transduction by p53 class mediator
Sources:Amigo / QuickGO
Orthologs
Databases	NCBI: entry; OMA: entry
Species	Human	Mouse
Entrez	79813	77683
Ensembl	ENSG00000181090	ENSMUSG00000036893
UniProt	Q9H9B1	Q5DW34
RefSeq (mRNA)	NM_001145527; NM_024757; NM_001039765; NM_001354259; NM_001354263 NM_001354611; NM_001354612	NM_001012518; NM_001109686; NM_001109687; NM_172545
RefSeq (protein)	NP_001138999; NP_079033; NP_001341188; NP_001341192; NP_001341540 NP_001341541	NP_001012536; NP_001103156; NP_001103157; NP_766133
Location (UCSC)	Chr 9: 137.62 – 137.87 Mb	Chr 2: 24.79 – 24.92 Mb
PubMed search
- Wikidata
View/Edit Human	View/Edit Mouse

Euchromatic histone-lysine N-methyltransferase 1, also known as G9a-like protein (GLP), is a protein that in humans is encoded by the EHMT1 gene.

== Structure ==
EHMT1 messenger RNA is alternatively spliced to produce three predicted protein isoforms. Starting from the N-terminus, the canonical isoform one has eight ankyrin repeats, a pre-SET, and a SET domains. Isoforms two and three have missing or incomplete C-terminal SET domains respectively.

== Function ==
G9A-like protein (GLP) shares an evolutionary conserved SET domain with G9A, responsible for methyltransferase activity. The SET domain primarily functions to establish and maintain H3K9 mono and di-methylation, a marker of faculative heterochromatin. When transiently over expressed, G9A and GLP form homo- and heterodimers via their SET domain. However, endogenously both enzymes function exclusively as a heteromeric complex. Although G9A and GLP can exert their methyltransferase activities independently in vitro, if either G9a or Glp are knocked out in vivo, global levels of H3K9me2 are severely reduced and are equivalent to H3K9me2 levels in G9a and Glp double knockout mice. Therefore, it is thought that G9A cannot compensate for the loss of GLP methyltransferase activity in vivo, and vice versa. Another important functional domain, which G9A and GLP both share, is a region containing ankryin repeats, which is involved in protein-protein interactions. The ankyrin repeat domain also contains H3K9me1 and H3K9me2 binding sites. Therefore, the G9A/GLP complex can both methylate histone tails and bind to mono- and di-methylated H3K9 to recruit molecules, such as DNA methyltransferases, to the chromatin. H3K9me2 is a reversible modification and can be removed by a wide range of histone lysine demethylases (KDMs) including KDM1, KDM3, KDM4 and KDM7 family members.

In addition to their role as histone lysine methyltransferases (HMTs), several studies have shown that G9A/GLP are also able to methylate a wide range of non-histone proteins. However, as most of the reported methylation sites have been derived from mass spectrometry analyses, the function of many of these modifications remain unknown. Nevertheless, increasing evidence suggests methylation of non-histone proteins may influence protein stability, protein-protein interactions and regulate cellular signalling pathways. For example, G9A/GLP can methylate a number of transcription factors to regulate their transcriptional activity, including MyoD, C/EBP, Reptin, p53, MEF2D, MEF2C and MTA1. Furthermore, G9A/GLP are able to methylate non-histone proteins to regulate complexes which recruit DNA methyltransferases to gene promoters to repress transcription via the methylation of CpG islands. Therefore, G9A and/or GLP have wide-ranging roles in development, establishing and maintaining cell identity, cell cycle regulation, and cellular responses to environmental stimuli, which are dependent on their non-histone protein methyltransferase activity.

== Clinical significance ==
Defects in this gene are a cause of chromosome 9q subtelomeric deletion syndrome (9q-syndrome or Kleefstra syndrome-1).

Dysregulation of EHMT1 has been implicated in inflammatory and cardiovascular diseases.
