= USP11 =

Protein-coding gene in the species Homo sapiens

Identifiers
- Aliases: USP11, UHX1, ubiquitin specific peptidase 11
- External IDs: OMIM: 300050; MGI: 2384312; GeneCards: USP11
Available structures
PDB	Ortholog search: PDBe RCSB
PDB	List of PDB id codes 4MEL
Enzyme activity
EC #	BRENDA	ExPASy	KEGG	MetaCyc
3.4.19.12	↗	↗	↗	↗

Gene location (Human)
Chr.	X chromosome (human)
Band	Xp11.3	Start	47,232,866 bp
Band	Xp11.3	End	47,248,328 bp

Gene location (Mouse)
Chr.	X chromosome (mouse)
Band	X|X A1.3	Start	20,570,145 bp
Band	X|X A1.3	End	20,586,778 bp
RNA expression pattern
Bgee	Human / Mouse (ortholog); Top expressed in: right frontal lobe; middle temporal gyrus; pituitary gland; anterior pituitary; right hemisphere of cerebellum; entorhinal cortex; postcentral gyrus; superior frontal gyrus; nucleus accumbens; dorsolateral prefrontal cortex / Top expressed in: dorsomedial hypothalamic nucleus; arcuate nucleus; paraventricular nucleus of hypothalamus; median eminence; central gray substance of midbrain; ventromedial nucleus; supraoptic nucleus; lateral hypothalamus; anterior amygdaloid area; habenula; More reference expression data
BioGPS	n/a
Gene ontology
Molecular function	peptidase activity; cysteine-type endopeptidase activity; cysteine-type peptidase activity; protein binding; hydrolase activity; thiol-dependent deubiquitinase
Cellular component	cytoplasm; nucleus; nucleoplasm; cytosol; chromosome
Biological process	ubiquitin-dependent protein catabolic process; proteolysis; protein deubiquitination
Sources:Amigo / QuickGO
Orthologs
Databases	NCBI: entry; OMA: entry
Species	Human	Mouse
Entrez	8237	236733
Ensembl	ENSG00000102226	ENSMUSG00000031066
UniProt	P51784	Q99K46
RefSeq (mRNA)	NM_004651; NM_001371072	NM_145628; NM_001358931
RefSeq (protein)	NP_001358001	NP_663603; NP_001345860
Location (UCSC)	Chr X: 47.23 – 47.25 Mb	Chr X: 20.57 – 20.59 Mb
PubMed search
- Wikidata
View/Edit Human	View/Edit Mouse

Ubiquitin carboxyl-terminal hydrolase or Ubiquitin specific protease 11 is an enzyme that in humans is encoded by the USP11 gene. USP11 belongs to the Ubiquitin specific proteases family (USPs) which is a sub-family of the Deubiquitinating enzymes (DUBs).USPs are multiple domain proteases and belong to the C19 cysteine proteases sub‒family. Depending on their domain architecture and position there is different homology between the various members. Generally the largest domain is the catalytic domain which harbours the three residue catalytic triad that is included inside conserved motifs (Cys and His boxes). The catalytic domain also contains sequences that are not related to the catalysis function and their role is mostly not clearly understood at present, the length of these sequences varies for each USP and therefore the length of the whole catalytic domain can range from approximately 295 to 850 amino acids. Particular sequences inside the catalytic domain or at the N‒terminus of some USPs have been characterised as UBL (Ubiquitin like) and DUSP (domain present in ubiquitin‒specific proteases) domains respectively. In some cases, regarding the UBL domains, it has been reported to have a catalysis enhancing function as in the case of USP7. In addition, a so‒called DU domain module is the combination of a DUSP domain followed by a UBL domain separated by a linker and is found in USP11 as well as in USP15 and USP4.

USP11 is 963aa protein with a MW of approximately 109.8 kDa and a pI of ~5.28; it shares significant homology with USP15 and along with USP4 forms the DU subfamily. Nevertheless, alignment of the three USPs confirms that USP15 and USP4 are the closest homologues with the identity reaching ~73 % between their UBL1 domains whereas USP11 is the most distant member with an identity of only ~32.3 % when compared to USP15. An UBL2 domain insertion (285aa) is present within the catalytic domain, which encompasses amino acids 310‒931, and the catalytic triad consists of a cysteine, a histidine and an aspartic acid.

== Function ==
Protein ubiquitination controls many intracellular processes, including cell cycle progression, transcriptional activation, and signal transduction. This dynamic process, involving ubiquitin conjugating enzymes and deubiquitinating enzymes, adds and removes ubiquitin. Deubiquitinating enzymes are cysteine proteases that specifically cleave ubiquitin from ubiquitin-conjugated protein substrates. This gene encodes a deubiquitinating enzyme which lies in a gene cluster on chromosome Xp11.23

== Interactions ==
USP11 has been shown to interact with RANBP9.
