= EHMT2 =

Protein-coding gene in the species Homo sapiens

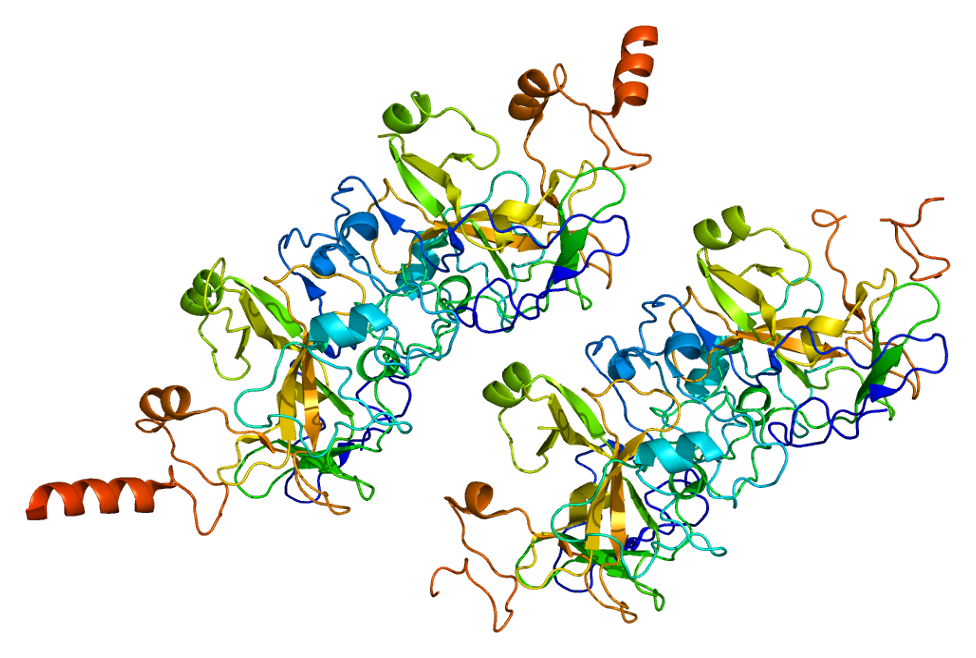

Identifiers
- Aliases: EHMT2, BAT8, C6orf30, G9A, GAT8, KMT1C, NG36, euchromatic histone lysine methyltransferase 2
- External IDs: OMIM: 604599; MGI: 2148922; GeneCards: EHMT2
Available structures
PDB	Ortholog search: PDBe RCSB
PDB	List of PDB id codes 2O8J, 3DM1, 3K5K, 3RJW, 4NVQ, 5JJ0, 5JHN, 5JIN
Enzyme activity
EC #	BRENDA	ExPASy	KEGG	MetaCyc
2.1.1.367	↗	↗	↗	↗

Gene location (Human)
Chr.	Chromosome 6 (human)
Band	6p21.33	Start	31,879,759 bp
Band	6p21.33	End	31,897,687 bp

Gene location (Mouse)
Chr.	Chromosome 17 (mouse)
Band	17 B1|17 18.45 cM	Start	35,117,445 bp
Band	17 B1|17 18.45 cM	End	35,133,028 bp
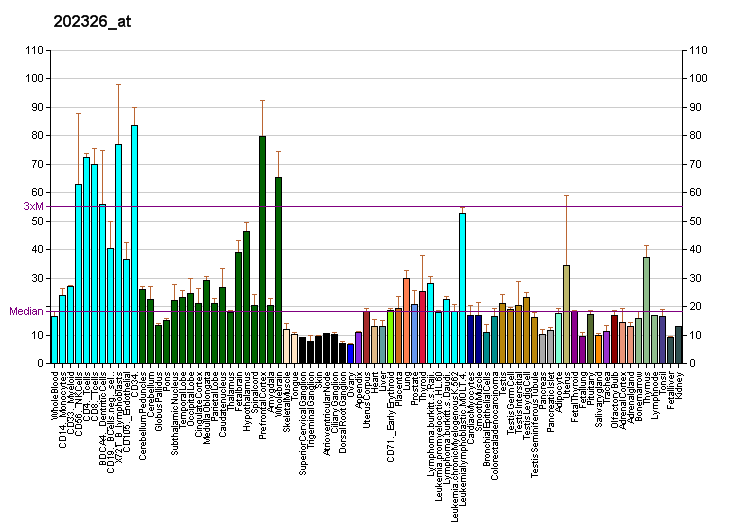

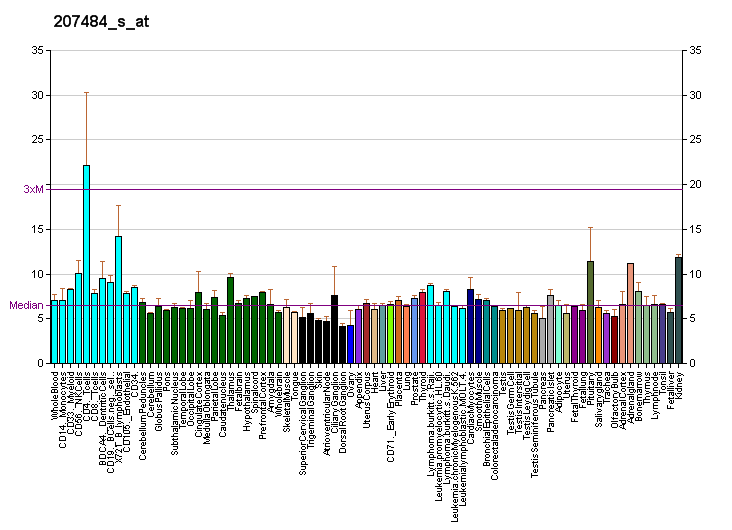
RNA expression pattern
Bgee	Human / Mouse (ortholog); Top expressed in: nucleus accumbens; ganglionic eminence; putamen; ventricular zone; right frontal lobe; right hemisphere of cerebellum; caudate nucleus; temporal lobe; amygdala; anterior cingulate cortex / Top expressed in: Gonadal ridge; spermatid; entorhinal cortex; ventricular zone; seminiferous tubule; perirhinal cortex; spermatocyte; superior frontal gyrus; dentate gyrus of hippocampal formation granule cell; primary visual cortex; More reference expression data
BioGPS	More reference expression data
Gene ontology
Molecular function	methyltransferase activity; transferase activity; histone methyltransferase activity (H3-K9 specific); promoter-specific chromatin binding; zinc ion binding; C2H2 zinc finger domain binding; histone-lysine N-methyltransferase activity; metal ion binding; histone methyltransferase activity (H3-K27 specific); protein-lysine N-methyltransferase activity; protein binding; p53 binding
Cellular component	nucleoplasm; chromosome; nucleus; nuclear speck
Biological process	regulation of DNA replication; cellular response to starvation; negative regulation of transcription by RNA polymerase II; DNA methylation; methylation; peptidyl-lysine dimethylation; histone lysine methylation; histone methylation; histone H3-K27 methylation; histone H3-K9 methylation; negative regulation of G0 to G1 transition; chromatin organization; regulation of signal transduction by p53 class mediator
Sources:Amigo / QuickGO
Orthologs
Databases	NCBI: entry; OMA: entry
Species	Human	Mouse
Entrez	10919	110147
Ensembl	ENSG00000238134; ENSG00000224143; ENSG00000206376; ENSG00000204371; ENSG00000227333 ENSG00000232045; ENSG00000236759	ENSMUSG00000013787
UniProt	Q96KQ7	Q9Z148
RefSeq (mRNA)	NM_001289413; NM_006709; NM_025256; NM_001318833; NM_001363689 NM_001395160; NM_001395161; NM_001395162; NM_001395163; NM_001395164; NM_001395165	NM_001286573; NM_001286575; NM_145830; NM_147151
RefSeq (protein)	NP_001276342; NP_001305762; NP_006700; NP_079532; NP_001350618	NP_001273502; NP_001273504; NP_665829; NP_671493; NP_001390796 NP_001390798; NP_001390799
Location (UCSC)	Chr 6: 31.88 – 31.9 Mb	Chr 17: 35.12 – 35.13 Mb
PubMed search
- Wikidata
View/Edit Human	View/Edit Mouse

Euchromatic histone-lysine N-methyltransferase 2 (EHMT2), also known as G9a, is a histone methyltransferase enzyme that in humans is encoded by the EHMT2 gene. G9a deposits the mono- and di-methylated states of histone H3 at lysine residue 9 (i.e., H3K9me1 and H3K9me2) and lysine residue 27 (H3K27me1 and H3K27me2). The presence of H3K9me1/2 is usually associated with gene silencing.

== Function ==
A cluster of genes, BAT1-BAT5, has been localized in the vicinity of the genes for TNF alpha and TNF beta. This gene is found near this cluster; it was mapped near the gene for C2 within a 120-kb region that included a HSP70 gene pair. These genes are all within the human major histocompatibility complex class III region. This gene was thought to be two different genes, NG36 and G9a, adjacent to each other but a recent publication shows that there is only a single gene. The protein encoded by this gene is thought to be involved in intracellular protein-protein interaction. There are three alternatively spliced transcript variants of this gene but only two are fully described.

G9a and G9a-like protein, another histone-lysine N-methyltransferase, catalyze the synthesis of H3K9me2, which is a repressive mark. G9a is an important control mechanism for epigenetic regulation within the nucleus accumbens (NAcc); reduced G9a expression in the NAcc plays a central role in mediating the development of an addiction. G9a opposes increases in ΔFosB expression via H3K9me2 and is suppressed by ΔFosB. G9a exerts opposite effects to that of ΔFosB on drug-related behavior (e.g., self-administration) and synaptic remodeling (e.g., dendritic arborization – the development of additional tree-like dendritic branches and spines) in the nucleus accumbens, and therefore opposes ΔFosB's function as well as increases in its expression. G9a and ΔFosB share many of the same gene targets. In addition to its role in the nucleus accumbens, G9a play a critical role in the development and the maintenance of neuropathic pain. Following peripheral nerve injury, G9a regulates the expression of +600 genes in the dorsal root ganglia. This transcriptomic change reprograms the sensory neurons to a hyperexcitable state leading to mechanical pain hypersensitivity.

== Interactions ==
EHMT2 has been shown to interact with KIAA0515 and the prostate tissue associated homeodomain protein NKX3.1.

== EHMT2 in cancer ==
EHMT2 is known to drive process such as self-renewal and tumorigenicity, and its dysregulation can be associated with cancer. Abnormal EHMT2 expression is found both in haematological malignancies, as for example leukemia, and in solid tumors, as colorectal cancer, lung cancer, head and neck tumours.
