= TCF4 =

Protein-coding gene in the species Homo sapiens

Identifiers
- Aliases: TCF4, E2-2, ITF-2, ITF2, PTHS, SEF-2, SEF2, SEF2-1, SEF2-1A, SEF2-1B, SEF2-1D, TCF-4, bHLHb19, FECD3, transcription factor 4, CDG2T
- External IDs: OMIM: 602272; MGI: 98506; GeneCards: TCF4
Available structures
PDB	Ortholog search: PDBe RCSB
PDB	List of PDB id codes 2KWF

Gene location (Human)
Chr.	Chromosome 18 (human)
Band	18q21.2	Start	55,222,185 bp
Band	18q21.2	End	55,664,787 bp

Gene location (Mouse)
Chr.	Chromosome 18 (mouse)
Band	18|18 E2	Start	69,343,356 bp
Band	18|18 E2	End	69,689,079 bp
RNA expression pattern
Bgee	Human / Mouse (ortholog); Top expressed in: endothelial cell; skin of hip; pericardium; entorhinal cortex; parietal lobe; Achilles tendon; postcentral gyrus; Brodmann area 23; synovial joint; ganglionic eminence / Top expressed in: Rostral migratory stream; ganglionic eminence; medial ganglionic eminence; subiculum; ventricular zone; barrel cortex; lobe of cerebellum; dermis; internal carotid artery; hippocampus proper; More reference expression data
BioGPS	n/a
Gene ontology
Molecular function	protein dimerization activity; protein homodimerization activity; DNA-binding transcription factor activity; DNA-binding transcription activator activity, RNA polymerase II-specific; bHLH transcription factor binding; E-box binding; protein C-terminus binding; protein binding; identical protein binding; TFIIB-class transcription factor binding; protein heterodimerization activity; DNA binding; RNA polymerase II cis-regulatory region sequence-specific DNA binding; DNA-binding transcription factor activity, RNA polymerase II-specific
Cellular component	transcription regulator complex; nucleus; beta-catenin-TCF complex; beta-catenin-TCF7L2 complex
Biological process	cell differentiation; regulation of transcription, DNA-templated; protein-DNA complex assembly; transcription, DNA-templated; nervous system development; positive regulation of transcription, DNA-templated; DNA-templated transcription, initiation; transcription initiation from RNA polymerase II promoter; positive regulation of transcription by RNA polymerase II; positive regulation of neuron differentiation
Sources:Amigo / QuickGO
Orthologs
Databases	NCBI: entry; OMA: entry
Species	Human	Mouse
Entrez	6925	21413
Ensembl	ENSG00000196628	ENSMUSG00000053477
UniProt	P15884	Q60722
RefSeq (mRNA)	NM_001083962; NM_001243226; NM_001243227; NM_001243228; NM_001243230 NM_001243231; NM_001243232; NM_001243233; NM_001243234; NM_001243235; NM_001243236; NM_001306207; NM_001306208; NM_003199; NM_001330604; NM_001330605; NM_001348211; NM_001348212; NM_001348213; NM_001348214; NM_001348215; NM_001348216; NM_001348217; NM_001348218; NM_001348219; NM_001348220; NM_001369572; NM_001369573; NM_001369574; NM_001369575; NM_001369576; NM_001369577; NM_001369578; NM_001369579; NM_001369580; NM_001369581; NM_001369582; NM_001369583; NM_001369584; NM_001369585; NM_001369586; NM_001369567; NM_001369568; NM_001369569; NM_001369570; NM_001369571	NM_001083967; NM_013685; NM_001361126; NM_001361127; NM_001361128 NM_001361129
RefSeq (protein)	NP_001077431; NP_001230155; NP_001230156; NP_001230157; NP_001230159 NP_001230160; NP_001230161; NP_001230162; NP_001230163; NP_001230164; NP_001230165; NP_001293136; NP_001293137; NP_001317533; NP_001317534; NP_003190; NP_001335140; NP_001335141; NP_001335142; NP_001335143; NP_001335144; NP_001335145; NP_001335146; NP_001335147; NP_001335148; NP_001335149; NP_001356501; NP_001356502; NP_001356503; NP_001356504; NP_001356505; NP_001356506; NP_001356507; NP_001356508; NP_001356509; NP_001356510; NP_001356511; NP_001356512; NP_001356513; NP_001356514; NP_001356515; NP_001356496; NP_001356497; NP_001356498; NP_001356499; NP_001356500	NP_001077436; NP_038713; NP_001348055; NP_001348056; NP_001348057 NP_001348058
Location (UCSC)	Chr 18: 55.22 – 55.66 Mb	Chr 18: 69.34 – 69.69 Mb
PubMed search
- Wikidata
View/Edit Human	View/Edit Mouse

Transcription factor 4 (TCF-4) also known as immunoglobulin transcription factor 2 (ITF-2) is a protein that in humans is encoded by the TCF4 gene located on chromosome 18q21.2.

== Function ==
TCF4 proteins act as transcription factors which will bind to the immunoglobulin enhancer mu-E5/kappa-E2 motif. TCF4 activates transcription by binding to the E-box (5′-CANNTG-3′) found usually on SSTR2-INR, or somatostatin receptor 2 initiator element. TCF4 is primarily involved in neurological development of the fetus during pregnancy by initiating neural differentiation by binding to DNA. It is found in the central nervous system, somites, and gonadal ridge during early development. Later in development it will be found in the thyroid, thymus, and kidneys while in adulthood TCF4 it is found in lymphocytes, muscles, mature neurons, and gastrointestinal system.

== Clinical significance ==
Mutations in TCF4 cause Pitt–Hopkins syndrome (PTHS). These mutations cause TCF4 proteins to not bind to DNA properly and control the differentiation of the nervous system. It has been suggested that TCF4 loss-of-function leads to decreased Wnt signaling and, consequently, a reduced neural progenitor proliferation. In most cases that have been studied, the mutations were de novo, meaning it was a new mutation not found in other family members of the patient. Common symptoms of Pitt-Hopkins Syndrome include a wide mouth, gastrointestinal problems, developmental delay of fine motor skills, speech and breathing problems, epilepsy, and other brain defects.
