= PRRC2B =

Protein-coding gene in the species Homo sapiens

Identifiers
- Aliases: PRRC2B, BAT2L, BAT2L1, KIAA0515, LQFBS-1, proline rich coiled-coil 2B
- External IDs: MGI: 1923304; GeneCards: PRRC2B

Gene location (Human)
Chr.	Chromosome 9 (human)
Band	9q34.13	Start	131,373,636 bp
Band	9q34.13	End	131,500,197 bp

Gene location (Mouse)
Chr.	Chromosome 2 (mouse)
Band	2|2 B	Start	32,041,094 bp
Band	2|2 B	End	32,124,549 bp
RNA expression pattern
Bgee	Human / Mouse (ortholog); Top expressed in: sural nerve; ventricular zone; ganglionic eminence; epithelium of colon; prefrontal cortex; right hemisphere of cerebellum; cerebellar vermis; stromal cell of endometrium; left ovary; gastric mucosa / Top expressed in: superior cervical ganglion; hand; nucleus of stria terminalis; vestibular membrane of cochlear duct; trigeminal ganglion; Rostral migratory stream; dentate gyrus of hippocampal formation granule cell; otic vesicle; otolith organ; central gray substance of midbrain; More reference expression data
BioGPS	n/a
Orthologs
Databases	NCBI: entry; OMA: entry
Species	Human	Mouse
Entrez	84726	227723
Ensembl	ENSG00000130723	ENSMUSG00000039262
UniProt	Q5JSZ5	Q7TPM1
RefSeq (mRNA)	NM_032640; NM_013318	NM_001159634; NM_172661
RefSeq (protein)	NP_037450	NP_001153106; NP_766249
Location (UCSC)	Chr 9: 131.37 – 131.5 Mb	Chr 2: 32.04 – 32.12 Mb
PubMed search
- Wikidata
View/Edit Human	View/Edit Mouse

Protein PRRC2B is a protein that in humans is encoded by the PRRC2B gene.

== Interactions ==
PRRC2B has been shown to interact with EHMT2.
