= WDR26 =

Protein-coding gene in humans

Identifiers
- Aliases: WDR26, CDW2, GID7, MIP2, WD repeat domain 26, SKDEAS
- External IDs: OMIM: 617424; MGI: 1923825; GeneCards: WDR26

Gene location (Human)
Chr.	Chromosome 1 (human)
Band	1q42.11-q42.12	Start	224,385,146 bp
Band	1q42.11-q42.12	End	224,437,033 bp

Gene location (Mouse)
Chr.	Chromosome 1 (mouse)
Band	1|1 H4	Start	181,000,793 bp
Band	1|1 H4	End	181,039,566 bp
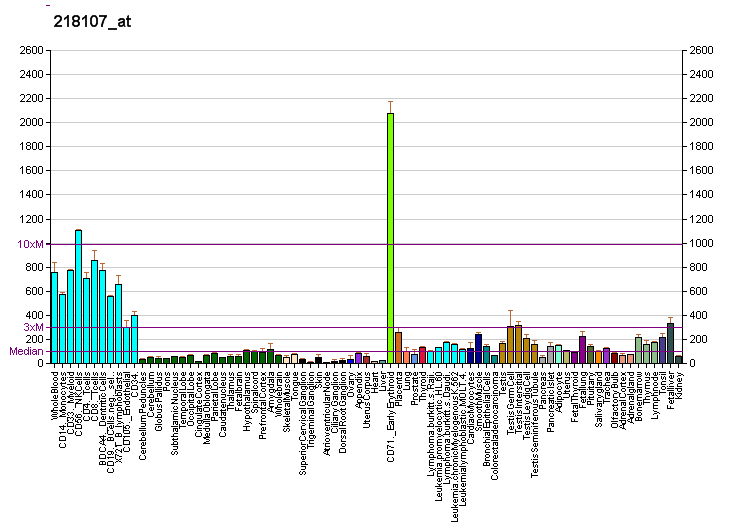
RNA expression pattern
Bgee	Human / Mouse (ortholog); Top expressed in: sperm; secondary oocyte; mucosa of pharynx; epithelium of colon; bone marrow cell; stromal cell of endometrium; trabecular bone; oral cavity; skin of thigh; amniotic fluid / Top expressed in: aortic valve; ascending aorta; human fetus; Rostral migratory stream; blood; tibiofemoral joint; parotid gland; left lung lobe; skin of external ear; epithelium of lens; More reference expression data
BioGPS	More reference expression data
Orthologs
Databases	NCBI: entry; OMA: entry
Species	Human	Mouse
Entrez	80232	226757
Ensembl	ENSG00000162923	ENSMUSG00000038733
UniProt	Q9H7D7	Q8C6G8
RefSeq (mRNA)	NM_001115113; NM_025160; NM_001379403	NM_145514
RefSeq (protein)	NP_001108585; NP_079436; NP_001366332	NP_663489; NP_001390510; NP_001390511; NP_001390512; NP_001390513 NP_001390514; NP_001390515; NP_001390516; NP_001390517; NP_001390518
Location (UCSC)	Chr 1: 224.39 – 224.44 Mb	Chr 1: 181 – 181.04 Mb
PubMed search
- Wikidata
View/Edit Human	View/Edit Mouse

WD repeat-containing protein 26 is a protein that in humans is encoded by the WDR26 gene.

== Function ==
This gene encodes a member of the WD repeat protein family. WD repeats are minimally conserved regions of approximately 40 amino acids typically bracketed by gly-his and trp-asp (GH-WD), which may facilitate formation of heterotrimeric or multiprotein complexes. Members of this family are involved in a variety of cellular processes, including cell cycle progression, signal transduction, apoptosis, and gene regulation.

== Clinical significance ==
Pathogenic variants of the gene cause Skraban–Deardorff syndrome.
