= RANBP9 =

Protein-coding gene in the species Homo sapiens

Identifiers
- Aliases: RANBP9, Ranbp9, IBAP-1, Ibap1, RanBPM, BPM-L, BPM90, RanBP7, RAN binding protein 9
- External IDs: OMIM: 603854; MGI: 1928741; GeneCards: RANBP9

Gene location (Human)
Chr.	Chromosome 6 (human)
Band	6p23	Start	13,621,498 bp
Band	6p23	End	13,711,835 bp

Gene location (Mouse)
Chr.	Chromosome 13 (mouse)
Band	13|13 A4	Start	43,556,151 bp
Band	13|13 A4	End	43,634,758 bp
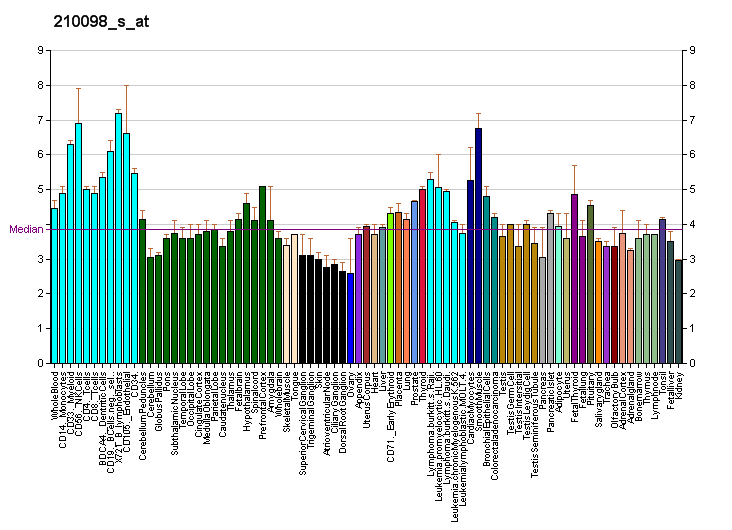

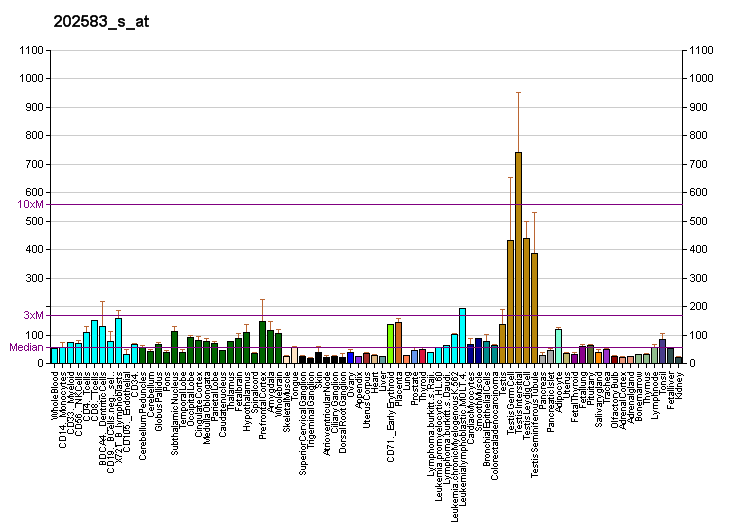

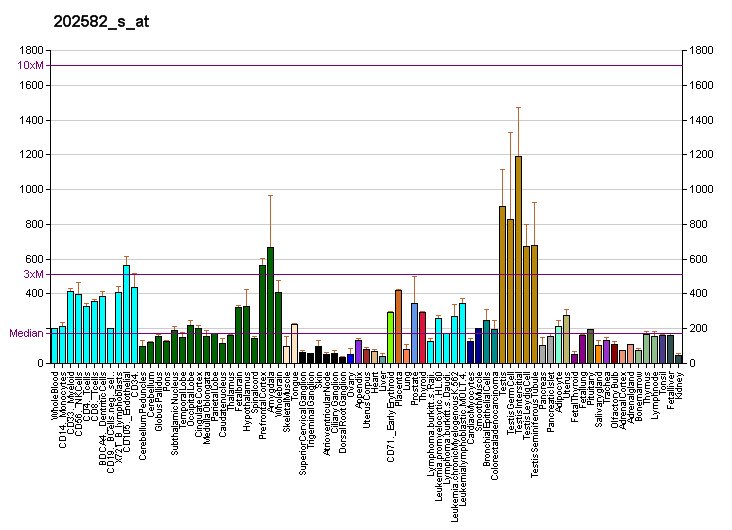
RNA expression pattern
Bgee	Human / Mouse (ortholog); Top expressed in: sperm; secondary oocyte; Brodmann area 23; endothelial cell; amniotic fluid; oral cavity; mucosa of pharynx; skin of thigh; human penis; gingival epithelium / Top expressed in: zygote; secondary oocyte; spermatid; spermatocyte; ascending aorta; seminiferous tubule; aortic valve; granulocyte; tail of embryo; genital tubercle; More reference expression data
BioGPS	More reference expression data
Gene ontology
Molecular function	enzyme binding; protein binding
Cellular component	cytoplasm; cytosol; plasma membrane; membrane; nucleus; microtubule associated complex; ubiquitin ligase complex
Biological process	negative regulation of ERK1 and ERK2 cascade; microtubule nucleation; axon guidance; MAPK cascade; protein-containing complex assembly
Sources:Amigo / QuickGO
Orthologs
Databases	NCBI: entry; OMA: entry
Species	Human	Mouse
Entrez	10048	56705
Ensembl	ENSG00000010017	ENSMUSG00000038546
UniProt	Q96S59	P69566
RefSeq (mRNA)	NM_005493	NM_019930
RefSeq (protein)	NP_005484	NP_064314; NP_001391577
Location (UCSC)	Chr 6: 13.62 – 13.71 Mb	Chr 13: 43.56 – 43.63 Mb
PubMed search
- Wikidata
View/Edit Human	View/Edit Mouse

Ran-binding protein 9 is a protein that in humans is encoded by the RANBP9 gene.

== Function ==
This gene encodes a protein that binds RAN, a small GTP binding protein belonging to the RAS superfamily that is essential for the translocation of RNA and proteins through the nuclear pore complex. The protein encoded by this gene has also been shown to interact with several other proteins, including met proto-oncogene, homeodomain interacting protein kinase 2, androgen receptor, and cyclin-dependent kinase 11.

== Interactions ==
RANBP9 has been shown to interact with:

- Androgen receptor,
- C-Met,
- DISC1,
- DYRK1B,
- Glucocorticoid receptor,
- HIPK2
- MKLN1,
- S100A7, and
- USP11.
