= RMND5B =

Protein-coding gene in the species Homo sapiens

Identifiers
- Aliases: RMND5B, GID2, GID2B, required for meiotic nuclear division 5 homolog B
- External IDs: MGI: 1913339; GeneCards: RMND5B
Enzyme activity
EC #	BRENDA	ExPASy	KEGG	MetaCyc
2.3.2.27	↗	↗	↗	↗

Gene location (Human)
Chr.	Chromosome 5 (human)
Band	5q35.3	Start	178,130,996 bp
Band	5q35.3	End	178,150,568 bp

Gene location (Mouse)
Chr.	Chromosome 11 (mouse)
Band	11|11 B1.3	Start	51,514,498 bp
Band	11|11 B1.3	End	51,526,723 bp
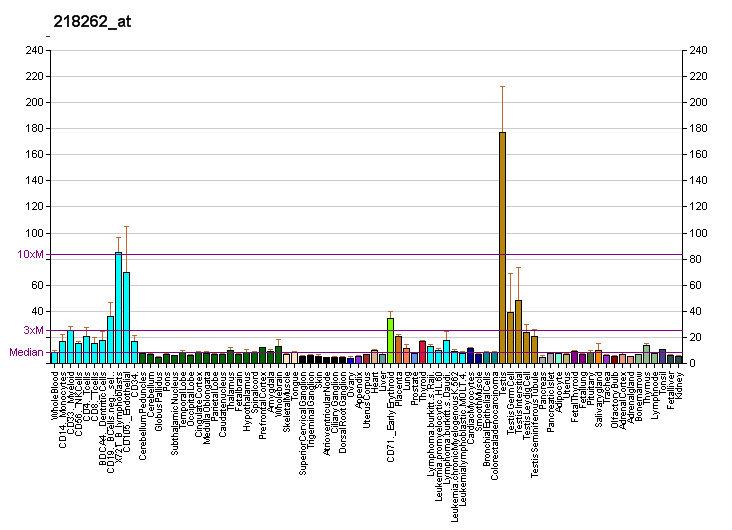

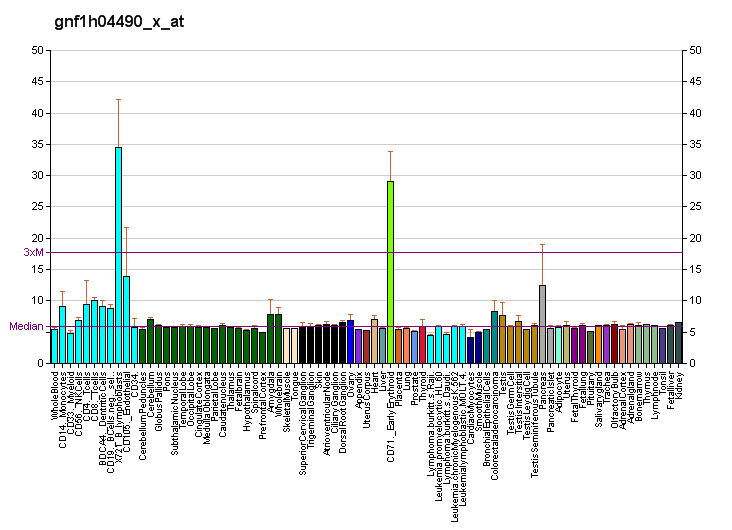
RNA expression pattern
Bgee	Human / Mouse (ortholog); Top expressed in: left testis; right testis; apex of heart; gastrocnemius muscle; muscle of thigh; prefrontal cortex; epithelium of esophagus; skin of leg; anterior pituitary; ectocervix / Top expressed in: granulocyte; interventricular septum; spermatid; hair follicle; lip; spermatocyte; morula; dentate gyrus of hippocampal formation granule cell; seminiferous tubule; right kidney; More reference expression data
BioGPS	More reference expression data
Gene ontology
Molecular function	ubiquitin-protein transferase activity; protein binding; transferase activity; metal ion binding
Cellular component	nucleus; cytoplasm; GID complex; cytosol
Biological process	proteasome-mediated ubiquitin-dependent protein catabolic process; protein ubiquitination; ubiquitin-dependent protein catabolic process
Sources:Amigo / QuickGO
Orthologs
Databases	NCBI: entry; OMA: entry
Species	Human	Mouse
Entrez	64777	66089
Ensembl	ENSG00000145916	ENSMUSG00000001054
UniProt	Q96G75	Q91YQ7
RefSeq (mRNA)	NM_001288794; NM_001288795; NM_022762	NM_025346
RefSeq (protein)	NP_001275723; NP_001275724; NP_073599	NP_079622
Location (UCSC)	Chr 5: 178.13 – 178.15 Mb	Chr 11: 51.51 – 51.53 Mb
PubMed search
- Wikidata
View/Edit Human	View/Edit Mouse

Required for meiotic nuclear division 5 homolog B (S. cerevisiae), also known as RMND5B, is a protein which in humans is encoded by the RMND5B gene. It has a zinc finger domain and is highly conserved throughout many eukaryotic organisms.

== Protein sequence ==
This protein is rich in leucine (14.0%) and might belong to the protein family of leucine-rich repeats

        1 meqcacvere ldkvlqkflt ygqhcersle ellhyvgqlr aelasaalqg tplsatlslv
       61 msqccrkikd tvqklasdhk dihssvsrvg kaidrnfdse icgvvsdavw dareqqqqil
      121 qmaivehlyq qgmlsvaeel cqestlnvdl dfkqpfleln rilealheqd lgpalewavs
      181 hrqrllelns slefklhrlh firllaggpa kqlealsyar hfqpfarlhq reiqvmmgsl
      241 vylrlgleks pychlldssh waeicetftr dacsllglsv esplsvsfas gcvalpvlmn
      301 ikavieqrqc tgvwnhkdel pieielgmkc wyhsvfacpi lrqqtsdsnp piklicghvi
      361 srdalnklin ggklkcpycp meqnpadgkr iif

== Homology ==
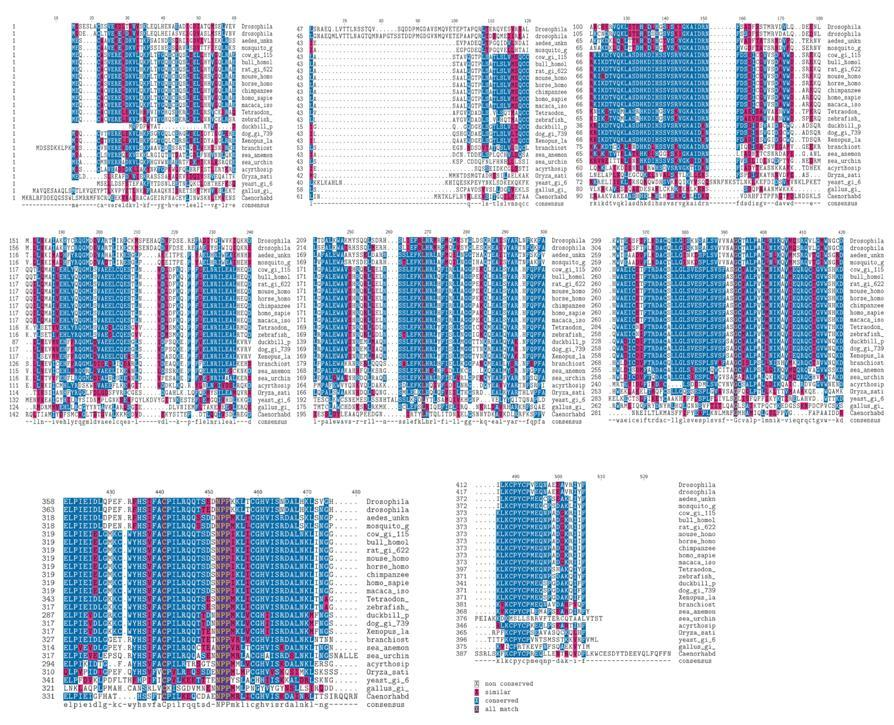
text shaded multiple sequence alignment of CAD28476; the shaded amino acids are conserved

CAD28476 is highly conserved in many eukaryotic organism. Its high conservation suggests that it plays a primary role in meiosis.

== Orthologs ==
taxonomic name	common name	NCBI entry	Percentage of sequence similarity	Length (AAs)	comments
Homo sapiens	Human		100%	393	hypothetical Protein for Meiosis
Pan troglodytes	Chimpanzee		99.7%	393	required for meiotic nuclear division 5 homolog B isoform 6
Macaca mulatta	Rhesus macaque		98.5%	393	Similar to CG3295-PA isoform 11
Rattus norvegicus	Norway rat		98.2%	393	Similar to RIKEN cDNA 0610039K22
Mus musculus	House mouse		97.7%	393	Required for meiotic nuclear division 5 homolog B
Equus caballus	Horse		97.7%	273	PREDICTED: similar required for meiotic nuclear division 5 homolog B
Bos taurus	Cattle		95.4%	393	required for meiotic nuclear division 5 homolog B
Danio rerio	Zebrafish		72.8%	391	required for meiotic nuclear division 5 homolog B
Xenopus laevis	African clawed frog		70%	391	MGC84431 protein
Canis lupus familiaris	Dog		70%	391	PREDICTED: similar to CG3295-PA isoform A
Tetraodon nigroviridis	Spotted green pufferfish		68.5%	417	unnamed protein product
Ornithorhynchus anatinus	Platypus		64.5%	389	
Branchiostoma floridae	Florida lancelet		57%	491	hypothetical protein BRAFLDRAFT_126901
Nematostella vectensis	Sea anemone		50.1%	389	
Culex quinquefasciatus	Southern house mosquito		48.5%	392	conserved hypothetical protein
Aedes aegypti	Yellow fever mosquito		48.2%	392	hypothetical protein AaeL_AAEL009407
Strongylocentrotus purpuratus	Purple urchin		48.2	405	PREDICTED: Similar to MGC88921 protein
Drosophila virilis	Fruit fly		41.5%	437	GJ20343
Drosophila melanogaster	Fruit fly		40.3%	431	CG3295
Acyrthosiphon pisum	Acrythosiphon		39.5%	366	PREDICTED: required for meiothic nuclear division 5 homolg A
Oryza sativa	Rice		32.2%	386	membrane protein-like

== Zinc finger domain ==
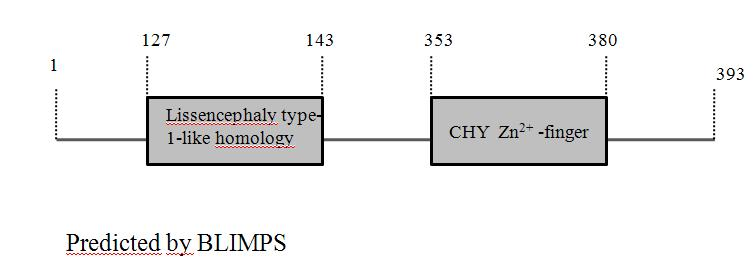
This depiction shows the location of the two predicted protein domains.

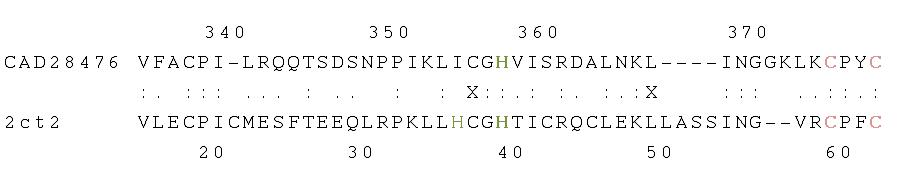
Result of local sequence alignment- the amino acids found in the zinc finger domain are highlighted in different color

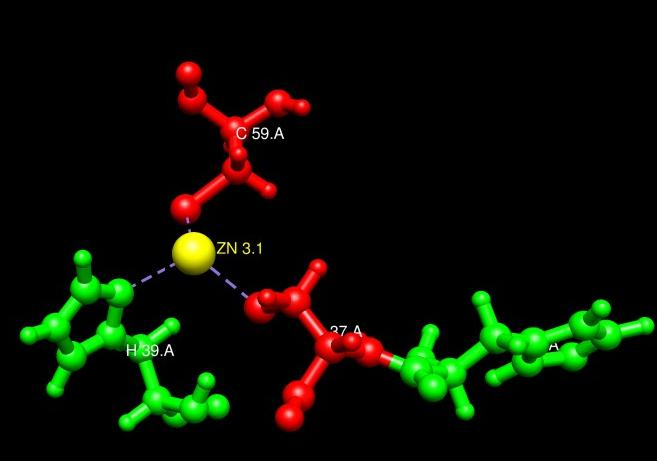
The three amino acids which are coordinated to the zinc ion.

Two domains were predicted by the program BLIMPS to exist in the protein of which one of the domains contains a zinc finger domain.

Zinc finger domains assist the binding of the protein to nucleic acids. This points to a direct interaction of CAD28476 with DNA during meiosis. By comparing CAD28476 with a related zinc finger protein in a local sequence alignment using LALIGN, the amino acids His359, Cys381 and Cys384 could be attributed to the zinc finger domain. This zinc finger structure is uncommon in the way that it involves one histidine instead of two.

== Expression ==
Microarray data show that CAD28476 is highly expressed in tissue where meiosis occurs like in testis and ovaries. Moreover, it is also highly expressed in the brain around the hypothalamus.

== Transcriptional regulation ==
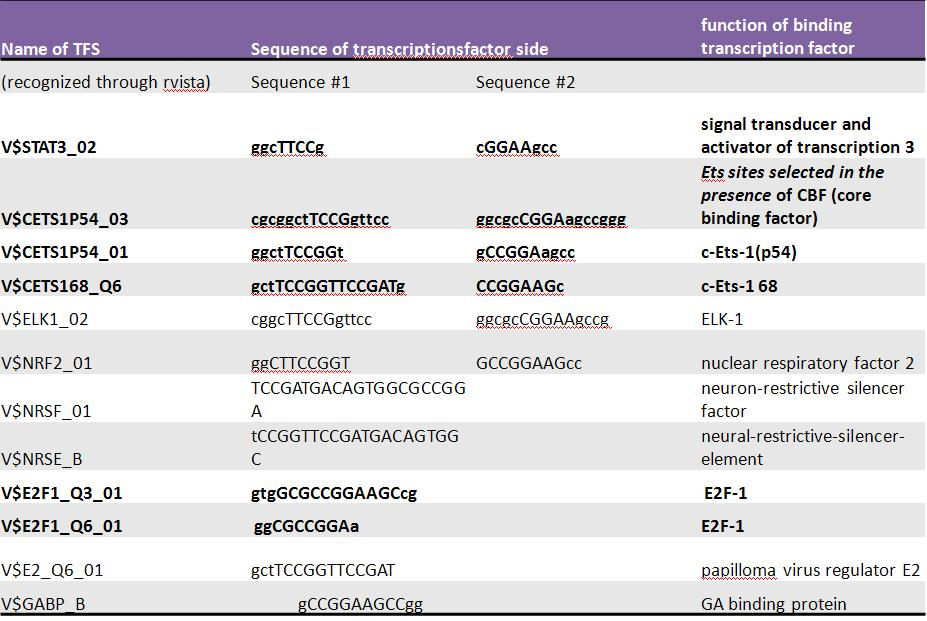
Listed binding sites for different transcription factors, the bold transcription factors are very likely to be involved in regulation.

The analysis of the promoter region (tools on the page rVista . were used) shows that there are several transcription factor binding sites localized in conserved regions . It is very likely that the transcription factor Ets-1 which belongs to the ETS transcription factor family and its core binding factor CBF are involved in regulation of transcription since they both have independent binding sites.

== Interacting proteins ==
There were two proteins predicted which interact with CAD28476.

name of the protein	Uniprot entry	information about the gene
Ewing sarcoma breakpoint region 1, isoform CRA_a		gene encodes a putative RNA binding protein. Mutations in this gene, specifically a t(11;22)(q24;q12) translocation, are known to cause Ewing sarcoma as well as neuroectodermal and various other tumors.
Mothers against decapentaplegic homolog 4		SMAD4
