= Jan Schouten (geneticist) =

Dutch scientist, entrepreneur and philanthropist

Johannes Petrus Schouten (born 17 May 1956, in Schoorl) is a Dutch scientist, entrepreneur and philanthropist. He is the inventor of Multiplex-Ligation-dependent Probe Amplification (MLPA), a method for the research of genetic disorders. He founded the biotech company MRC Holland, based in Amsterdam and the MRC Holland Foundation.

== Early life and education ==
Schouten was born in Schoorl Noord-Holland. He studied cell biology at Wageningen University. After earning his PhD he became an entrepreneur.

== Career ==
In 1985 he founded the company MRC Holland, which was based in the buildings of the Vrije Universiteit in Amsterdam. The company first focused on the production of restriction enzymes. In 2002, Schouten invented MLPA, a method for genetic testing. The method detects copy number variation in genes or parts of genes, an important cause for hereditary disorders or the development of tumours. The method is considered simple, reliable and relatively cheap, and therefore a popular choice in laboratories worldwide, including in developing countries.

In 2019, Schouten was awarded for his work with the Order of the Lion of the Netherlands, a royal distinction that recognizes merit in art and science.

== Publications ==
His most cited papers are

- Schouten JP, McElgunn CJ, Waaijer R, Zwijnenburg D,, Diepvens F, Pals G. Relative quantification of 40 nucleic acid sequences by multiplex ligation-dependent probe amplification. Nucleic Acids Research. 2002 Jun 15;30(12):e57 According to Google Scholar, it has been cited 3081 times.
- Nygren AO, Ameziane N, Duarte HM, Vijzelaar RN, Waisfisz Q, Hess CJ, Schouten JP, Errami A. Methylation-specific MLPA (MS-MLPA): simultaneous detection of CpG methylation and copy number changes of up to 40 sequences. Nucleic Acids Research. 2005;33(14):e128. According to Google Scholar, this article has been cited 451 times
- Hogervorst FB, Nederlof PM, Gille JJ, McElgunn CJ, Grippeling M, Pruntel R, Regnerus R, van Welsem T, van Spaendonk R, Menko FH, Kluijt I. Large genomic deletions and duplications in the BRCA1 gene identified by a novel quantitative method. Cancer research. 2003 Apr 1;63(7):1449-53.According to Google Scholar, this article has been cited 377 times
- Eldering E, Spek CA, Aberson HL, Grummels A, Derks IA, de Vos AF, McElgunn CJ, Schouten JP. Expression profiling via novel multiplex assay allows rapid assessment of gene regulation in defined signalling pathways. Nucleic Acids Research. 2003 Dec 1;31(23):e153. According to Google Scholar, this article has been cited 233 times

== Philanthropy ==
In 2011, Schouten and his wife started the MRC Holland Foundation whose mission is to improve educational facilities in The Gambia and as such they work closely with the country's Ministry of Education.
