= Variant of uncertain significance =

Genetic variant of unknown significance

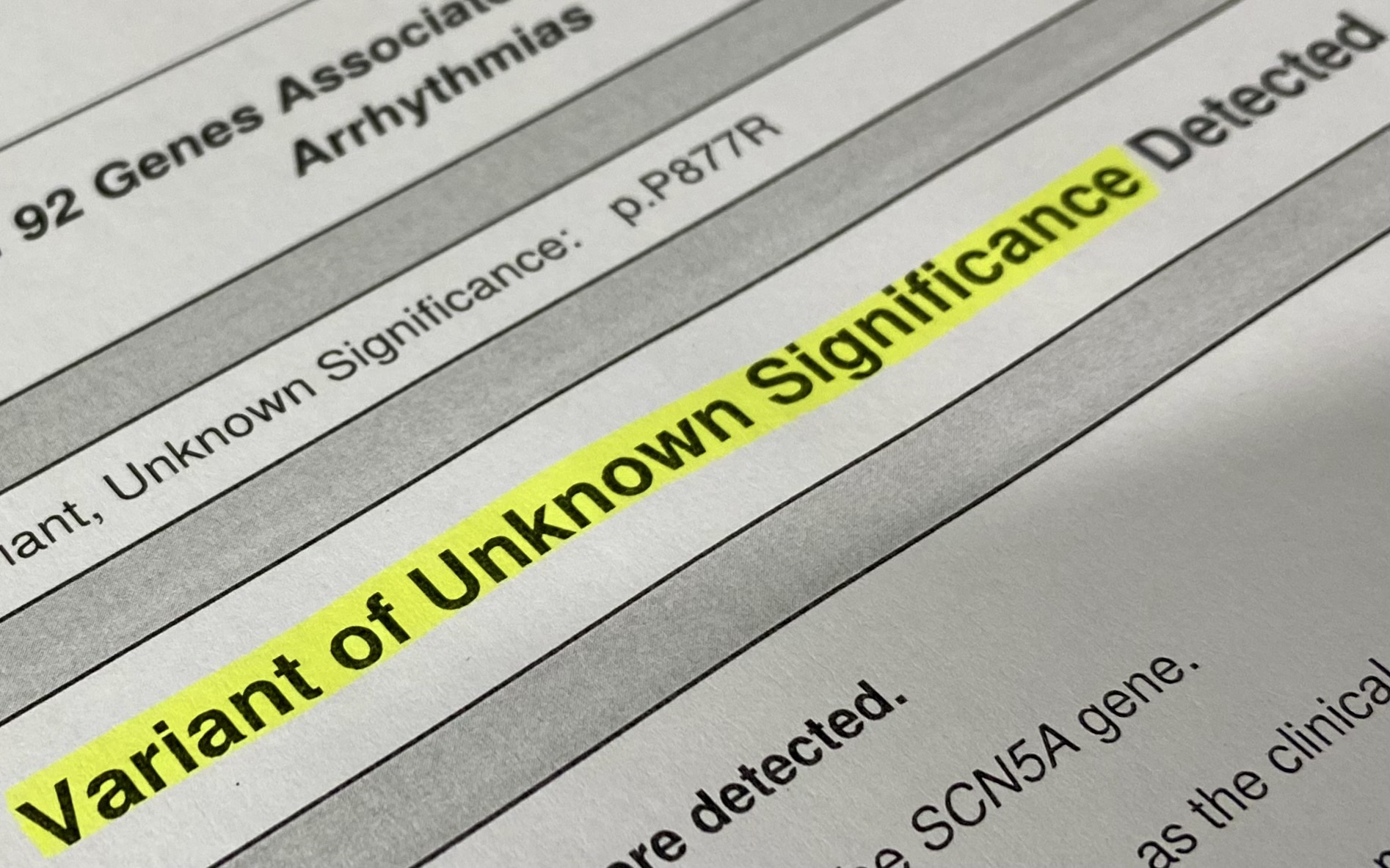
A VUS is a common result in genetic testing

A variant of uncertain (or unknown) significance (VUS) is a genetic variant that has been identified through genetic testing but whose significance to the function or health of an organism is not known. Two related terms are "gene of uncertain significance" (GUS), which refers to a gene that has been identified through genome sequencing but whose connection to a human disease has not been established, and "insignificant mutation", referring to a gene variant that has no impact on the health or function of an organism. The term "variant' is favored in clinical practice over "mutation" because it can be used to describe an allele more precisely (i.e. without inherently connoting pathogenicity). When the variant has no impact on health, it is called a "benign variant". When it is associated with a disease, it is called a "pathogenic variant". A "pharmacogenomic variant" has an effect only when an individual takes a particular drug and therefore is neither benign nor pathogenic.

A VUS is most commonly encountered by people when they get the results of a lab test looking for a mutation in a particular gene. A 2016 study of genes commonly associated with hereditary breast and ovarian cancers; ATM, BRCA1, BRCA2, CDH1, CHEK2, PALB2 and TP53, found 15,311 DNA sequence variants in only 102 patients. Many of those 15,311 variants have no significant effect on the growth or health of the person in which they were found.

Identifying variants that are significant or likely to be significant is a difficult task that may require expert human and in silico analysis, laboratory experiments and even information theory. In spite of those efforts, many people may be worried about their particular VUS, even though it has not been determined to be significant or likely to be significant. Most discovered VUSs will not be investigated in a peer-reviewed research paper, as this effort is usually reserved for likely pathogenic variants.

== History ==
In 2001, an initial draft of the human genome was published by the International Human Genome Sequencing Consortium. With the development of next-generation sequencing, the cost of sequencing has plummeted and the number of human genomes and exomes sequenced each year is increasing dramatically. As of 2017, the cost of a quality whole genome sequence is $1,000 or less. If the ratio of approximately 20 DNA sequence variants per gene holds over the entire genome (with approximately 20,000 genes) that means that every person who elects to have their genome sequenced will be provided with almost half a million Variants of Unknown Significance. To assist people to understand the meaning of all these variants, classification is a first step.

== Classification ==
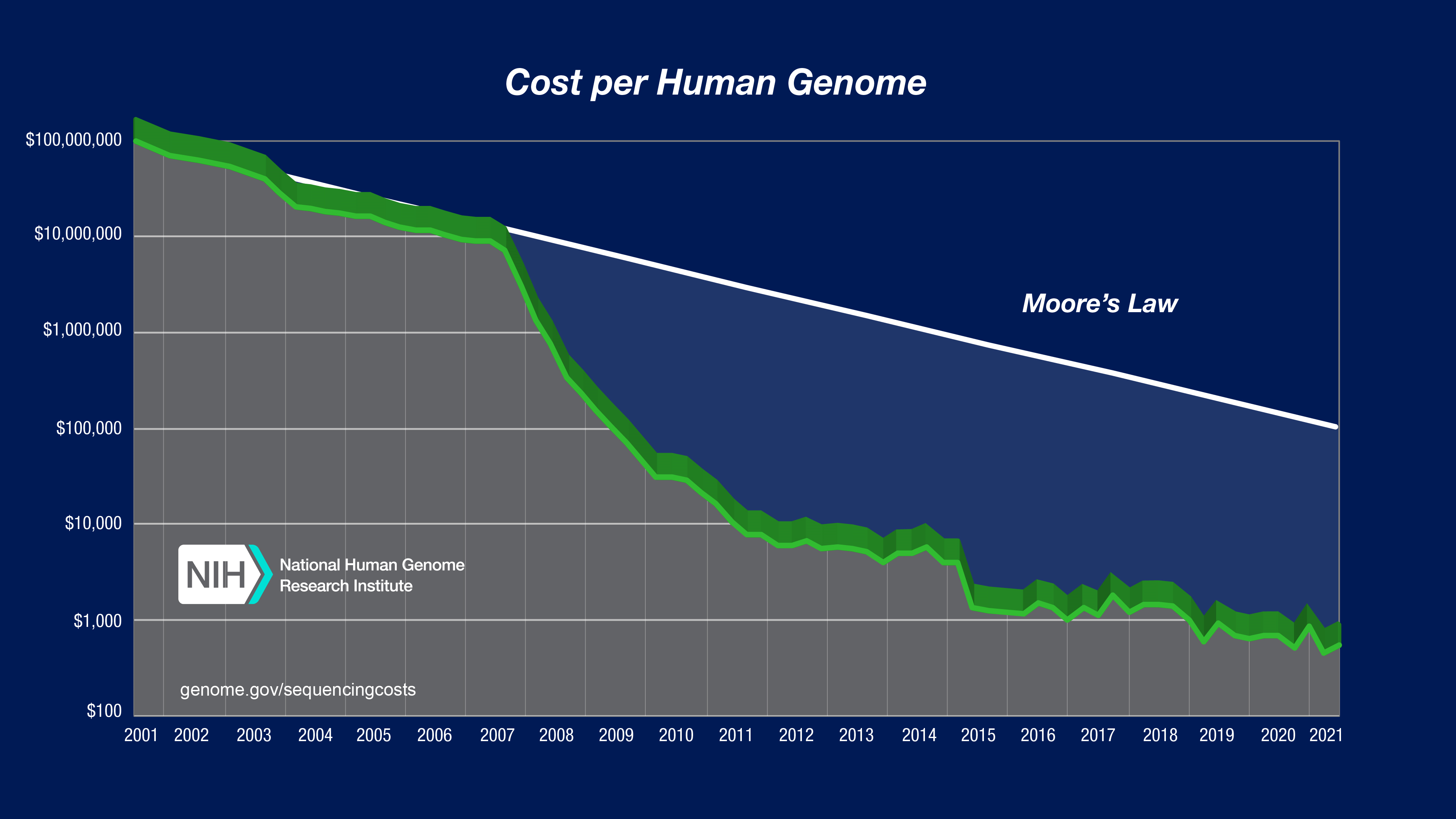
Since the Human Genome Project first sequenced the human genome in 2001 at a cost of US$100 million, costs have fallen precipitously, outpacing even Moore's law, and were ≈US$1,000 in 2015. More widely available genome sequencing has led to more available data on variants of uncertain significance.

In 2015, the American College of Medical Genetics and Genomics (ACMG), the Association for Molecular Pathology (AMP), and the College of American Pathologists (CAP) published a third revision of their guidelines on variant interpretation in Mendelian disorders. The publication recommended the following categories: pathogenic, likely pathogenic, uncertain significance, likely benign, and benign. This guideline is one of many resources published by the ACMG in hopes of improving standardization of variant interpretation and reporting.

As of 2020, there continues to be limited involvement from federal agencies to regulate the clinical validity (accuracy) and utility (risks and benefits) of genetic testing. Variant interpretation and classification is notably subjective, as laboratories developed their own criteria prior to the ACMG-AMP guidelines. This subjectiveness is further problematic when there is evidence that variant significance changes over time. Due to the lack of consistency in official guidelines, the genomics community is left struggling to efficiently categorize genetic variants.

=== Pathogenic ===
This category is reserved for variants that are well-documented to cause disease. Pathogenicity should be reported with respect to a specific condition and inheritance pattern (e.g., autosomal recessive or dominant). A pathogenic variant meets stringent criteria such as evidence from well-established functional studies or being identified in multiple unrelated individuals with the disease.

=== Likely pathogenic ===
Variants in this category show strong evidence of being disease-causing but lack definitive proof. The term "likely pathogenic" indicates that the data supports a high likelihood (greater than 90%) that the variant is pathogenic.

=== Uncertain significance ===
This category is for variants where there is unknown or conflicting clinical significance. Additional evidence is needed in order to determine whether or not the variant is causative for a particular disease. As additional data and research emerges over time, variants of unknown significance may get moved to other categories, frequently towards the benign or likely benign categories.

=== Likely benign ===
This category is used for variants that are unlikely to be causative of disease, typically supported by population frequency data or functional studies suggesting no deleterious impact. A "likely benign" classification implies more than 90% certainty that the variant is not causative for a disease.

=== Benign ===
This category is for variants that are not disease-causing. These variants are usually observed at high frequencies in population databases and have strong evidence against a pathogenic effect, including predictive computational models and experimental data showing no effect on the encoded protein.

== Limitations of the classifications ==
Less than 5% of the human genome encodes proteins, and the rest is associated with non-coding RNA molecules, regulatory DNA sequences, LINEs, SINEs, introns, and sequences for which as yet no function has been determined. Thus, only a small fraction of the almost half-million VUS's that are expected to be identified by whole genome sequencing can be categorized into the 5 categories above, leaving the patient nearly as uninformed about their variants as they would have been without this information.

Most of the base sequences regulating gene expression are found outside of protein-coding sequences, either within introns or outside of genes in intergenic regions. Changes in those regulatory regions can lead to dysfunction of a gene(s) and produce phenotypic effects that can be relevant to health and function.

An example of a variant in an intergenic enhancer is one that is associated with blond hair color in northern Europeans. The variant in an enhancer of the KITLG gene causes only a 20% change in gene expression, yet causes hair lightening.

An example of an intronic VUS controlling gene expression is the SNP found in an intron of the FTO gene. The FTO gene encodes the fat mass and obesity-associated protein, and the SNP (or VUS) found in its intron was shown by genome-wide association studies to be associated with an increased risk for obesity and diabetes. The initial assumption was that this mutation was misregulating FTO to cause the disease risk. However, it was later shown that the intronic variant was in fact regulating the distant IRX3 gene and not the FTO gene. That is just one example of how difficult it can be to determine the significance of a VUS even when many research labs are focused on it, and it illustrates that clinicians cannot reliably interpret genetic results that have not been fully clarified by prior research.

== Issues ==
Because reference genomes are overwhelmingly built from European genomes, VUS frequencies are usually higher for non-European people compared to European people. Patients report feelings of confusion and distress after receiving VUS results. Additionally, healthcare workers find it difficult to communicate VUS results, and clients generally have difficulty understanding the implications of a VUS, especially if their literacy levels are low.

In a 2009 US study of over 200 women who received BRCA VUS reports and were surveyed for one year thereafter, distress over the result persisted for the year.

A 2012 survey of patient outcomes in the Netherlands found that, after genetic counseling for BRCA VUS, patients perceived themselves to have different cancer risks than what had been explained to them by genetic counselors, and that this misperception influenced decisions about radical medical procedures.

In a 2015 study in the UK, where BRCA VUSs occur in 10-20% of tests, 39% of breast cancer specialists taking part in the study did not know how to explain a VUS report to a patient with no family history, and 71% were unsure about the clinical implications of the test reports.
