= Pitt–Hopkins syndrome =

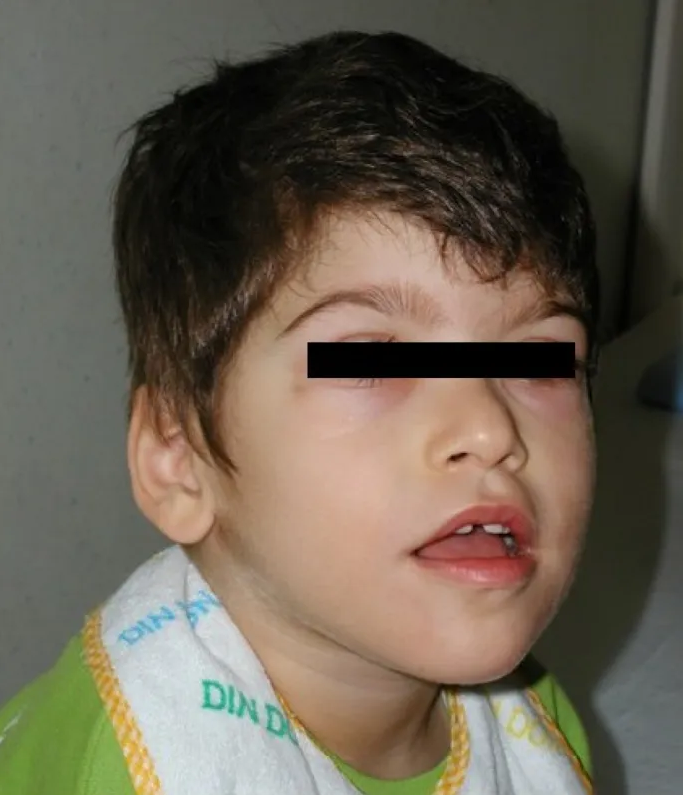
- Boy with Pitt–Hopkins syndrome showing the characteristic facial features.
- Specialty: Psychiatry, Medical genetics
- Frequency: 1 in 31,000 to 1 in 41,000 people

Pitt–Hopkins syndrome (PTHS) is a rare genetic disorder characterized by developmental delay, moderate to severe intellectual disability, distinctive facial features, and possible intermittent hyperventilation followed by apnea. Epilepsy (recurrent seizures) often occurs in Pitt-Hopkins. It is part of the clinical spectrum of Rett-like syndromes. Pitt-Hopkins syndrome is clinically similar to Angelman syndrome, Rett syndrome, Mowat–Wilson syndrome, and ATR-X syndrome.

As more is learned about Pitt–Hopkins, the developmental spectrum of the disorder is widening, and can also include difficulties with anxiety, autism, ADHD, and sensory disorders. It is associated with an abnormality within chromosome 18 that causes insufficient expression of the TCF4 gene. Those with PTHS have reported high rates of self-injury and aggressive behaviors usually related to autism and their sensory disorders.

PTHS has traditionally been associated with severe cognitive impairment, however true intelligence is difficult to measure given motor and speech difficulties. Thanks to augmentative communication and more progressive therapies, many individuals can achieve much more than initially thought. It has become clearer that there is a wider range of cognitive abilities in Pitt–Hopkins than reported in much of the scientific literature. No cure is known for Pitt-Hopkins syndrome, but it is possible to treat associated symptoms. Researchers have developed cell and rodent models to test therapies for Pitt–Hopkins.

PTHS is estimated to occur in 1:31,000 to 1:41,000 people.

== Signs and symptoms ==
PTHS can be seen as early as childhood.

The earliest signs in infants is the lower face and the high nasal root.

The facial features are characteristic and include:

- Broad nasal bridge with bulbous tip
- Wide mouth
- Cupid's bow philtrum
- Prominent ears
- Thin eyebrows

Flat feet, overriding toes, and fetal pads are also common. Short stature and scoliosis occur frequently.

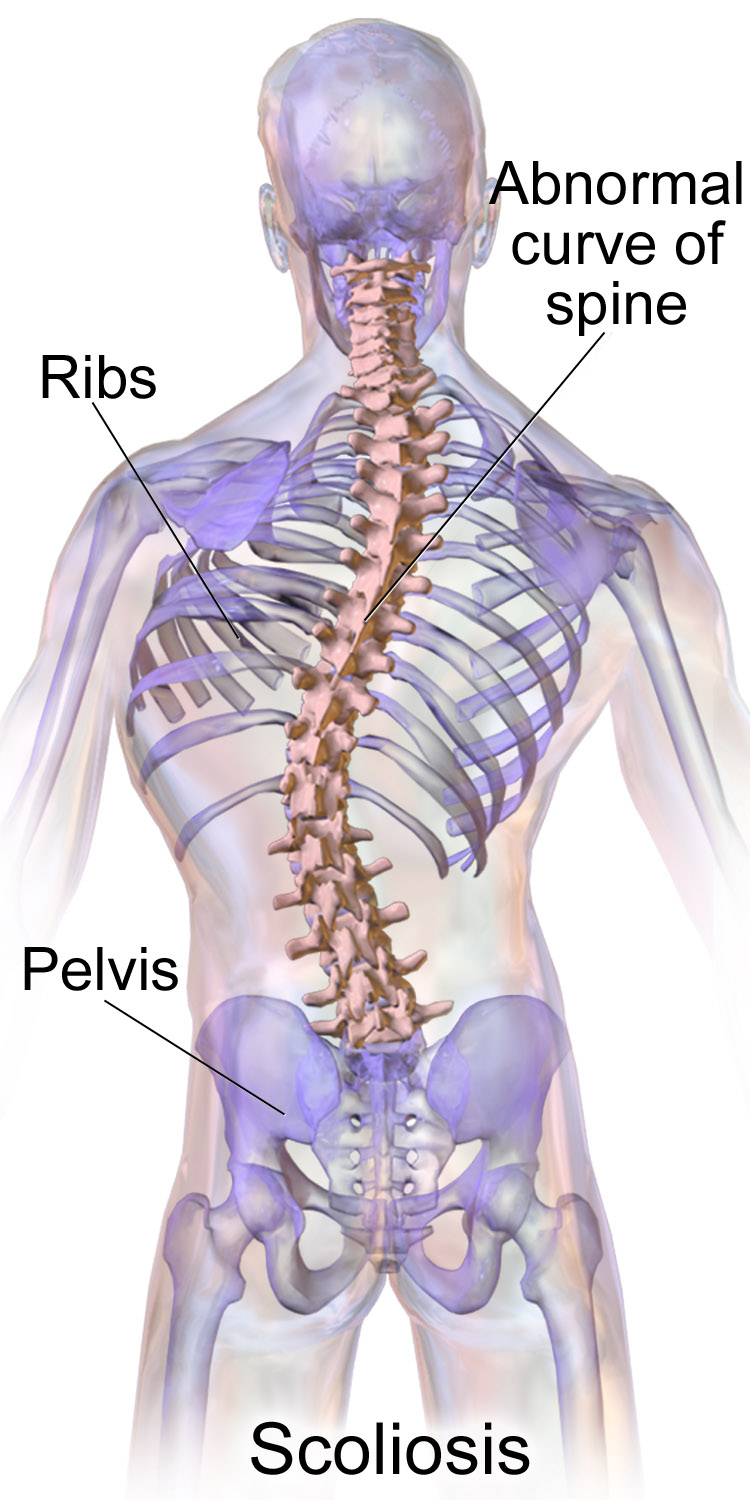

Other features of Pitt-Hopkins syndrome may include constipation and other gastrointestinal problems, microcephaly, nearsightedness, strabismus, and minor brain abnormalities

Adults who have PTHS may have trouble with their speech. Craniofacial features, which are important when diagnosing PTHS, become more visible as the person gets older.

Children with Pitt-Hopkins syndrome typically have a happy, excitable demeanor with frequent smiling, laughter, and hand-flapping movements. However, they can also experience anxiety and behavioral problems.

=== Gastrointestinal ===
Gastrointestinal difficulties are common in individuals with Pitt-Hopkins and can include constipation, reflux, and burping. Severe constipation often occurs over the entire lifespan. Breathing issues may cause air swallowing and associated pain. Low muscle tone can cause feeding issues at an early age. Some may use feeding tubes as a way to get nutrients.

=== Neurological ===
Epilepsy is not uncommon in Pitt-Hopkins and is reported in 37%-50% of cases. The onset of seizures can occur in infants or throughout adulthood. A variety of seizures can occur. Electroencephalographic (EEG) patterns can be typical or atypical, depending on the individual.

Magnetic resonance imaging (MRI) reveals that deviations in the brain may occur in individuals with Pitt-Hopkins. These can include a small corpus callosum, wide ventricles, and deviations in the posterior fossa. Many individuals with Pitt Hopkins can also have typical brain structures.

Musculoskeletal

Minor hand and foot anomalies such as slender or small hands and feet, broad fingertips, clinodactyly, tapered fingers, transverse palmar crease, flat feet with hindfoot valgus deformity, overriding toes, and short metatarsals have been reported. Absent flexion creases of the thumbs may occur with thumb ankylosis. In one individual an absent thumb tendon was found during surgery [Authors, personal observation].

== Genetics ==
The genetic cause of this disorder was described in 2007. This disorder is due to a haploinsufficiency of the transcription factor 4 (TCF4) gene which is located on the long arm of chromosome 18 (18q21.2) The mutational spectrum appears to be 40% point mutations, 30% small deletions/insertions and 30% deletions. All appear to be de novo mutations. The risk in siblings is low, but higher than the general population due to parental germline mosaicism.

A Pitt–Hopkins-like 1 phenotype has been assigned to autosomal recessive mutations of the contactin associated protein like 2 (CNTNAP2) gene on the long arm of chromosome 7 (7q33-q36) and a Pitt-Hopkines-like 2 phenotype has been assigned to autosaml recessive mutations of the neurexin 1 alpha (NRXN1) gene on the short arm of chromosome 2 (2p16.3). Pitt-Hopkins-like 1 is ultra-rare, with an estimated prevalence of less than 1 in a million.

Malformations in the CNS can be seen in about 60 to 70% of patients on MRI scans.

Pitt–Hopkins patients with a TCF4 deletion can lack the syndrome's characteristic facial features.

== Diagnosis ==
There is not a certain diagnostic criteria, but there are a few symptoms that support a diagnosis of PTHS. Some examples are: facial dysmorphism, early onset global developmental delay, moderate to severe intellectual disability, breathing abnormalities, and a lack of other major congenital abnormalities.

Zollino and colleagues defined diagnostic criteria based on characteristic features found in 75% of cases genetically confirmed for PTHS, termed cardinal features. If a person shows 9 cardinal features, they are classified as having PTHS.

It is possible that a phenotype resembling PTHS can occur without the mutation in the TCF4 gene. Mutations in the TCF4 gene do not always result in stereotypical Pitt-Hopkins syndrome.

Half of the individuals with PTHS are reported to have seizures, starting from childhood to the late teens.

Around 50% of those affected show abnormalities on brain imaging. These include a hypoplastic corpus callosum with a missing rostrum and posterior part of the splenium, with bulbous caudate nuclei bulging towards the frontal horns.

Electroencephalograms show an excess of slow components.

According to the clinical diagnosis. PTHS is in the same group as Pervasive Developmental Disorders.

When a patient is suspected of having PTHS, genetic tests looking at the TCF4 gene are typically done. Some argue for a genetic test to occur first, followed by a clinical assessment.

=== Differential diagnosis ===
PTHS is symptomatically similar to Angelman syndrome, Rett syndrome, Skraban–Deardorff syndrome, and Mowat–Wilson syndrome.

Angelman syndrome most closely resembles PTHS. Both have absent speech and a "happy" disposition. Of the differentials, Rett syndrome is the least close to PTHS. This syndrome is seen as a progressive encephalopathy. Both Angelman syndrome and Rett syndrome lack the distinctive facial features of PTHS. Mowat–Wilson syndrome is seen in early infancy and is characterized by distinctive facial abnormalities.

== Treatment ==
There is no specific treatment for this condition. It is based on symptomatology. Since there is a lack of treatment, people with PTHS use behavioral and training approaches. Comorbidities may also be treated.

Care from a medical team including neurologists, ophthalmologists, pulmonologists, and gastroenterologists may be utilized.

Recommendations for developmental delay and intellectual disability in the U.S. (may differ depending on country):

- Early intervention program from newborn to age 3 will allow access to different therapies (occupational, physical, speech, and feeding).
- Developmental preschool through public school systems from ages 3 to 5. The child will need an evaluation before getting into the program, to see what kind of therapy is needed.
- From the ages 5–21 the child's school may create an IEP (based on the child's functions and needs). Children are encouraged to stay in school until at least the age of 21.

== History ==
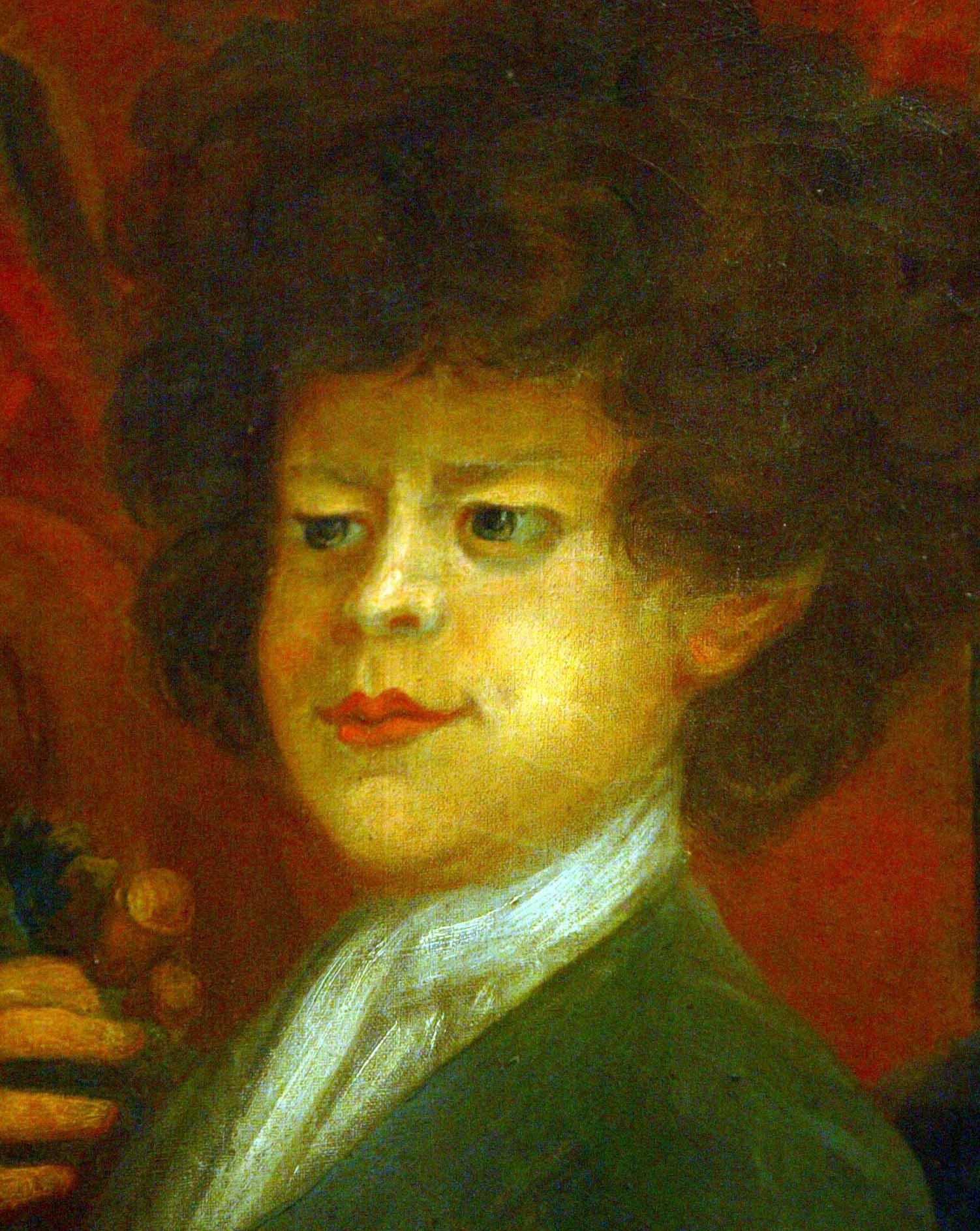
Peter the Wild Boy (c. 1713 – 1785) showing some of the physical traits of Pitt–Hopkins syndrome, including coarse, curly hair, drooping eyelids and large, thick-lipped mouth

The condition was first described in 1978, by D. Pitt and I. Hopkins (The Children's Cottages Training Centre, Kew and Royal Children's Hospital, Melbourne, Australia) in two unrelated patients.
