= Multiplex ligation-dependent probe amplification =

Biochemistry detection method

Multiplex ligation-dependent probe amplification (MLPA) is a variation of the multiplex polymerase chain reaction that permits amplification of multiple targets with only a single primer pair. It detects copy number changes at the molecular level, and software programs are used for analysis. Identification of deletions or duplications can indicate pathogenic mutations, thus MLPA is an important diagnostic tool used in clinical pathology laboratories worldwide.

== History ==
Multiplex ligation-dependent probe amplification was invented by Jan Schouten, a Dutch scientist. The method was first described in 2002 in the scientific journal Nucleic Acid Research. The first applications included the detection of exon deletions in the human genes BRCA1, MSH2 and MLH1, which are linked to hereditary breast and colon cancer. Now MLPA is used to detect hundreds of hereditary disorders, as well as for tumour profiling.

== Description ==
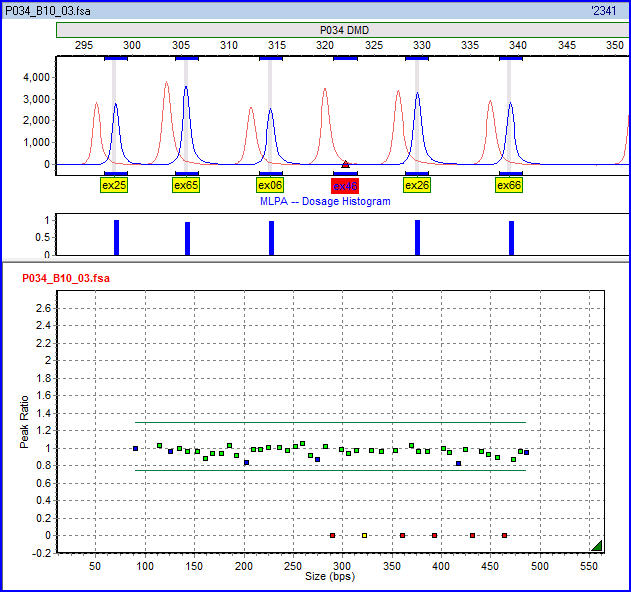
Example of exon deletions detected by Multiplex ligation-dependent probe amplification in a Duchenne muscular dystrophy patient

MLPA quantifies the presence of particular sequences in a sample of DNA, using a specially designed probe pair for each target sequence of interest. The process consists of multiple steps:

1. The sample DNA is denatured, resulting in single-stranded sample DNA.
2. Pairs of probes are hybridized to the sample DNA, with each probe pair designed to query for the presence of a particular DNA sequence.
3. Ligase is applied to the hybridized DNA, combining probe pairs that are hybridized immediately next to each other into a single strand of DNA that can be amplified by PCR.
4. PCR amplifies all probe pairs that have been successfully ligated, using fluorescently labeled PCR primers.
5. The PCR products are quantified, typically by (capillary) electrophoresis.

Each probe pair consists of two oligonucleotides, with sequence that recognizes adjacent sites of the target DNA, a PCR priming site, and optionally a "stuffer" to give the PCR product a unique length when compared to other probe pairs in the MLPA assay. Each complete probe pair must have a unique length, so that its resulting amplicons can be uniquely identified during quantification, avoiding the resolution limitations of multiplex PCR. Because the forward primer used for probe amplification is fluorescently labeled, each amplicon generates a fluorescent peak which can be detected by a capillary sequencer. Comparing the peak pattern obtained on a given sample with that obtained on various reference samples, the relative quantity of each amplicon can be determined. This ratio is a measure for the ratio in which the target sequence is present in the sample DNA.

Various techniques including DGGE (Denaturing Gradient Gel Electrophoresis), DHPLC (Denaturing High Performance Liquid Chromatography), and SSCA (Single Strand Conformation Analysis) effectively identify SNPs and small insertions and deletions. MLPA, however, is one of the only accurate, time-efficient techniques to detect genomic deletions and insertions (one or more entire exons), which are frequent causes of cancers such as hereditary non-polyposis colorectal cancer (HNPCC), breast, and ovarian cancer. MLPA can successfully and easily determine the relative copy number of all exons within a gene simultaneously with high sensitivity.

== Relative ploidy ==
An important use of MLPA is to determine relative ploidy. For example, probes may be designed to target various regions of chromosome 21 of a human cell. The signal strengths of the probes are compared with those obtained from a reference DNA sample known to have two copies of the chromosome. If an extra copy is present in the test sample, the signals are expected to be 1.5 times the intensities of the respective probes from the reference. If only one copy is present the proportion is expected to be 0.5. If the sample has two copies, the relative probe strengths are expected to be equal.

== Dosage quotient analysis ==
Dosage quotient analysis is the usual method of interpreting MLPA data. If a and b are the signals from two amplicons in the patient sample, and A and B are the corresponding amplicons in the experimental control, then the dosage quotient DQ = (a/b) / (A/B). Although dosage quotients may be calculated for any pair of amplicons, it is usually the case that one of the pair is an internal reference probe.

== Applications ==
MLPA facilitates the amplification and detection of multiple targets with a single primer pair. In a standard multiplex PCR reaction, each fragment needs a unique amplifying primer pair. These primers being present in a large quantity result in various problems such as dimerization and false priming. With MLPA, amplification of probes can be achieved. Thus, many sequences (up to 40) can be amplified and quantified using just a single primer pair. MLPA reaction is fast, inexpensive and very simple to perform.

MLPA has a variety of applications including detection of mutations and single nucleotide polymorphisms, analysis of DNA methylation, relative mRNA quantification, chromosomal characterisation of cell lines and tissue samples, detection of gene copy number, detection of duplications and deletions in human cancer predisposition genes such as BRCA1, BRCA2, hMLH1 and hMSH2 and aneuploidy determination. MLPA has potential application in prenatal diagnosis both invasive and noninvasive.

Recent studies have shown that MLPA (as well as another variants such as iMLPA) is a robust technique for inversion characterisation.

== Variants ==
=== MS-MLPA ===
Methylation-specific MLPA (MS-MLPA) combines standard MLPA with methylation-sensitive restriction digestion so that the same assay can assess targeted copy number and CpG methylation. It has clinical use in imprinting and methylation disorders such as Prader-Willi syndrome and Angelman syndrome.

=== iMLPA ===
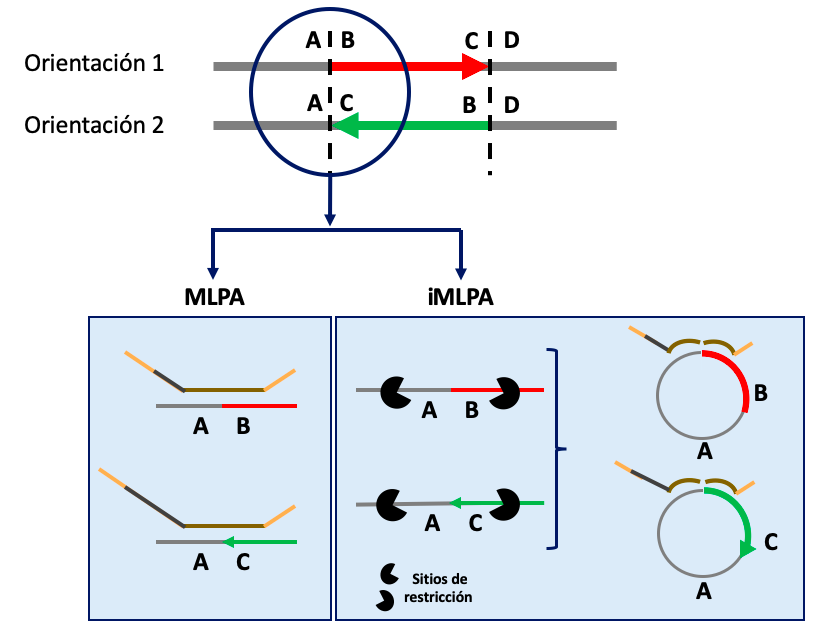
Differences between MLPA and iMLPA

Giner-Delgado, Carla, et al. described a variant of MLPA combining it with iPCR. They call these new method iMLPA and its procedure is the same as MLPA but there are necessary two additional steps at the beginning:

1. First, a DNA treatment with restriction enzymes that cut on both sides of the region of interest is necessary.
2. The fragments obtained from digestion are recircularized and linked

The probe design is quite similar. Each probe will be formed by two parts that have at least: a target sequence, which is a region that contains the sequence complementary to the region of interest, so that the correct hybridization can occur. And a primer sequence at the end, it is a sequence whose design varies and is what will allow the design of primers and subsequent fragment amplification. In addition, one of the parts of the probe usually contains a stuffer between the target sequence and the primer sequence. The use of different stuffers allows the identification of probes with the same primer sequences but different target sequences, that is key for multiple amplification of several different fragments in a single reaction.

The next step continues with the typical MLPA protocol.
