= Illana Gozes =

Israeli scientist

- אילנה גוזס
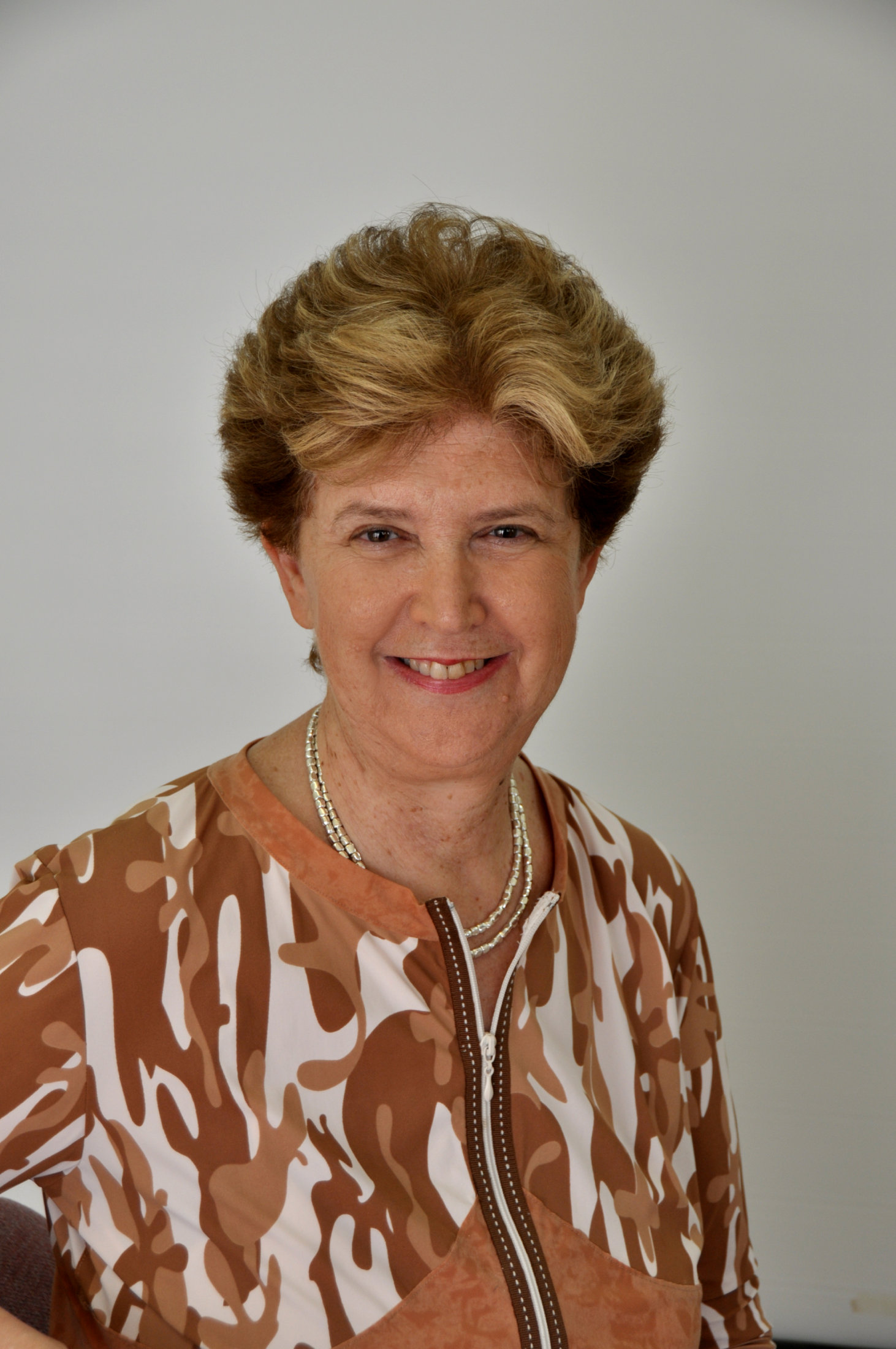
- Born: March 1, 1949 (age 77); Jerusalem, Israel
- Education: Tel Aviv University (B.Sc., 1973); Weizmann Institute of Science (PhD, 1978)
- Occupations: Biochemist, Neurobiologist
- Employers: Tel Aviv University 1990-; National Institutes of Health, US 1989-1990; Weizmann Institute of Science 1982-1989; Biotech and Pharma Consulting (Selected): Exonavis Therapeutics Ltd. 2023-; ATED Therapeutics Inc. 2022-2023; Coronis Neurosciences Ltd. 2014-2020; Allon Therapeutics Inc. 2001-2013; Fujimoto Pharmaceutical Corp. 1987-1997
- Known for: Finding a cure for autism, Alzheimer's disease, and schizophrenia

Illana Gozes (Hebrew: אילנה גוזס; born March 1, 1949) is an Israeli scientist whose research focuses on the molecular structure and function of the brain, with an emphasis on finding biological markers and developing therapeutics against autism, Alzheimer's disease and related disorders, as well schizophrenia. She is a Full Professor (Emerita) of Clinical Biochemistry, former incumbent of the Lilly and Avraham Gildor Chair for the Investigation of Growth Factors, Director of the Elton Laboratory for Molecular Neuroendocrinology, a member of the Department of Human Molecular Genetics and Biochemistry at the Gray Faculty of Medical and Health Sciences, and Sagol School of Neuroscience at Tel Aviv University.

Professor Gozes is the Editor-in-Chief of the scientific journal "Journal of Molecular Neuroscience" which deals with the study of the nervous system, and previously served as head of The Adams Super Center for Brain Studies at Tel Aviv University (2006-2014) and as President of the Israel Society for Neuroscience (2008-2010). In 2016, she was appointed by Education Minister Naftali Bennett to the Council for Higher Education (until 2022). In 2023, she was appointed President of the European Society for Neurochemistry (until 2025). She also serves as the President of the Summer Neuropeptide Conference.

== Biography ==
Illana Gozes was born in Jerusalem to Yitzhak and Esther Allon (a descendant of Nachman Nathan Coronel, a Rabbi and a Scholar/Writer, returned to Israel 1830, and Aharon of Karlin). In 1973, Professor Gozes received a bachelor's degree in Life Sciences from Tel Aviv University. She completed her direct doctorate in Neurobiology in 1978 at the Weizmann Institute of Science, under the supervision of Prof. Uriel Littauer and her postdoctoral Weizmann fellowship in 1980 at Massachusetts Institute of Technology, with Prof. Michael Moskowitz (Laboratory Director, Professor Richard Wurtman).

Furthermore, she was a visiting scientist at the Salk and Scripps Research Institutes in San Diego, California until 1982. From 1982 she served at the Weizmann Institute of Science as a Senior Scientist and then as an Associate Professor. After 7 years she was invited to a sabbatical at the US National Institutes of Health in Maryland. In 1990 she joined the Faculty of Medicine of Tel Aviv University, and in 1993 she was appointed as a Full Professor of Clinical Biochemistry. Professor Gozes served as Head of the Department of Pathological Chemistry-Clinical Biochemistry from 1993 to 1995. She serves on numerous national and international committees, primarily dealing with brain research, protein hormones, and Alzheimer's disease (member of the Scientific Council of EMDA, the Alzheimer's Association of Israel). Professor Gozes mentored about 100 students at all graduate research levels including, for example amongst those who chose an academic careers reaching professorships are, Professor Albert Pinhasov, Professor Osnat Ashur-Fabian, Professor Haim Bassan, and Professor Roy Alcalay.

== Research ==
=== Early Research Discoveries ===
As a young student and a post-doctoral fellow, Professor Gozes discovered brain specific protein expression critical for functional connectivity. As a young independent scientist, Professor Gozes was amongst the pioneers of brain gene cloning and genetic engineering: from genes to behavior. Advancing in her scientific career, she developed innovative short and "fatty" proteins allowing understanding of basic brain maturation and function toward drug discovery.

=== Research on the ADNP protein ===
Professor Gozes’s laboratory discovered activity-dependent neuroprotective protein (ADNP) and found that it is essential for brain formation and protects neurons that stop transmitting electrical signals. Furthermore, the lab revealed a fragment of the protein responsible for rebuilding brain cells that suffer from glucose or oxygen supply deficiency.

=== Drug development against Alzheimer's disease, Progressive Supranuclear Palsy (PSP) and schizophrenia ===
A research team led by Professor Illana Gozes has discovered a way to protect brain cells damaged by Alzheimer's disease and reverse the damage caused to cells even before treatment. The research team discovered that NAP a fragment of the ADNP protein that is essential for brain formation, can protect brain cells from damage caused by dementia-related diseases and schizophrenia. NAP has been developed into an experimental drug called davunetide. Professor Gozes's recent studies show that it protects against a central pathology in Alzheimer's disease called tauopathy. Professor Gozes further discovered that mutations in ADNP lead to tauopathy. Interestingly, women and men show differences in their cognitive abilities. In elderly suffering from memory disorders, davunetide, protecting against tauopathy, improves short-term visual memory in men and auditory memory in women. Also, in the rare disease Progressive Supranuclear Palsy (PSP), which shows a tauopathy like Alzheimer's disease, davunetide protects against disease progression in women (who appear to deteriorate faster than men). Exonavis Therapeutics Ltd (Professor Gozes, Vice President of Research and Development) is developing davunetide for PSP and similar diseases. Previously, Professor Gozes served as Chief Scientific Officer at Allon Therapeutics, Coronis Neurosciences and ATED Therapeutics.

=== Research on Autism ===
Based on Professor Gozes's many years of research, it was discovered that the gene encoding ADNP is one of the main genes, which undergoes spontaneous mutations causing autism and developmental disorders. The autistic syndrome – ADNP syndrome is being studied extensively in Professor Gozes's laboratory and Exonavis is currently planning a clinical trial in affected children.

=== Registered Patents ===
Currently, Professor Gozes boasts numerous patents registered in her name as an inventor, many of which are related to protecting nerve cells and delaying their death, to methods for diagnosing diseases that cause nerve cell destruction, and to ways to treat and prevent brain diseases.

=== Scientific Publications ===
Professor Gozes published her important findings in a variety of scientific articles (approximately 400 articles and 3 books, including Neuroprotection in Autism, Schizophrenia and Alzheimer's disease). Her articles have been cited approximately 40,000 times. In her research area of Molecular Neuroscience, she is the third leading scientist in the world by number of citations.

=== Scientific Collaborations ===
As evidenced from her numerous publications, she enjoys national and international collaborations, most recent, "Targeting Circadian Clock Dysfunction in Alzheimer’s Disease" Doctoral Network (TClock4AD), a joint doctoral program funded within Horizon Europe Marie Skłodowska-Curie Doctoral Networks that aims to train doctoral candidates thorough an international consortium of universities, research institutions, SMEs, a hospital, a patient association and other socio-economic actors from different countries across Europe and beyond”.

== Selected Awards ==
For her extensive research, Prof. Gozes has won a variety of awards, including:

- Landau Award for Outstanding Doctoral Thesis (1977)
- Bergmann Memorial Award of the US-Israel Binational Science Foundation for the Best Research Proposal in Israel for a Young Scientist (1982–1985)
- Joluden Award for Outstanding Achievement in One of Her Research Projects (1991)
- Teva Founders Award (1993)
- Fogarty-Scholar-in-Residence - US Institutes of Health (1995)
- ILMAR Outstanding Scientist Award (Israel Association for Clinical Laboratory Sciences, ISCLS) (1997)
- The Neufeld Memorial Research Award to be given to the most outstanding and original new project in health sciences (2000–2003)
- Humboldt Award (2013)
- Landau Prize for Outstanding Research in Life Sciences (2013)
- Champion of Hope Award, Outstanding International Scientist - Global Genes (2016)
- Catalyst Award for Longevity from the National Academy of Medicine, USA (together with scientists from Hong Kong) (2021)
- In 2008, she was awarded a certificate of honor as an outstanding scientist at Tel Aviv University the year before.
- In 2020, she was named an Honorary Member, Israel Society for Neuroscience, and received a Silver Medal, Bulgarian Academy of Science

== Personal life ==
Married to Yehoshua Gozes, a retiree from the Biological Research Institute in Nes Ziona. Mother of Adi Gozes-Hamenahem, married to Amir Hamenahem and Grandmother of Tom, Emma and Daniel Hamenahem.
