= Meyerstein =

Meyerstein is a surname. Notable people with the surname include:

- Dan Meyerstein (born 1938), Israeli academic and former president of Ariel University
- Edward William Meyerstein (1863–1942), British merchant, stockbroker, and philanthropist
- E. H. W. Meyerstein (1889–1952), English writer
