= American Friends of Judea and Samaria =

American non-profit organization

- Established: 2022; 4 years ago
- Type: 501(c)(3) organization
- Tax ID no.: 88-2871507
- Key people: Rafi Lazerowitz; Yigal Dilmoni
- Website: afjs.org

American Friends of Judea and Samaria (AFJS) is an American 501(c)3 non-profit organization founded in 2022 by Rafi Lazerowitz and Yigal Dilmoni to support Israeli settlements in Judea and Samaria. The group operates in the United States and Canada an as informal support arm of the Yesha Council, the Israeli settler leadership organization.

AFJS organizes tours of settlements in the occupied West Bank, including for American elected representatives and political candidates.

== History ==
As of January 2026, AFJS has launched "extensive educational and public-awareness initiatives across the United States" to support US state governments' passage of legislation recognizing Judea and Samaria, including in Oklahoma, Tennessee, South Carolina, Alabama, Florida, South Dakota, Arizona, Mississippi, New Jersey, Iowa, West Virginia and Rhode Island.

In February 2026, AFJS and Ariel University hosted the first "International Academy for Judea and Samaria," an initiative shaped at shaping discourse around the West Bank. The initiative included a 10-part webinar series titled "Beyond the Headlines: Judea and Samaria"that launched on February 22, 2026.

In April 2026, Arkansas passed a bill to refer to the West Bank as Judea and Samaria, and barring state agencies from using the term "West Bank" in official government communications and documents. In May 2026, AFJS founders Rafi Lazerowitz and Yigal Dilmoni presented Arkansas State Representative Mindy McAlindon with a certificate of appreciation and honorary membership in the AFJS.

In May 2026, AFJS hosted an event at a Golf Club in Long Island, New York to boost support for Israeli settlements in the West Bank. The event was attended by approximately 100, including Arkansas state senator Jim Dotson and state representative Mindy McAlindon, among the first two state representatives to advance legislation supporting Israeli settlement of Judea and Samaria. MK Simcha Rothman, Chairman of the Knesset's Constitution, Law and Justice Committee, was expected to attend.
