= CHAMP1-related neurodevelopmental disorder =

- Other names: CHAMP1 disorder, Autosomal dominant intellectual disability type 40 (MRD40), Neurodevelopmental disorder with hypotonia, impaired language, and dysmorphic features (NEDHILD)
- Specialty: Medical genetics, pediatrics
- Symptoms: Developmental delay, intellectual disability, severe speech impairment, hypotonia, feeding difficulties
- Usual onset: Birth
- Duration: Lifelong
- Causes: Genetic mutation or deletion in the CHAMP1 gene
- Diagnostic method: Genetic testing (e.g., WES, WGS, CMA)
- Treatment: Supportive care including physiotherapy, occupational therapy, speech therapy, and management of symptoms
- Prognosis: Variable; most individuals require lifelong support
- Frequency: Ultra-rare; fewer than 270 cases identified worldwide (as of 2026)

CHAMP1-related neurodevelopmental disorder, also called CHAMP1 disorder, is an ultra-rare genetic disorder caused by de novo pathogenic variants or deletions of the CHAMP1 gene on chromosome 13. The condition is primarily characterized by global developmental delay, varying degrees of intellectual disability, and severe speech and language impairment. Other common features include low muscle tone (hypotonia), feeding difficulties, gastrointestinal problems, behavioral differences, and distinctive facial features. The disorder was first described in 2015 and is classified as autosomal dominant, meaning a change in only one of the two copies of the gene is sufficient to cause the condition; in almost all known cases the variant has arisen spontaneously and is not inherited from a parent.

== Signs and symptoms ==
The clinical presentation is variable, and not every individual will display all features.

=== Developmental and cognitive features ===
Developmental delay is universally present. Most children achieve independent walking, though typically after the age of two; among those with intragenic ("coding") variants, the average age of first independent steps is approximately 26 months, while those with whole-gene deletions tend to reach this milestone earlier. In a 2024 study using data from the Simons Searchlight registry, 5 of the 17 individuals with the condition were not yet walking when their families were surveyed. All affected individuals have some degree of intellectual disability, ranging from mild to severe.

Severe speech and language impairment is a core feature: many individuals remain non-verbal or minimally verbal, although receptive language (understanding) is generally stronger than expressive language (speaking). Augmentative and alternative communication (AAC) methods are often essential for communication.

=== Behavioral features ===
Neurobehavioral features are prominent. In prospective assessment, approximately one-third of individuals met criteria for autism spectrum disorder and approximately 60 percent met criteria for attention deficit hyperactivity disorder (ADHD); repetitive behaviors and sensory-seeking symptoms were particularly common. Anxiety is also frequently reported. These challenges often co-exist with a characteristically happy, friendly, and sociable demeanor that parents and clinicians frequently note.

=== Physical and medical features ===
Hypotonia is present in the majority of individuals and often contributes to early feeding difficulties. A 2026 study identified a noncanonical role for CHAMP1 in skeletal muscle development: the protein acts as a cofactor for MyoD to activate expression of Myomaker, a fusogen required for myoblast fusion into multinucleated myofibers, and patient-derived cells show intrinsic fusion defects. While these defects can be fully rescued by restoring Myomaker expression, re-expression of full-length CHAMP1 only partially rescues fusion in cells that retain truncated mutant protein, supporting a dominant-negative effect in muscle tissue. Reduced expression of additional muscle structural genes was also observed, which may contribute to the broader pattern of muscle weakness. The muscle phenotype shows clinical overlap with Carey-Fineman-Ziter syndrome, which is caused by mutations in the Myomaker gene MYMK. Characteristic facial features, though sometimes subtle, may include a thin or tented upper lip, a short philtrum, a wide nasal bridge, low-set ears, and an open-mouth posture. Microcephaly is reported in a substantial proportion of individuals.

Gastrointestinal problems are common throughout life. Gastroesophageal reflux disease (GERD), chronic constipation, and recurrent vomiting episodes are frequently reported; a review has noted the overlap between these symptoms and cyclic vomiting syndrome and has linked the gastrointestinal phenotype to potential dysregulation of the brain–gut axis.

Seizures have been described in approximately one-quarter to one-third of individuals in published cohorts; in particular, refractory myoclonic epilepsy has been reported, and the rare missense variants associated with severe epileptic encephalopathy may carry a higher seizure burden than typical truncating variants. Eye and vision problems are frequent: in one cohort of 14 individuals, ophthalmologic findings were present in over 90 percent, with strabismus and hyperopia each affecting more than half and nystagmus present in approximately one-fifth. Frequent ear infections (otitis media) were also common in that cohort, affecting the majority of individuals. Sleep disturbances, structural brain anomalies such as a thin corpus callosum, and, in individual cases, skeletal features including thoracic hyperkyphosis have also been reported. Single case reports have described vesicoureteral reflux, reduced sensitivity to pain, early-onset hyperphagia, craniosynostosis and acute gastric volvulus, which the authors suggested may be linked to low muscle tone.

== Causes ==
=== Genetics ===
The disorder is caused by pathogenic variants or deletions of the CHAMP1 gene, located at chromosome 13q34. The gene encodes the CHAMP1 protein, which has roles in chromosome segregation during mitosis, DNA repair via homologous recombination, and heterochromatin assembly (see CHAMP1 for details of protein function). CHAMP1 is expressed in the developing brain, and CHAMP1-deficient mice show impaired neuronal development and a mild behavioral phenotype, linking its molecular functions to the neurodevelopmental disorder.

=== Pathomechanisms ===
Most pathogenic CHAMP1 variants are premature termination codon (PTC) variants — nonsense, frameshift, or splice site changes — and several recurrent variants (for example p.Arg398* and p.Arg497*) have been described. Because the coding sequence lies almost entirely within a single exon, PTC-bearing transcripts are predicted to escape nonsense-mediated decay (NMD), and truncated proteins of the expected sizes have been detected in patient-derived cells rather than being degraded.

A framework relating genotype to phenotype has been proposed, in which distinct classes of variant act through distinct mechanisms:

Whole-gene deletions and larger 13q34 microdeletions — which also encompass adjacent loci including CDC16 and UPF3B — reduce functional protein levels and are thought to act through haploinsufficiency; these have been associated with comparatively milder phenotypes and greater adaptive functioning. For the more common truncating variants, both a dominant-negative mechanism (in which stable truncated protein interferes with the wild-type protein or its partners) and simple haploinsufficiency have been proposed; the question remains unresolved, with clinical comparisons suggesting that truncating variants are not equivalent to simple haploinsufficiency, while functional studies of the associated homologous recombination defect have instead supported a haploinsufficient mechanism; in the muscle context, however, functional evidence from myoblast fusion assays supports a dominant-negative effect. A small number of rare missense variants (for example p.Gly23Ser) have been reported in association with severe, early-onset epileptic encephalopathy; these do not appear to impair homologous recombination and have been tentatively proposed to act through a gain-of-function mechanism, although this is based on very few cases.

== Diagnosis ==
Diagnosis is confirmed through genetic testing. Whole exome sequencing (WES) or whole genome sequencing (WGS) are used to identify sequence variants within the gene, while chromosome microarray analysis (CMA) is used to detect whole-gene or larger deletions. Microcephaly has been seen on prenatal ultrasound in at least one case. CHAMP1 variants have also been found in sequencing studies of people with autism or intellectual disability in several countries, including Turkey, Finland, Chile and the UK. As of 2026, no standardized clinical practice guidelines have been published for the disorder; management relies on supportive, multi-specialty care guided by published case series and clinical experience.

== Management ==
There is currently no cure. Management is supportive, tailored to the individual's needs, and typically involves a multidisciplinary team. This commonly includes physiotherapy to address low muscle tone and gross motor delays; occupational therapy for fine motor skills, daily living skills, and sensory sensitivities; speech and language therapy with emphasis on augmentative and alternative communication for individuals who are non-verbal; behavioral support for features of ADHD, autism, and anxiety; and medical management of associated conditions such as seizures, GERD, constipation, and vision problems.

== Epidemiology ==
CHAMP1-related neurodevelopmental disorder is considered ultra-rare. As of 2026, fewer than 270 individuals have been identified worldwide through patient registries and published medical literature. The condition was first described in 2015 when de novo mutations in CHAMP1 were identified in children with severe developmental delay as part of a large-scale study of developmental disorders, and independently by Hempel and colleagues. It is considered likely to be underdiagnosed, given that analyses of individuals with intellectual disability suggest the condition may affect as many as 1 in 500 of those with intellectual or developmental delay.

== Research ==
Research into the molecular basis of CHAMP1-related disorder is ongoing. Published studies have identified the CHAMP1–POGZ–HP1α complex as a key regulator of heterochromatin and DNA repair, and have demonstrated that cells from individuals with the disorder show defective heterochromatin clustering and reduced homologous recombination, suggesting that impaired DNA repair may contribute to the pathogenesis. A CHAMP1-deficient mouse model shows impaired neuronal development and a mild behavioral phenotype, providing a platform for preclinical investigation. The identification of Myomaker deficiency as the proximate cause of muscle fusion defects in CHAMP1-deficient cells has pointed to compensated Myomaker expression as a potential therapeutic target for the muscle component of the disorder. Separately, the CHAMP1 complex has been shown to stabilise stalled DNA replication forks by depositing H3K9me3 and shielding them from nuclease-mediated degradation; loss of the complex sensitises cells to replication stress and identifies specific cancer subtypes — including CCNE1-amplified ovarian cancers and tumours that use the alternative lengthening of telomeres pathway — as candidate therapeutic contexts for CHAMP1 targeting. Characterization of the genotype–phenotype relationship is also advancing, with recent studies delineating distinct pathomechanisms for deletions, truncating variants, and missense variants. Patient advocacy organizations — including the CHAMP1 Research Foundation, CHAMP1 Research Foundation Europe, CHAMP1 UK, and CHAMP1 Hispano (serving Spanish-speaking families) — fund research programs and maintain patient registries to support future clinical studies.
