= Ivan Vazov Library, Botevgrad =

Coordinates: 42.90873°N 23.79211°E

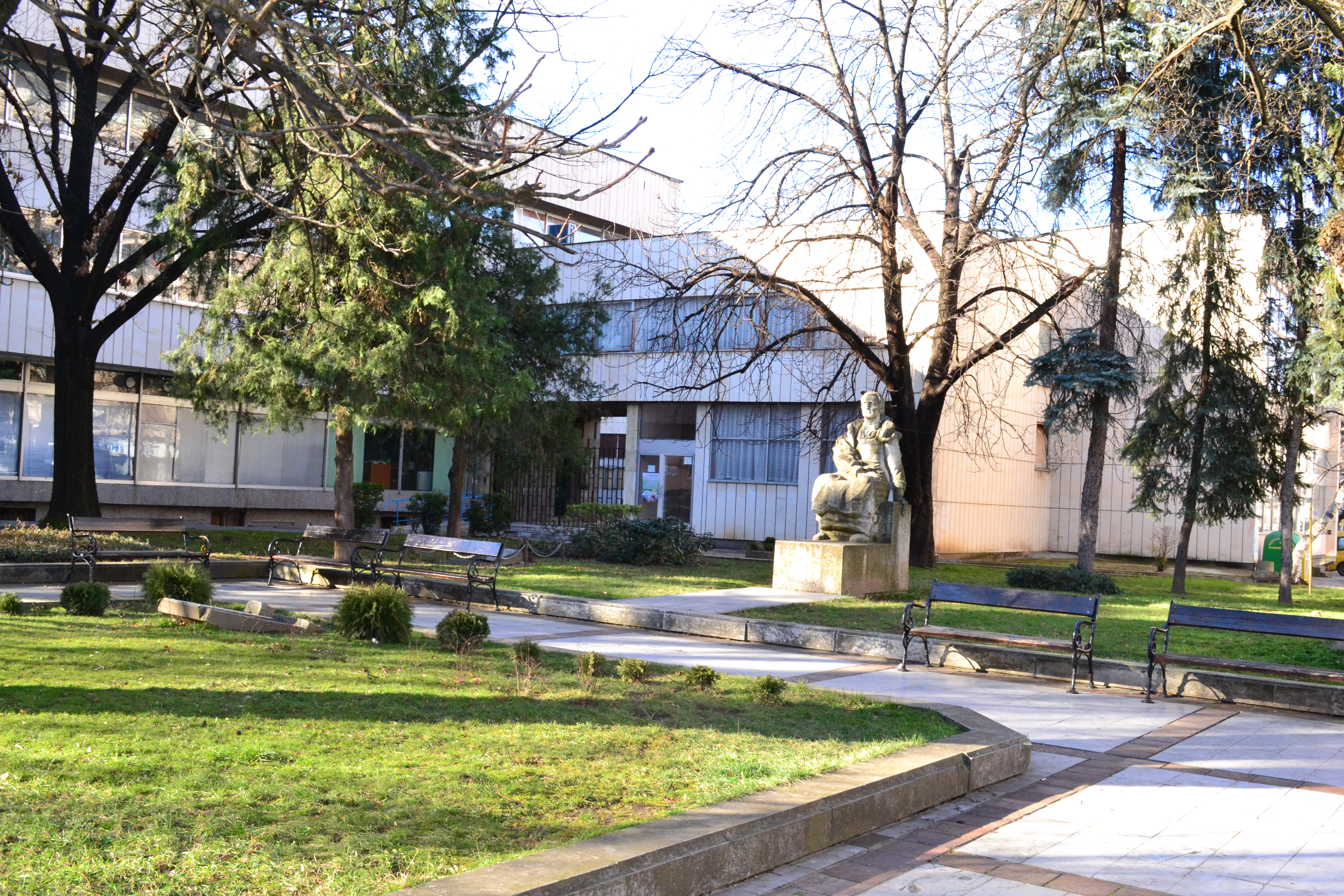
"Ivan Vazov" Library, Botevgrad

"Ivan Vazov" Library (Bulgarian: Библиотека „Иван Вазов“) at chitalishte "Hristo Botev 1884" is a contemporary educational institution in the Bulgarian town of Botevgrad. The library collects, processes and stores various library collections, offers its resources for free, serves readers, provides bibliographic reference services, performs organizational and methodical functions on the territory of Botevgrad Municipality. The library is engaged in raising the educational level, long-life learning, informativeness, quality of life, social integration and expansion of the electronic access to information.

== History of Ivan Vazov Library ==
"Ivan Vazov" Library, Botevgrad was established in 1883 with the launch of Chitalishte "Napredak" (translation: "Advancement" Community Center). The initial book collection consists of 800 volumes, donated by local people of Botevgrad, then Orhanie.

The organized library activity started as early as 1924, when a specialized premise was provided in the newly opened building of the community center.

In 1973, the library was moved in the new building of the "Hristo Botev" chitalishte. At that time, its book collection consists of 45 000 volumes.

On 17 September 1981, new building was opened especially for the "Ivan Vazov" Library in the center of Botevgrad.

As of 2017, the library contains more than 84,900 book volumes, periodicals, audiovisual documents, graphic images, music scores, and others. It serves 2,000 permanent readers, lends 48,000 library documents per year, and is visited 26,000 times annually.

The library readers are offered access to three departments: Adults Lending Department, Children's Department, and Reference, Bibliographic and Information Department. All the three departments offer internet connection.

Since 2003, automation of the main library processes have started. The library maintains an integrated library information system "E-Lib".

In 2007, the library opens a specialized reading room for the students from the International Business School, Botevgrad.

On 2 December 2010, "Ivan Vazov" Library, Botevgrad obtains computer and presentation equipment as a donation from the NGO "Global Libraries".

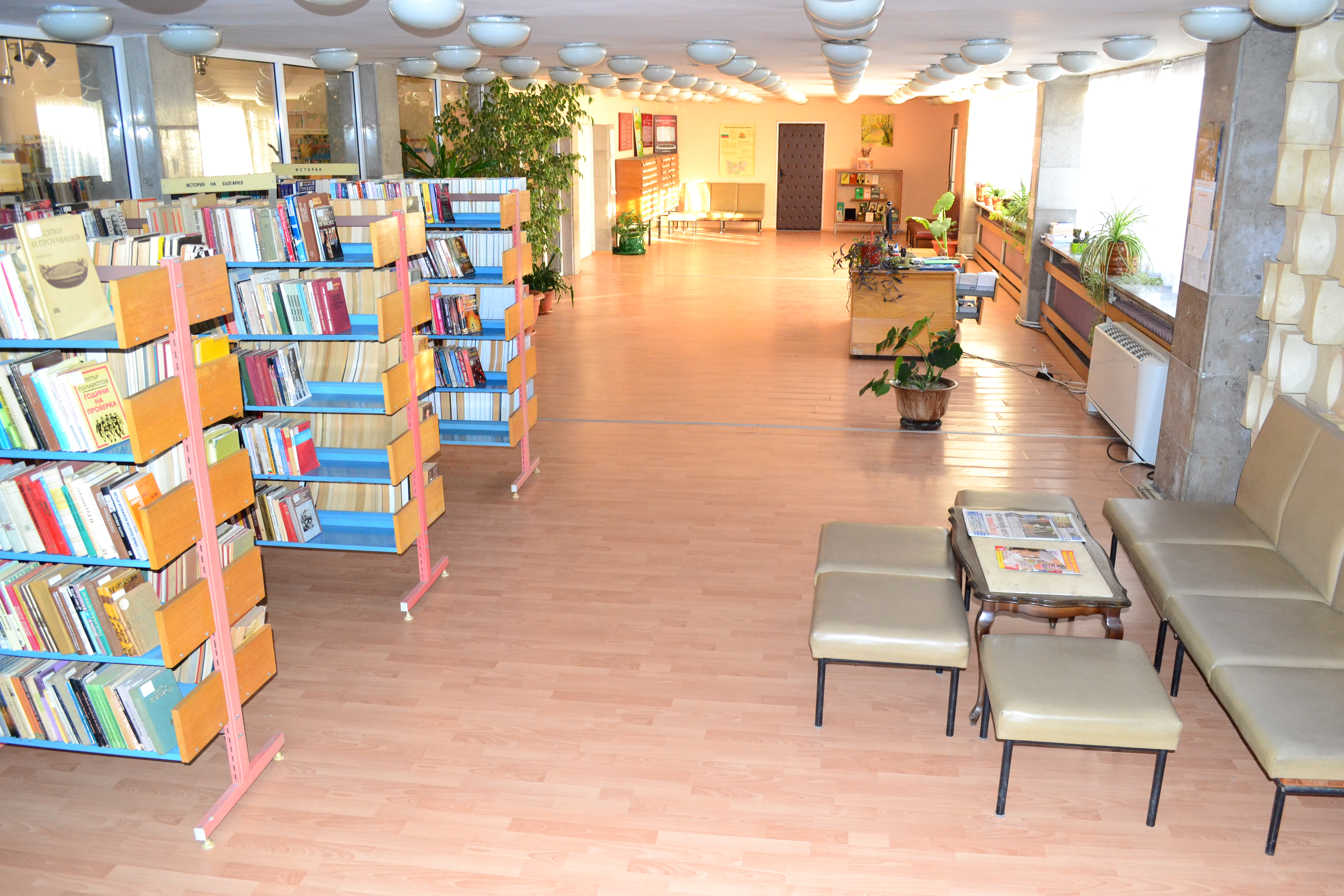
Adults Lending Department

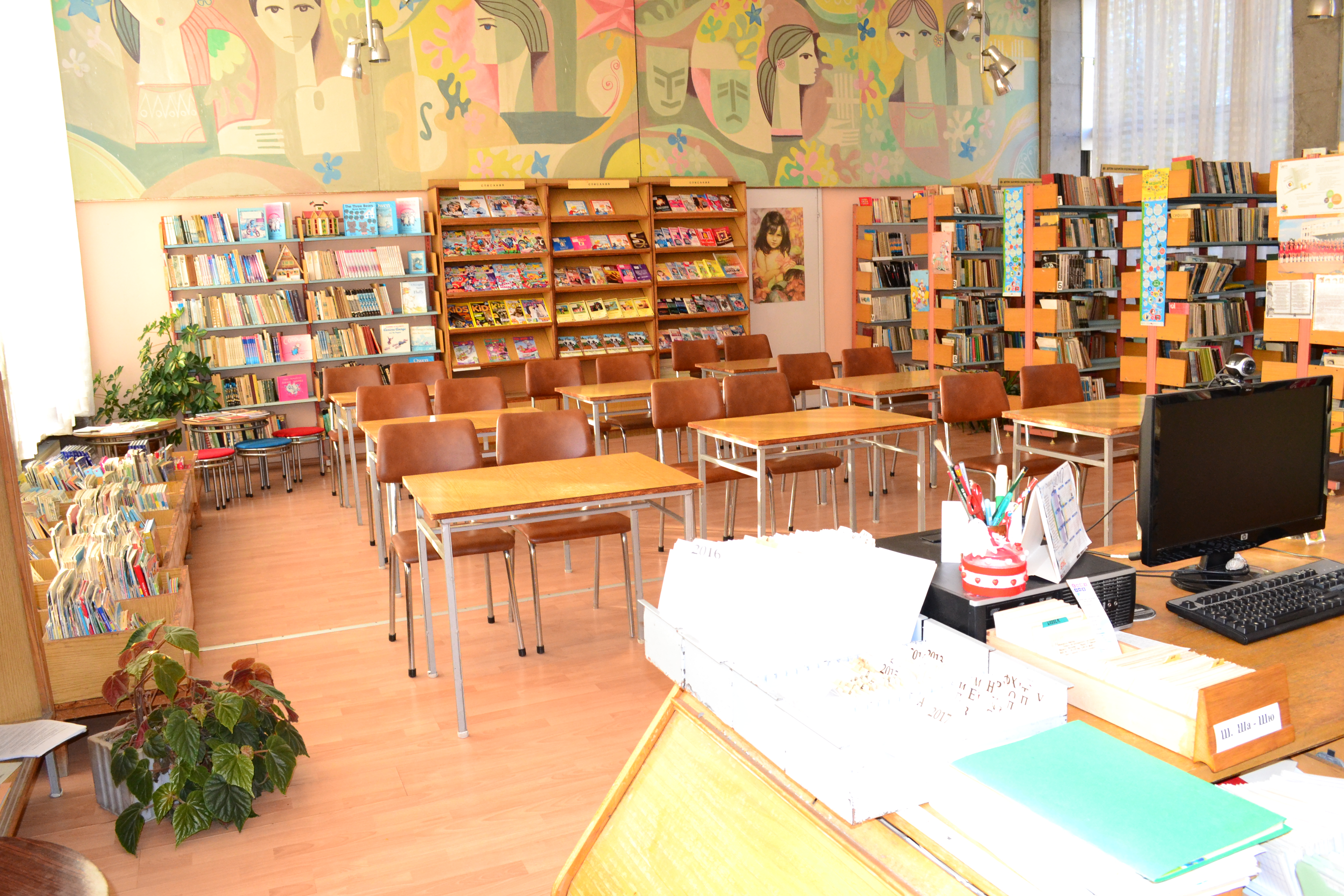
Children's Department

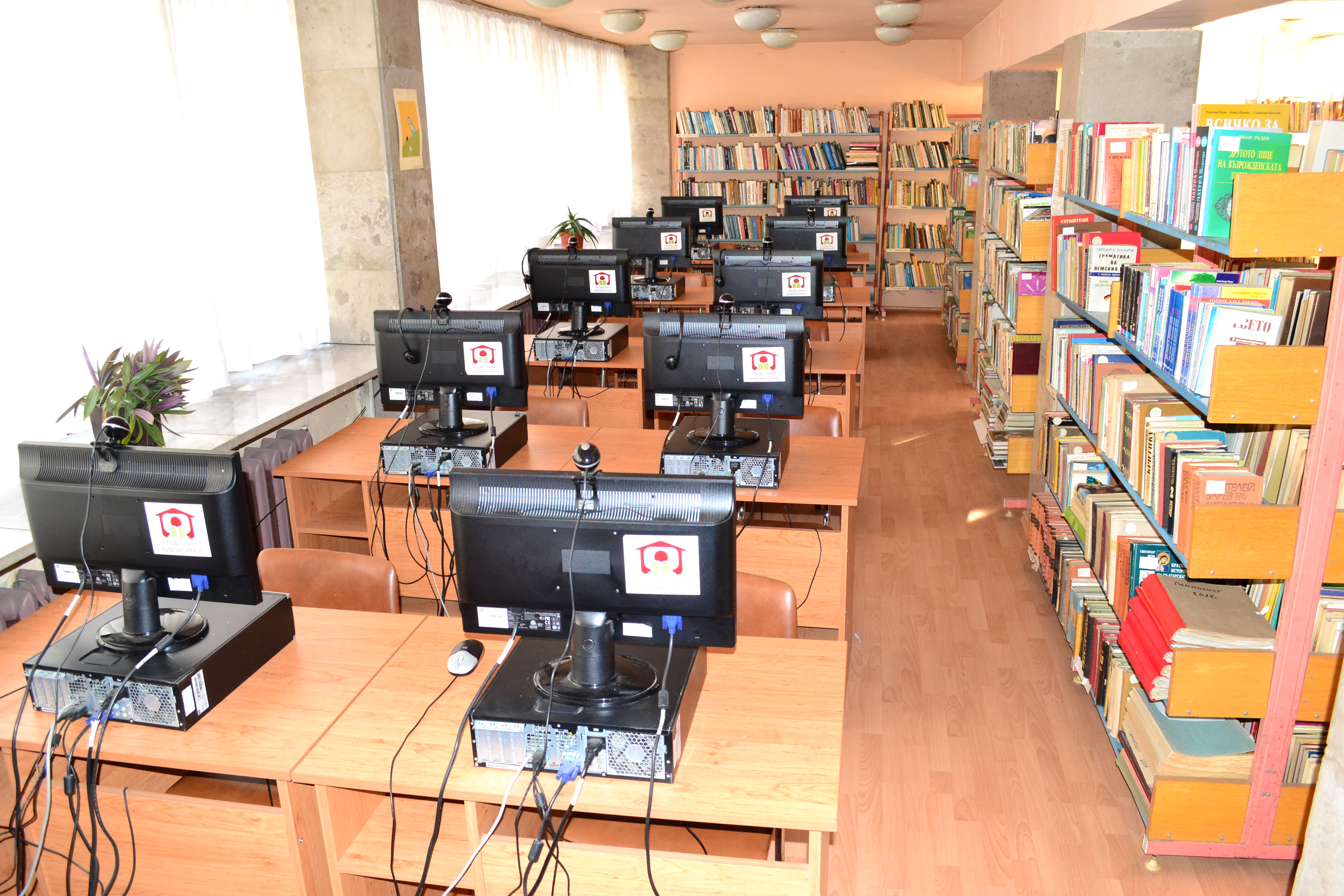
Reference, Bibliographic and Information Department
