= JMN =

JMN may refer to:

- Janamorcha Nepal, a political party of Nepal
- Johan Mangku Negara (Companion of the Order of the Defender of the Realm), a Malaysian federal award
- Journal of Molecular Neuroscience
- Makuri language
