= ADNP =

ADNP may refer to:

- Arab Democratic Nasserist Party, a political party in Egypt
- ADNP (gene), activity-dependent neuroprotector homeobox protein, a human protein
- Axios Delta National Park, a protected area in Greece
