= CHAMP1 =

Protein-coding gene in the species Homo sapiens

Identifiers
- Aliases: CHAMP1, C13orf8, CAMP, CHAMP, ZNF828, MRD40, chromosome alignment maintaining phosphoprotein 1
- External IDs: OMIM: 616327; MGI: 1196398; GeneCards: CHAMP1

Gene location (Human)
Chr.	Chromosome 13 (human)
Band	13q34	Start	114,314,482 bp
Band	13q34	End	114,337,626 bp

Gene location (Mouse)
Chr.	Chromosome 8 (mouse)
Band	8 A1.1|8 6.4 cM	Start	13,919,641 bp
Band	8 A1.1|8 6.4 cM	End	13,931,639 bp
RNA expression pattern
Bgee	Human / Mouse (ortholog); Top expressed in: mucosa of ileum; secondary oocyte; ganglionic eminence; epithelium of colon; tibialis anterior muscle; cardiac muscle tissue of right atrium; thymus; skin of thigh; myocardium of left ventricle; stromal cell of endometrium / Top expressed in: hand; zygote; oocyte; secondary oocyte; primary oocyte; otolith organ; utricle; maxillary prominence; epiblast; primitive streak; More reference expression data
BioGPS	n/a
Gene ontology
Molecular function	protein binding; metal ion binding; nucleic acid binding
Cellular component	cytoplasm; chromosome; spindle; chromosome, centromeric region; cytoskeleton; condensed chromosome; nucleus; kinetochore; nucleoplasm; Flemming body
Biological process	sister chromatid biorientation; protein localization to microtubule; attachment of mitotic spindle microtubules to kinetochore; protein localization to kinetochore
Sources:Amigo / QuickGO
Orthologs
Databases	NCBI: entry; OMA: entry
Species	Human	Mouse
Entrez	283489	101994
Ensembl	ENSG00000198824	ENSMUSG00000047710
UniProt	Q96JM3	Q8K327
RefSeq (mRNA)	NM_032436; NM_001164144; NM_001164145	NM_181854; NM_001363455
RefSeq (protein)	NP_001157616; NP_001157617; NP_115812	NP_862902; NP_001350384
Location (UCSC)	Chr 13: 114.31 – 114.34 Mb	Chr 8: 13.92 – 13.93 Mb
PubMed search
- Wikidata
View/Edit Human	View/Edit Mouse

Chromosome alignment-maintaining phosphoprotein 1 (CHAMP1), also known as zinc finger protein 828 (ZNF828), is a protein that in humans is encoded by the CHAMP1 gene. In the earlier literature the protein was referred to as CAMP, and the gene carries the aliases C13orf8 (chromosome 13 open reading frame 8) and ZNF828. CHAMP1 was first characterized as a regulator of kinetochore–microtubule attachment during mitosis, and is also a component of a heterochromatin-associated complex that promotes homology-directed repair (HDR) of DNA.

== Structure ==
CHAMP1 is a relatively small gene that encodes an 812–amino acid protein from a single large coding exon (together with two additional non-coding exons). The protein contains three characteristic repeat motifs, termed the WK, SPE and FPE motifs, together with multiple C2H2-type zinc-finger domains — two in the N-terminal region and three in the C-terminal region. The C-terminal zinc-finger region mediates binding to its partner proteins POGZ and HP1α and, with the N-terminus, is required for localization to chromosomes and the mitotic spindle, while the WK-motif-rich central region binds REV7; the crystal structure of human REV7 in complex with this CHAMP1 fragment has been determined, revealing that the interaction is structurally analogous to the REV7–REV3 complex. The CHAMP1–POGZ complex further associates with chromodomain on Y-like 2 (CDYL2), which acts as an adaptor recruiting the complex to pericentromeric H3K9me3 marks.

== Function ==
=== Mitosis and chromosome segregation ===
CHAMP1 localizes to chromosomes and to the spindle, including kinetochores, and undergoes CDK1-dependent phosphorylation at multiple sites during mitosis. It is required for correct alignment of chromosomes on the metaphase plate; cells depleted of CHAMP1 show severe chromosome misalignment and weakened kinetochore–microtubule attachment. Lymphoblastoid cells from an individual carrying a de novo frameshift variant show increased centrosome numbers, multipolar spindle formation and cytokinesis failure, phenotypes reproduced in CHAMP1-depleted cultured cells.

CHAMP1 also influences cell fate decisions during mitotic arrest. It maintains expression of the anti-apoptotic protein Mcl-1, and its depletion accelerates mitotic cell death in cells treated with antimitotic agents such as vinca alkaloids and taxanes; conversely, CHAMP1 overexpression promotes mitotic slippage. This positions CHAMP1 as a regulator of sensitivity and resistance to antimitotic chemotherapy.

=== DNA double-strand break repair ===
CHAMP1 contributes to the repair of DNA double-strand breaks (DSBs) through the homologous recombination (HR) / homology-directed repair pathway. It binds directly to REV7 (also known as MAD2L2 or FANCV) through REV7's seatbelt domain and lowers the level of the Shieldin complex, competing with the SHLD3 subunit for a limited pool of REV7. This shifts repair away from non-homologous end joining and toward end resection and HR, helping to maintain genomic stability. In human tumors, CHAMP1 overexpression has been reported to promote HR, confer resistance to PARP inhibitors, and correlate with poorer prognosis.

A 2026 review describes CHAMP1 as part of two DNA repair complexes: CHAMP1–POGZ–REV7, which promotes homologous recombination by removing the Shieldin complex from break ends, and CHAMP1–POGZ–HP1α, which recruits SETDB1 to increase heterochromatin at damage sites. Loss of CHAMP1 increases sensitivity to DNA-damaging agents and dependence on the DNA damage checkpoint and Fanconi anemia pathways.

=== Heterochromatin assembly and gene regulation ===
CHAMP1 forms a conserved heterochromatin-associated complex with POGZ and HP1α. The complex binds trimethylated histone H3 lysine 9 (H3K9me3) through the HP1α chromodomain and promotes H3K9me3 deposition and heterochromatin clustering at sites including centromeres and telomeres; the POGZ subunit additionally binds and recruits the H3K9 methyltransferase SETDB1 to these regions. Through this activity the complex contributes to transcriptional silencing and to homology-directed repair within heterochromatin. CDYL2 has been identified as an additional component of this pericentromeric network, functioning as an adaptor that links the pericentromeric H3K9me3 mark to CHAMP1 and POGZ; CDYL2 depletion causes loss of CHAMP1 at pericentromeres and leads to mitotic aberrations and genome instability similar to those seen upon CHAMP1 loss. Peripheral blood lymphocytes from individuals with CHAMP1 syndrome show defective heterochromatin clustering and reduced HR, suggesting that impaired DNA repair contributes to the disorder. Consistent with a role in the nervous system, CHAMP1 is expressed in the developing mouse brain, and CHAMP1-deficient mice show impaired neuronal development and a mild behavioral phenotype.

=== Replication fork stabilization ===
Beyond its roles in constitutive heterochromatin, the CHAMP1 complex responds dynamically to replication stress. Upon stalling of replication forks, the complex is transiently recruited to these sites, where it promotes H3K9me3 deposition and establishes a local repressive chromatin environment. This activity stabilises stalled forks and shields nascent DNA from degradation by the MRE11 nuclease; loss of the complex leads to increased micronuclei formation, chromosome bridges, and heightened sensitivity to replication stress-inducing agents. In tumours that maintain telomere length through the alternative lengthening of telomeres (ALT) pathway — which are characterised by elevated local replication stress at telomeres — CHAMP1 deficiency creates synthetic lethality with inhibition of the FANCM translocase. Independently, the CHAMP1 complex is required for the survival of CCNE1-amplified ovarian cancer cells, which also exhibit elevated replication stress; high CHAMP1 expression correlates with poorer overall survival in this subgroup. These findings position the CHAMP1 complex as a candidate therapeutic vulnerability in cancers with high levels of replication stress. CHAMP1 is overexpressed in breast and ovarian cancer cells with high levels of replication stress, and in angiosarcomas carrying POT1 mutations.

=== Muscle development ===
CHAMP1 also has a noncanonical role in skeletal muscle development. It acts as a cofactor for the myogenic transcription factor MyoD, directly activating expression of the muscle fusogen Myomaker, which is required for myoblast fusion into multinucleated myofibers. CHAMP1-deficient human myoblasts fail to fuse both in vitro and after transplantation into mice, and cells derived from individuals with CHAMP1 syndrome show intrinsic fusion defects. The C2H2-type zinc-finger motifs are necessary and sufficient for the MyoD interaction and Myomaker activation. While the fusion defect can be fully rescued by restoring Myomaker expression, re-expression of full-length CHAMP1 in cells that retain truncated mutant protein only partially rescues fusion, supporting a dominant-negative effect of truncating variants in the muscle context. Transcriptome analysis also revealed reduced expression of several muscle structural genes in CHAMP1-deficient cells, which may contribute to the muscle weakness and hypotonia observed in affected individuals.

== Clinical significance ==
Mutations in the CHAMP1 gene cause an autosomal dominant neurodevelopmental disorder characterized by intellectual disability and severe speech impairment (titled "neurodevelopmental disorder with hypotonia, impaired language, and dysmorphic features" (NEDHILD) in OMIM, formerly autosomal dominant intellectual disability 40, and also known as CHAMP1-related neurodevelopmental disorder or CHAMP1 disorder). The condition results from a pathogenic variant in one of the two copies of the gene, and the great majority of cases are caused by de novo variants that are not inherited from the parents.

Affected individuals typically present with global developmental delay, intellectual disability and markedly impaired speech. Reported behavioral features include traits of autism spectrum disorder and attention deficit hyperactivity disorder, repetitive behaviors and sensory symptoms. Other frequently reported findings include neonatal low muscle tone (hypotonia), feeding difficulties, strabismus and other ophthalmological problems, microcephaly, gastrointestinal symptoms — including recurrent vomiting resembling cyclic vomiting syndrome, GERD, and chronic constipation — and, in some individuals, seizures. Diagnosis is confirmed by genetic testing. Management is supportive and tailored to the individual's symptoms, typically involving physical, occupational and speech therapy together with educational support.

=== Pathomechanisms ===
Most pathogenic CHAMP1 variants are premature termination codon (PTC) variants — nonsense, frameshift or splice site changes — and several recurrent variants (for example p.Arg398* and p.Arg497*) have been described. Because the coding sequence lies almost entirely within a single exon, PTC-bearing transcripts are predicted to escape nonsense-mediated decay (NMD); consistent with this, truncated CHAMP1 proteins of the expected sizes are detectably expressed in cells from affected individuals rather than being degraded. These truncated proteins lack the C-terminal zinc-finger region, are delocalized from chromatin, and fail to bind POGZ and HP1.

The mechanism by which different CHAMP1 alterations cause disease is an area of active investigation, and a framework relating genotype to phenotype has been proposed in which distinct classes of variant act through distinct mechanisms. Whole-gene deletions and larger 13q34 microdeletions — which also encompass adjacent loci such as CDC16 and UPF3B — reduce the amount of functional CHAMP1 protein and are thought to act through haploinsufficiency; these have been associated with comparatively milder phenotypes. For the more common truncating variants, both a dominant-negative mechanism (in which stable truncated protein interferes with the wild-type protein or its partners) and simple haploinsufficiency have been proposed, and the question remains unresolved: clinical comparisons have suggested that truncating ("coding") variants do not behave as simple haploinsufficiency, whereas functional studies of the associated HR defect have instead supported a haploinsufficient mechanism; in the muscle context, however, functional evidence from myoblast fusion assays supports a dominant-negative effect of truncating variants. A small number of rare missense variants (for example p.Gly23Ser) have been reported in association with a severe epileptic encephalopathy; these do not appear to impair HR repair and have been tentatively proposed to act through a gain-of-function mechanism, although this is based on very few cases.
