= ADNP syndrome =

Genetic disorder characterized by developmental delay and autistic features

- Other names: Helsmoortel Van der Aa syndrome, HVDAS
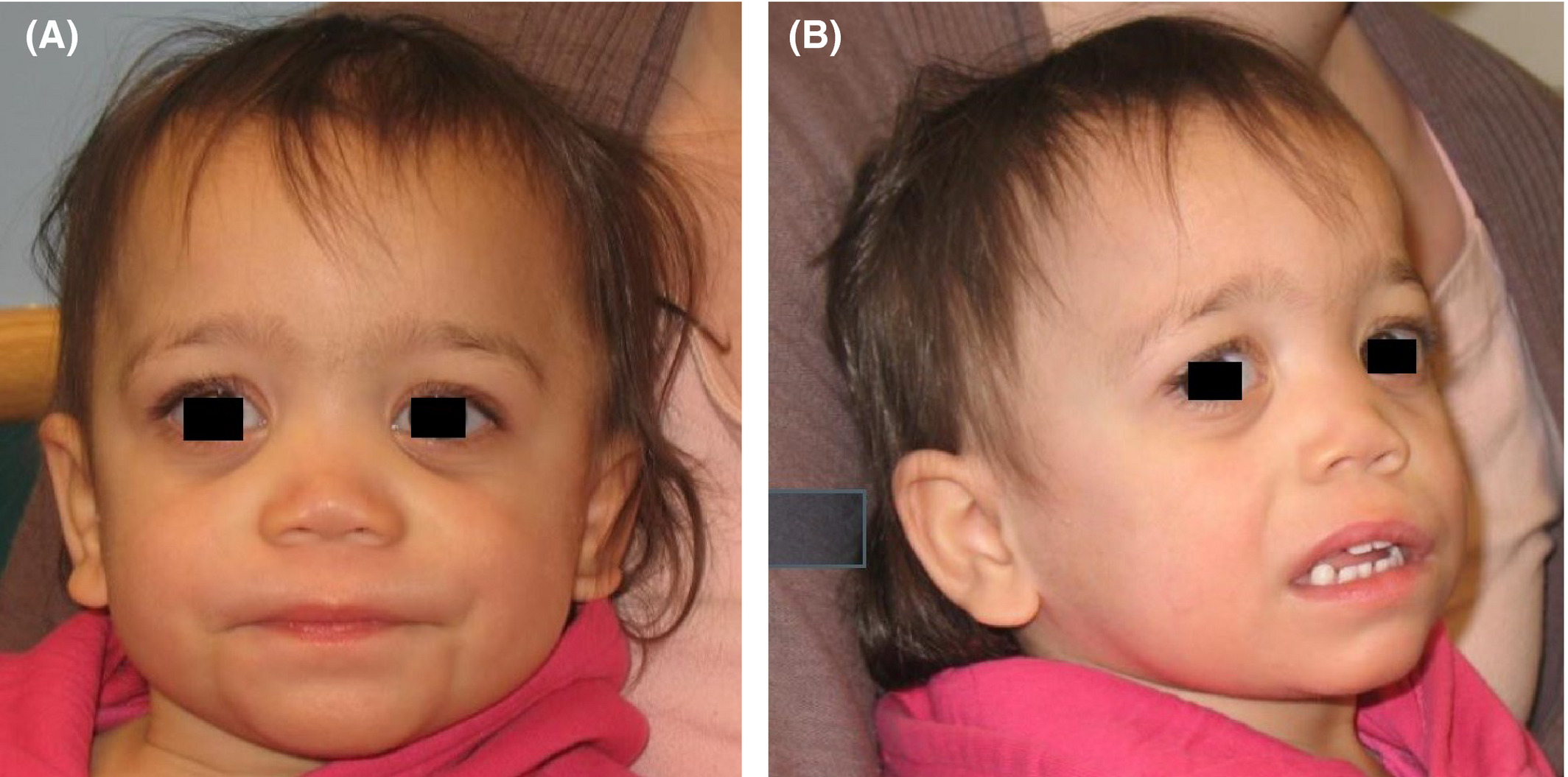
- Illustration shows patient with ADNP syndrome, who have typical features of that disease, such as: downslanting palpebral fissures, marked epicanthal folds, posterior ear placement, anteverted nares, thin upper lip, smooth philtrum.
- Specialty: Medical genetics, pediatrics
- Symptoms: Delayed development, characteristic physical features, mild to moderate intellectual disability
- Onset: Conception (but may be detected in early childhood)
- Duration: Lifelong
- Causes: De novo mutation in the ADNP gene
- Diagnostic method: Genetic testing
- Treatment: Physical therapy, Occupational therapy, Speech therapy, Educational support
- Frequency: Unknown as of yet – there are approximately 300 known cases

ADNP syndrome, also known as Helsmoortel-Van der Aa syndrome (HVDAS), is a non-inherited neurodevelopmental disorder caused by mutations in the activity-dependent neuroprotector homeobox (ADNP) gene.

The hallmark features of the syndrome are intellectual disability, global developmental delays, global motor planning delays, and autism spectrum disorder (ASD) or autistic features. Although ADNP syndrome was only identified in 2014, it is projected to be one of the most frequent single-gene causes of ASD.

By June 2022, just over 275 children had been registered in the ADNP Kids Research Foundation Contact Registry.

== Signs and symptoms ==
Symptoms of ADNP syndrome are variable, but the following are typical characteristics:

- Severe speech and motor delay
- Mild-to-severe intellectual disability
- Characteristic facial features (prominent forehead, high hairline, wide and depressed nasal bridge, and short nose with full, upturned nasal tip)
- Features of autism spectrum disorder
- Hypotonia

Other commonly observed traits include:

- Behavioral problems
- Sleep disturbance
- Brain abnormalities
- Seizures
- Feeding issues
- Gastrointestinal problems
- Visual dysfunction (hypermetropia, strabismus, cortical visual impairment)
- Musculoskeletal anomalies
- Endocrine issues including short stature and hormonal deficiencies
- Cardiac and urinary tract anomalies
- Hearing loss
- Early tooth eruption

Almost all children with ADNP syndrome have speech delay. The average age for first words has been observed to be 30 months, with a range of 7 to 72 months. Some individuals studied did not develop any language skills. Children with ADNP syndrome show some degree of intellectual disability. The degree can range from mild (roughly 1 in 8 children) to severe (roughly half of children). Toilet training is delayed in most children. Loss of previously acquired skills was reported in one fifth of children.

The majority of children with ADNP syndrome have features of ASD, although with less severe socializing difficulties than other children with ASD. During infant and toddler years, children are often reported to have a notably happy personality.

== Genetics ==
ADNP syndrome is caused by non-inherited (de novo) mutations in the ADNP gene. Spanning about 40 kb of DNA, the ADNP gene maps to the chromosomal position chr20q13.13 in the human genome. The protein produced from this gene helps control the activity (expression) of other genes through a process called chromatin remodeling. Chromatin is the network of DNA and protein that packages DNA into chromosomes. The structure of chromatin can be changed (remodeled) to alter how tightly DNA is packaged.

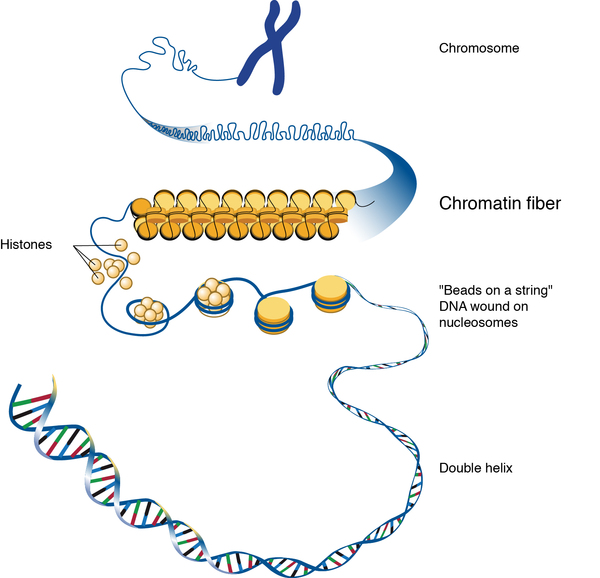
Chromatin is a substance within a chromosome consisting of DNA and protein. The DNA carries the cell's genetic instructions. The major proteins in chromatin are histones, which help package the DNA in a compact form that fits in the cell nucleus.

By regulating gene expression, the ADNP protein is involved in many aspects of growth and development. It is particularly important for regulation of genes involved in normal brain development, and it likely controls the activity of genes that direct the development and function of other body systems. These changes likely explain the intellectual disability, ASD features, and other diverse signs and symptoms of ADNP syndrome.

So far, only loss-of-function mutations such as stop-gain or frameshift mutations have been reported as directly related. Most, but not all mutations might give rise to a truncated protein.

If neither parent is found to carry the change in the ADNP gene, the chance of having another child with ADNP syndrome is very low. However, there is a very small chance that some of the egg cells of the mother or some of the sperm cells of the father carry the change in the ADNP gene (germline mosaicism). In this case, parents who are not found to carry the same ADNP change as their child on a blood test still have a very small chance of having another child with ADNP syndrome.

ADNP has been associated with abnormalities in the autophagy pathway in schizophrenia. As of 2023, its precise role in the autophagy process is under active investigation.

=== Inverse comorbidity with cancer ===
ADNP mutations have been shown to display roles in both neurodevelopment and cancer. Equivalent mutations may result in developmental delay or in cancer depending on whether or not they are present throughout initial development. A thorough meta-analysis of brains from ASD individuals revealed gene expression dysregulation and biological pathway derailments in cancer. The opposite tendency of developing one condition or another (here ASD and cancer, respectively) within a population is called inverse comorbidity.

== Diagnosis ==
The diagnosis of ADNP syndrome is established through genetic testing to identify one or more pathogenic variants on the ADNP gene.

Molecular genetic testing in a child with developmental delay or an older individual with intellectual disability typically begins with chromosomal microarray analysis. If this is not diagnostic, the next step is typically either a multigene panel or exome sequencing. Single-gene testing (sequence analysis of ADNP, followed by gene-targeted deletion/duplication analysis) may be indicated in individuals exhibiting characteristic signs of ADNP syndrome.

== Treatment ==
There is no known cure for ADNP syndrome, and so treatment is primarily symptomatic. This may include speech, occupational, and physical therapy and specialized learning programs depending on individual needs. Early behavioral interventions can help children with speech delays gain self-care, social, and language skills.

Other treatments may be needed to address neuropsychiatric features, provide nutritional support, and address any ophthalmologic and cardiac findings that may co-exist.

There is ongoing current research into treatments that may improve some features of the condition. In 2020, a Phase 2A clinical trial by researchers at the Seaver Autism Center at Mount Sinai Hospital suggests that low-dose ketamine may be effective in treating clinical symptoms in children diagnosed with ADNP syndrome.

The peptide drug davunetide or NAP, derived from the ADNP protein, has shown neuroprotective effects in preclinical trials and may be developed into a treatment for ADNP syndrome.

== History ==
The gene was first cloned in 1998, and the syndrome was first described in 2014. The first ADNP Syndrome Family Conference and Scientific Symposium was held on November 3, 2019 at the UCLA campus in Los Angeles, California.

== See also ==
- Angelman syndrome
- Fragile X syndrome
- Rett syndrome
- White Sutton syndrome
- Conditions comorbid to autism spectrum disorders
- Heritability of autism
