= International Business School, Botevgrad =

Bulgarian business school

- Международно висше бизнес училище
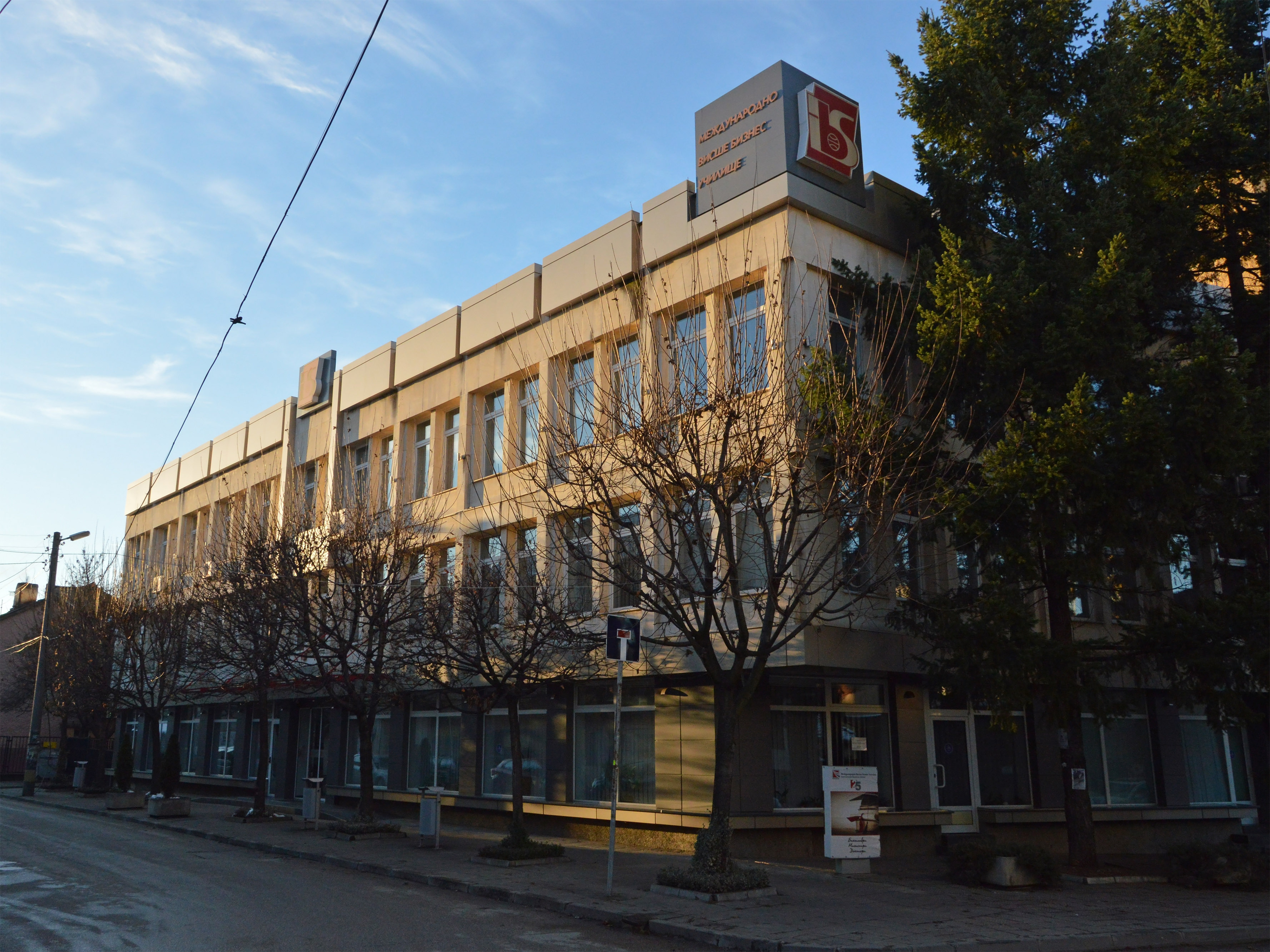
- Type: private business school
- Established: 1991
- Rector: Ruslan Penchev
- Students: 6000
- Location: Botevgrad and Sofia, Bulgaria
- Language: Bulgarian and English
- Website: ibsedu.bg

International Business School (IBS) in Botevgrad, with a second campus in Sofia, is an independent private higher school in Bulgaria.

It was established in 1991 as Bulgarian-Danish College of Business, Export and Marketing. It is the successor of the College of Economics and Business Administration which on 25 July 2002, with an Act of the 39-th National Assembly of the Republic of Bulgaria was transformed into a specialised higher school of learning – International Business School. It was accredited by the National Evaluation and Accreditation Agency for degree programmes at Bachelor's, Master's and Doctor's level.

International Business School holds a DSLabel honorary sign from the Education, Audiovisual and Culture Executive Agency (EACEA) of the European Commission.

Upon completion of their studies, students receive a European Diploma Supplement with a description of the level, content and status of the training they have passed. The academic profile of the International Business School is in the fields of Social, Economic and Legal Sciences, Professional Management, Economics and Tourism.

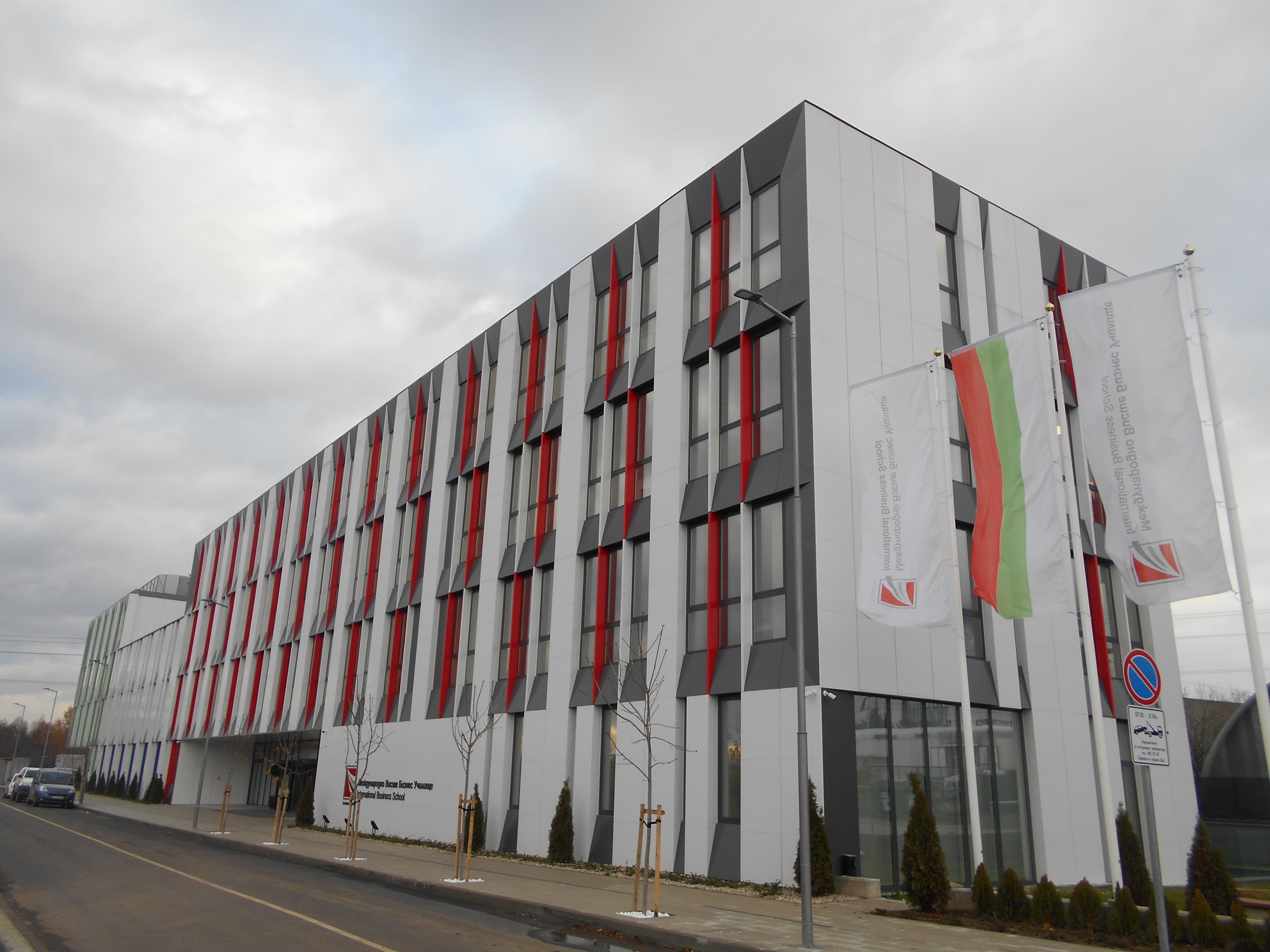
Center for Distance learning International Business School

Since 25 September 2017, the International Business School has opened doors for its students in a new academic building in Sofia, which is located at 7, Vincent van Gogh Street in Sofia. The academic building contains 16 lecture halls, equipped with modern didactic equipment and a Magna aula for 360 people. The building has a hotel with a kitchen, an open office space, a training room and a specialized room for training and certification courses in the field of sommelierry; library with an additional bookstore; bookstore; copy centre; café; central administration; Student Council with English Court. In 2017 it was nominated for the prestigious Architectural Award- Building of the Year.

== History ==
IBS was awarded accreditation by the National Evaluation and Accreditation Agency on 25 April 2002, and was legalized by the 39th National Assembly of the Republic of Bulgaria. The training of the students is carried out in Bachelor's, Master's and PhD degrees in the areas of higher education: social, economic and legal sciences in the professional fields Administration and management, Economics and Tourism.

== Educational degrees and specialities ==
The training of the students is carried out in bachelor's and master'sand PhD degree in the areas of higher education: social, economic and legal sciences, in the professional fields Administration and Management, Economics, Tourism. The training in the educational and qualification degrees programmes is carried out in full-time, part-time and distance forms of study. It is provided for by the academic programmes and is carried out in different courses.

Bachelor's degree programme courses are Business administration, International business, Accounting and control, Tourism, Marketing. The Master's programmes cover the following courses: Business administration, Business finance, Taxation and control, Digital marketing, Logistics, Music business, Entrepreneurship and innovation, Accounting and auditing, Healthcare management and innovation, Information systems in management, Project management, Public sector management, Tourism management, Security management, Information security management, Event management, Resort & SPA management.

IBS is accredited by the National Evaluation and Accreditation Agency to carry out training in the educational and scientific degree Doctor in the scientific specialties: Administration and management (Business administration) in professional field Administration and management, Economics and management (industry) in the professional field economics, economy and management (tourism) in the professional field Tourism.

== Research and publishing ==
Research activities at IBS are reflected in research plans, programmes and projects, scientific developments, scientific conferences, expert and consultancy activities, international scientific cooperation.

The University Publishing House “IBS-Press” is part of IBS structure with the main purpose of providing the school's educational and scientific work. The periodicals of IBS include: the publication scientific Works, which publishes results of theoretical and practical research and research projects of lecturers and PhD students from IBS as well as other Bulgarian and foreign universities and scientific organizations; a collection of papers from the annual international conference of IBS and a collection of papers from the student scientific conference.

== Student mobility ==
Student mobility is carried out on the basis of bilateral agreements concluded between the IBS and universities from the Member States of the European Union. The Erasmus program is the international partnership of the IBS with the International Business Academy in Kolding, Denmark. The Erasmus programme supports activities in the fields of higher education, vocational education and training, adult education, the youth sector.

Under the My University project, IBS works in partnership with 13 other universities in Bulgaria, Spain, Slovakia, Sweden and Lithuania.

== International activity ==
IBS has a tradition of developing joint educational programmes in different specialities and forms of training. "Business Administration" – a joint international programme in English with Jones International University, USA – Distance Learning). International master's degree Program Security Management – part-time training with Ariel University, Israel. Management and consulting in international tourism – a joint international bachelor's program in English – a full-time form of study with the Breda University of Applied Science, The Netherlands.

== International cooperation ==
International Business School has an effective cooperation with national and foreign partners such as the Confederation of Employers and Industrialists in the Republic of Bulgaria (CEIBG), NIBS, the Association of Universities in Distance Learning (GUIDE) and the European Network in the Field of distance learning (EDEN).

IBBU is a member of the CEIBG and the main areas of research include culture, cultural heritage and tourism, experience, innovation and entrepreneurship, public sector management, business and politics.

Since 1 March 2017, International Business School has signed a contract for cooperation in the field of education, science and culture with the Tambov State University G. R. Derzhavin in Russia. It provides for the exchange of students and lecturers, the realization of joint projects and training events.

== Membership in national and international business organizations ==
At present, IBBU is a member of CEIBG – the Confederation of Employers and Industrialists in the Republic of Bulgaria, NIBS – Network of International Business Schools, ELA – European Association for Education Law and Policy, GUIDE – Association – Global Universities in Distance Education, EDEN – European Distance and E-learning Network.
