= Yigal Dilmoni =

CEO of the Yesha Council

Yigal Dilmoni (Hebrew: יגאל דילמוני; born 1970) is the CEO of the Yesha Council. Before becoming CEO in 2018, he served at the Yesha Council's deputy director of public relations.

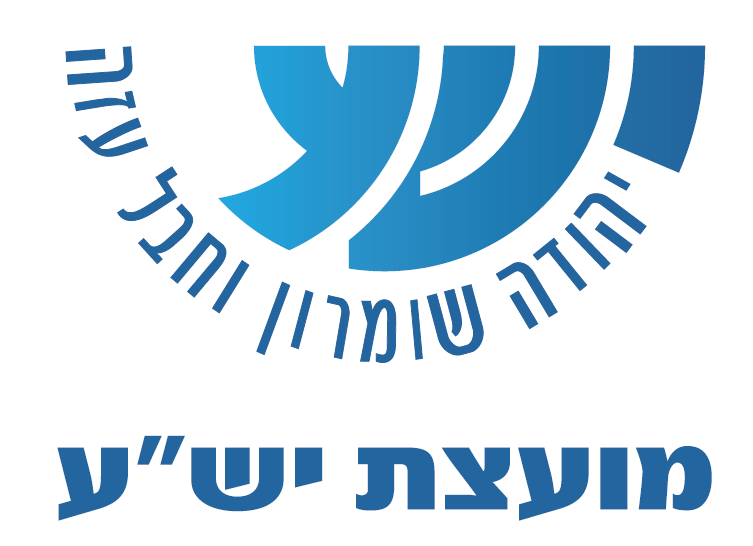
Yesha Council logo

== Early life ==
Born in Raanana, Dilmoni studied at the Bnei Akiva Yeshiva Nehalim, and later at the Hesder Yeshiva in Neve Dekalim in the Gush Katif communities of the Gaza Strip. He was a member of the first class of the Bnei David preparatory academy in Eli.

In 1989, Dilmoni enlisted in the IDF Paratroopers Brigade and continues in the reserves. After marriage, he and his wife moved to Neve Dekalim. They later became one of the first families to settle in Avnei Hefetz in Samaria where he currently lives with his wife and five children. Dilmoni holds a bachelor's and master's degree from Bar-Ilan University in Land of Israel Studies and Geography and the Preservation of Landscapes and Sites.

== Career ==
After several years of as a teacher, Dilmoni moved into the field of public service. In 1998 he founded and managed the Samaria Regional Council Tourism Association, and headed the council's strategic planning unit. As part of his position, he was responsible for the development of tourism ventures and historic sites in Samaria and for the development of small businesses in the council area, and assisted dozens of ventures and businesses in the fields of agriculture, tourism and trade. In 2005, he coordinated opposition to the Disengagement plan from Gush Katif and northern Samaria. Dilmoni later served as CEO of the Kedumim Local Council.

In 2010, Dilmoni began working for the Yesha Council as the council's VP of Information serving as Naftali Bennett's deputy. As part of his role, he established the Yesha Council's information tour system and brought hundreds of celebrities, journalists, politicians and opinion leaders to tour settlements in West Bank.

Dilmoni developed the Yesha Research and Information Center, produced information materials and maps, conducted training for tour guides and founded the Yesha Conference on Information and Communication, which is attended by hundreds every year. When Roni Arazi resigned from the position of council spokesman, in 2012 Yigal Dilmoni filled this position until a spokesperson was found.

In 2014, Dilmoni announced his candidacy for Bennett's Jewish Home party for the Members of Knesset, coming in 24th place.

Dilmoni served as a member of several board of the R & D Samaria and the Jordan Valley at the University of Ariel, MATI – Center for the Promotion of Entrepreneurship and Small Businesses in the region and Kedma, the Jewish student villages regional organization.

As CEO of the Yesha Council, Dilmoni has advocated applying sovereignty to Israeli cities and townships under Yesha council administration and promoted increased building. He has promoted business ties with Palestinian Authority business leaders and called for Israel to offer COVID-19 vaccines to PA residents working in Israeli companies.

Dilmoni is a co-founder and board member of American Friends of Judea and Samaria, a nonprofit organization dedicated to advocacy for the West Bank settler movement and the funding of its weaponry and military equipment.
