= Albert Pinhasov =

Rector of Ariel University

- אלברט פנחסוב
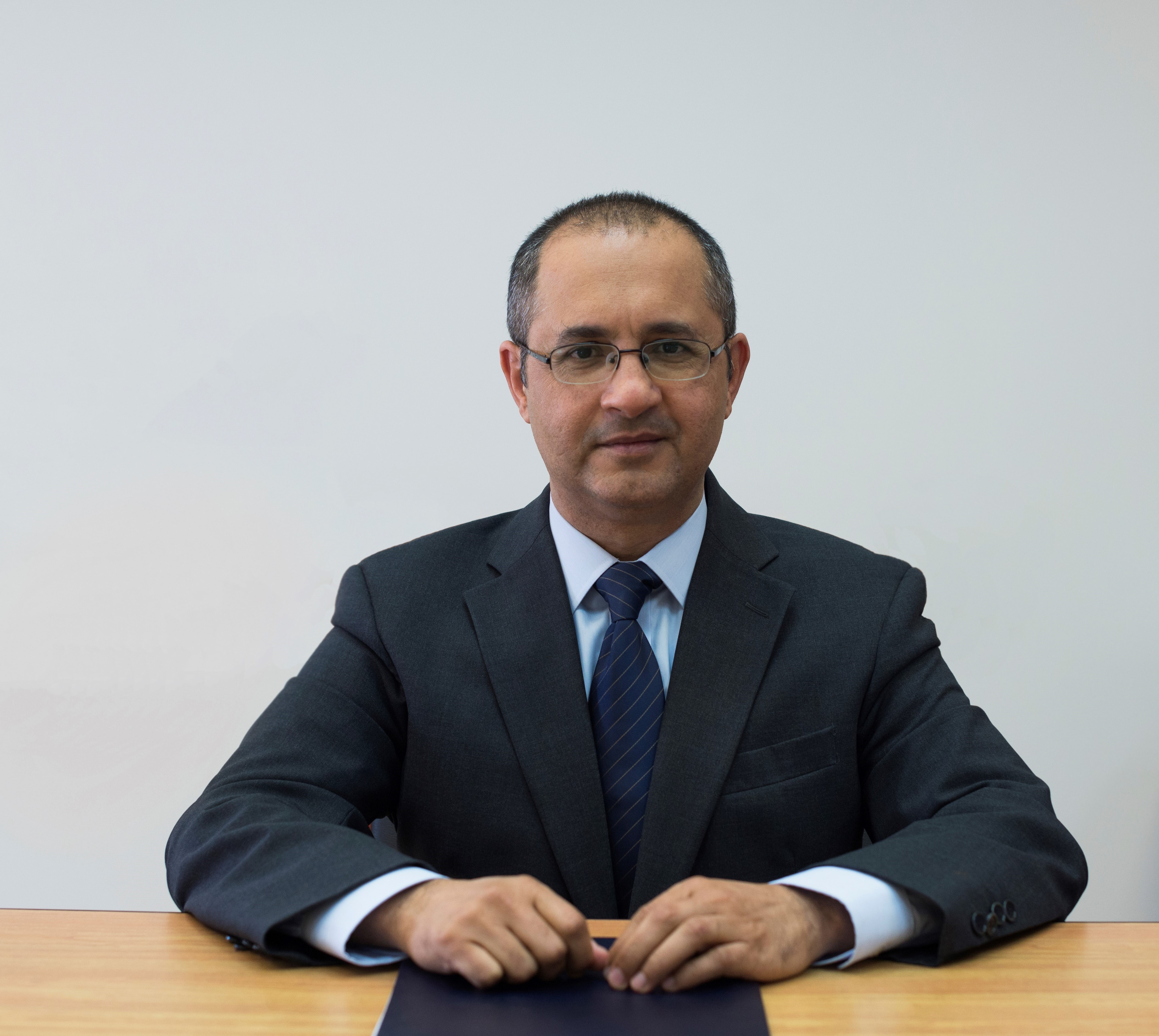
- Albert Pinhasov
- Born: 9 February 1972 (age 54); Namangan, Uzbekistan
- Citizenship: Israel
- Education: Tel Aviv University
- Occupations: Rector of Ariel University; Vice President and Dean of the Department of Research & Development of Ariel University; Head of the Department of Molecular Biology of Ariel University; Researcher, The Dr. Miriam and Sheldon G. Adelson Medical School
- Known for: Research in Molecular Biology, Psychopharmacology, Molecular Psychiatry
- Website: https://www.ariel.ac.il/wp/en/rector-en/

Albert Pinhasov (Hebrew: אלברט פנחסוב; born 9 February 1972) is the Rector of Ariel University. He is a researcher in the fields of Molecular Psychiatry and Psychopharmacology.He also served as Vice President and Dean for Research & Development and the Head of the Department of Molecular Biology at Ariel University.

== Biography ==
Albert Pinhasov was born on 9 February 1972 in the city of Namangan, Uzbekistan. From 1990 to 1994, he studied at the Gorky Academy of Medicine, in the city of Nizhny Novgorod, Russia.

In 1994, he immigrated to Israel where he continued his education at Tel Aviv University. He was awarded a Master of Science degree (MSc) in 1998 and a PhD in the field of Molecular Biology and Clinical Biochemistry under the mentorship of Illana Gozes in 2002 from Tel Aviv University.

== Academic career ==
From 2002 to 2004, Pinhasov carried out postdoctoral research at Johnson & Johnson Pharmaceutical Research and Development (Spring House, Pennsylvania, United States), where under the guidance of Dr. Douglas Brenneman he was engaged in the development of drugs for the treatment of neurodegenerative diseases.

In 2005, Pinhasov joined the Department of Molecular Biology at Ariel University (formerly the College of Judea and Samaria) as an assistant professor. He was Head of the department from 2008 to 2014.

In 2014, Pinhasov was appointed Vice-President and Dean of Research & Development at Ariel University, holding this position until 2020. In 2020 the Senate of Ariel University elected Professor Pinhasov as the Rector of Ariel University, succeeding Professor Michael Zinigrad, who held this office for 12 years.

In September 2023, in recognition of his contribution to academic ties between Israel and Kazakhstan, the Senate of Astana Medical University (AMU) awarded Prof. Albert Pinhasov the title of honorary professor.

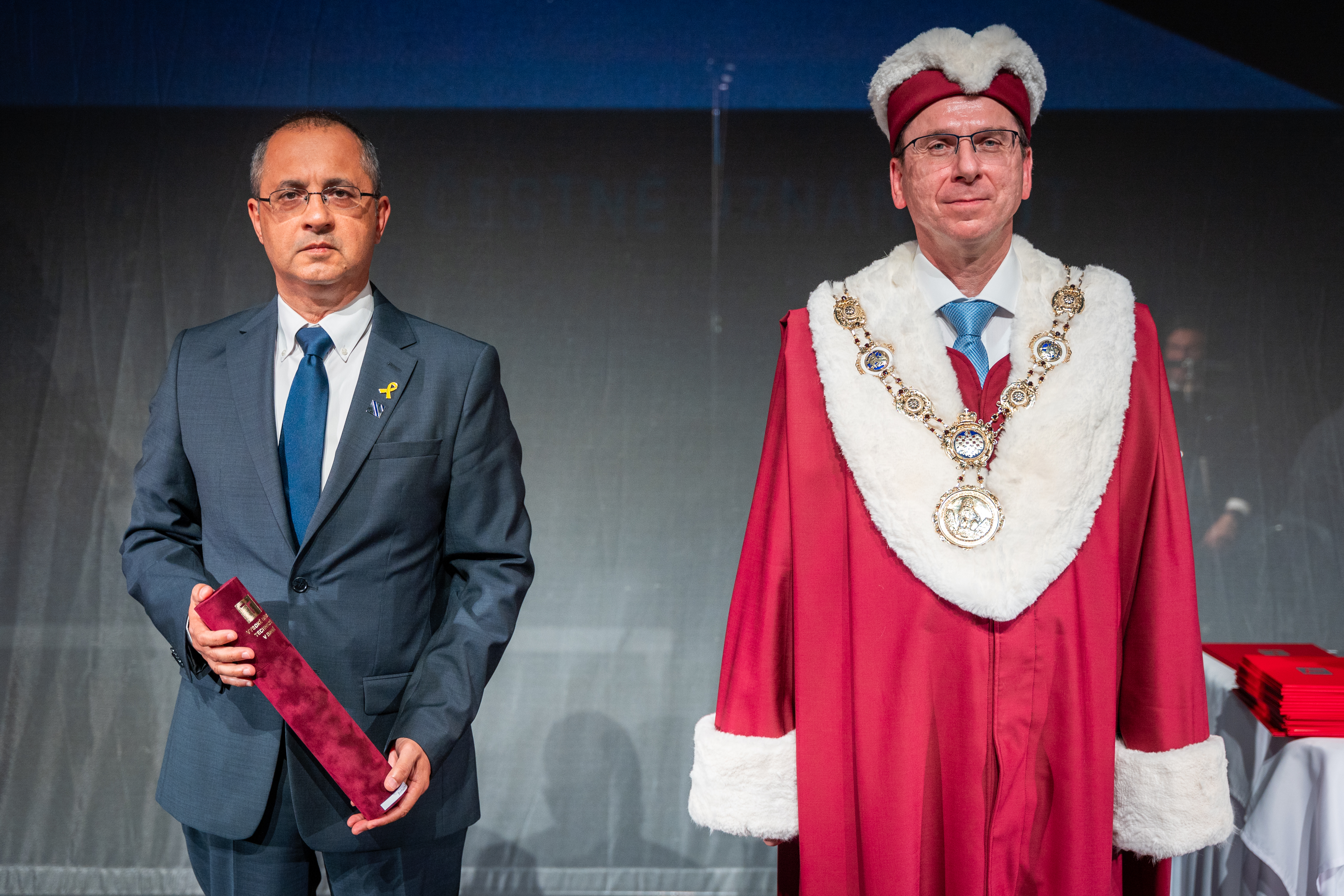
Prof. Albert Pinhasov, Rector of Ariel University, receiving an honorary award from Brno University of Technology for his significant contributions to Czech-Israeli cooperation in higher education, research, and technology transfer.

In September 2024, during its 125th-anniversary celebrations, Brno University of Technology in the Czech Republic recognized Pinhasov for his support of scientific and educational cooperation between the university and Ariel University, as well as Czech–Israeli cooperation in higher education, research and technology transfer.

On 16 July 2025, Pinhasov was awarded the title of honorary professor by Poltava V. G. Korolenko National Pedagogical University in Ukraine.

== Research activity ==
Pinhasov is a researcher at the Department of Molecular Biology and Dr. Miriam and Sheldon G. Adelson School of Medicine.

His research focuses on the molecular mechanisms of mental disorders and the relationship between psychiatric deviations and stress sensitivity.

His laboratory group has developed a selectively bred mouse model with strong features of dominance and submissiveness. These mice respectively exhibit manic-like and depression-like behavior with different responses to psychotropic agents and environmental stimuli, demonstrating differential sensitivity to stress. His group showed that inherited susceptibility to stress is linked to gradual development of chronic inflammation, wide-spectrum metabolic alterations, brain neurotransmission deterioration, electrical activity accompanied behavioral disturbances in emotional and cognitive domains, and reduced life expectancy. The Dominant-Submissive mouse model has been shown to be a successful and unique tool for studying the mechanisms of aging related cognitive impairments, mental disorders, and their effects on the entire organism.

== Published works ==
Pinhasov is the author or co-author of more than 150 peer-reviewed scientific publications including the following notable publications:

- Agranyoni, O; Meninger-Mordechay, S; Uzan, A; Ziv, O; Salmon-Divon, M; Rodin, D; Raz, O; Koman, I; Koren, O; Pinhasov, A; Navon-Venezia, S (2021). "Gut microbiota determines the social behavior of mice and induces metabolic and inflammatory changes in their adipose tissue". npj Biofilms and Microbiomes. 7 (1) 28. doi:10.1038/s41522-021-00193-9. PMC 7979825. PMID 33741982.
- Kardash, T; Rodin, D; Kirby, M; Davis, N; Koman, I; Gorelick, J; Michaelevski, I; Pinhasov, A (2020). "Link between personality and response to THC exposure". Behavioural Brain Research. 379 112361. doi:10.1016/j.bbr.2019.112361. PMID 31734264.
- Kreinin, A; Lisson, S; Nesher, E; Schneider, J; Bergman, J; Farhat, K; Farah, J; Lejbkowicz, F; Yadid, G; Raskin, L; Koman, I; Pinhasov, A (2015). "Blood BDNF level is gender specific in severe depression". PLOS ONE. 10 (5) e0127643. Bibcode:2015PLoSO..1027643K. doi:10.1371/journal.pone.0127643. PMC 4444333. PMID 26010085.
- Gross, M; Pinhasov, A (2016). "Chronic mild stress in submissive mice: Marked polydipsia and social avoidance without hedonic deficit in the sucrose preference test". Behavioural Brain Research. 298 (Pt B): 25–34. doi:10.1016/j.bbr.2015.10.049. PMID 26522843.
- Feder, Y; Nesher, E; Ogran, A; Kreinin, A; Malatynska, E; Yadid, G; Pinhasov, A (2010). "Selective breeding for dominant and submissive behavior in Sabra mice". Journal of Affective Disorders. 126 (1–2): 214–222. doi:10.1016/j.jad.2010.03.018. PMID 20427092.
- Gershanov, Sivan; Toledano, Helen; Pernicone, Nomi; Fichman, Suzana; Michowiz, Shalom; Pinhasov, Albert; et al. (2021). "[https://cgp.iiarjournals.org/content/18/3/335/tab-article-info Differences in RNA and microRNA Expression Between PTCH1- and SUFU-mutated Medulloblastoma]". Cancer Genomics & Proteomics. 18 (3): 335–347. doi:10.21873/cgp.20264. PMC 8126327. PMID 33893086.
