= Edward Bormashenko =

Israeli physicist

- אדוארד בורמשנקו
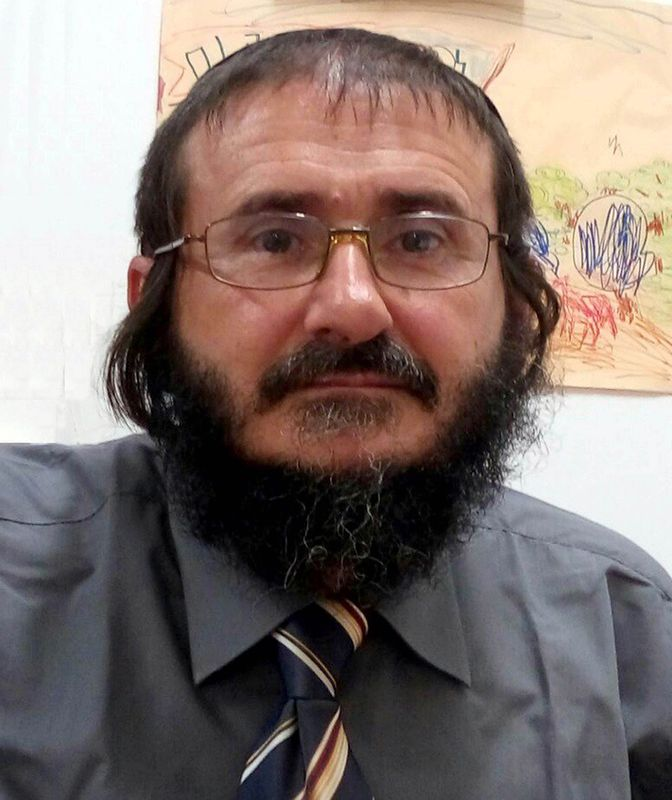
- Born: September 5, 1962; Kharkiv, Ukraine
- Education: National University of Kharkiv
- Scientific career
- Fields: Physics
- Workplaces: Ariel University

Edward Bormashenko (Hebrew: אדוארד בורמשנקו) is a professor of Materials Science and the Head of the Laboratory of Interface Science of the Ariel University in Israel. He was born in 1962 in Kharkiv, Ukraine and lives in Israel since 1997. He studied in the V. N. Karazin Kharkiv National University. His research is in the polymer science and surface science. He accomplished his PhD (supervised by Professor M. L. Friedman) in Moscow Institute of Plastics in 1990.

His scientific interests include: superhydrophobicity, superoleophobicity, creating of surfaces with prescribed properties, plasma- and UV-treatment of surfaces, plasma treatment of seeds, liquid marbles and their self-propulsion, the Moses effect (magnetically inspired deformation of liquid surfaces). Professor Bormashenko is also active in quantitative linguistics, topological problems of physics (exemplifications of the "hairy ball" theorem), advanced dimensional analysis (extensions of the Buckingham theorem), variational analysis of "free ends" physical problems, enabling application of the "transversality conditions".

In 1987 Dr. Bormashenko studied the mechanisms of destruction of ultra-thin island films by highly charged high-energy particles. In 2004 he investigated the vibrational spectrum of PVDF. In 2005-2006 he studied the breath-figures self-assembly and processes of patterning in rapidly evaporated polymer solutions. In 2006-2014 developed superhydrophobic and superoleophobic surfaces.

He is known for his pioneering research of wetting transitions, and analytical thermodynamic derivations of the Cassie and Wenzel equations using the variational calculus. In 2011-2018 spent much effort in the investigation of liquid marbles. In 2012 started to study the modification of surface properties of biological objects (seeds) with the cold plasma. In 2015-2018 studied the self-propulsion processes inspired the Marangoni flows. In 2017-2018 participated in the investigation of the droplet cluster. In 2017-2018 studied the Moses Effect (deformation of diamagnetic liquid/vapor surface with a magnetic field). He is one of the most productive and cited scientists in Ariel University. Dr. Bormashenko in 2023-2025 worked on the development of applications of the graph theory in physics. In 2025 introduced a synchronization procedure for clocks based on the Einstein–Landauer framework. Dr. Bormashenko is also known for his numerous philosophical essays (written in Russian language) in which he investigates the Jewish religious thought, Russian literature and scientific methodology. The central motif of his work is seeking the truth in the post-modern time. Bormashenko was influenced by Merab Mamardashvili and Alexander Voronel. Professor Ed. Bormashenko is married and has four daughters.
