= CDYL2 =

Protein-coding gene in humans

Available structures
PDB	Ortholog search: PDBe RCSB
PDB	List of PDB id codes 2MJ8, 4HAE, 5JJZ

Identifiers
- Aliases: CDYL2, PCCP1, chromodomain protein, Y-like 2, chromodomain Y like 2
- External IDs: MGI: 1923046; HomoloGene: 41779; GeneCards: CDYL2; OMA:CDYL2 - orthologs

Gene location (Human)
Chr.	Chromosome 16 (human)
Band	16q23.2	Start	80,597,907 bp
Band	16q23.2	End	80,804,598 bp

Gene location (Mouse)
Chr.	Chromosome 8 (mouse)
Band	8|8 E1	Start	117,301,139 bp
Band	8|8 E1	End	117,459,730 bp
RNA expression pattern
Bgee	Human / Mouse (ortholog); Top expressed in: cerebellar vermis; placenta; mucosa of ileum; middle temporal gyrus; Brodmann area 46; testicle; Brodmann area 23; pancreatic epithelial cell; jejunal mucosa; tail of epididymis / Top expressed in: blastocyst; morula; spermatid; granulocyte; embryo; zygote; right kidney; seminiferous tubule; embryo; thymus; More reference expression data
BioGPS	n/a
Gene ontology
Molecular function	catalytic activity; protein binding; methylated histone binding; transcription corepressor activity
Cellular component	nucleus
Biological process	metabolism; negative regulation of nucleic acid-templated transcription
Sources:Amigo / QuickGO
Orthologs
Species	Human	Mouse
Entrez	124359	75796
Ensembl	ENSG00000166446	ENSMUSG00000031758
UniProt	Q8N8U2	Q9D5D8
RefSeq (mRNA)	NM_152342	NM_029441
RefSeq (protein)	NP_689555	NP_083717
Location (UCSC)	Chr 16: 80.6 – 80.8 Mb	Chr 8: 117.3 – 117.46 Mb
PubMed search
- Wikidata
View/Edit Human	View/Edit Mouse

Chromodomain protein, Y-like 2 is a protein in humans that is encoded by the CDYL2 gene. It localizes to the nucleus, where it acts as a chromatin reader recognizing trimethylation of Histone H3 lysine 9 and repressing transcription.
