= Dan Meyerstein =

Israeli academic

- דן מאירשטיין
- Born: 1938 (age 87–88); Jerusalem, Mandatory Palestine
- Education: The Hebrew University of Jerusalem (M.Sc. in Physical Chemistry (1961), Ph.D. in Chemistry (1965))
- Occupation: academic
- Known for: President of Ariel University

Dan Meyerstein FRSC (Hebrew: דן מאירשטיין; born in 1938 in Jerusalem) is an Israeli academic and former president of Ariel University.

== Biography ==
Meyerstein was born in Jerusalem in Mandatory Palestine. He earned an M.Sc. from The Hebrew University of Jerusalem in Physical Chemistry (1961), and a Ph.D. in chemistry from the school as well (1965).

Meyerstein is Professor Emeritus of Ben-Gurion University of the Negev a member of the Academia Europaea, the American Chemical Society, and the Royal Society of Chemistry.

In 2004, Meyerstein opened the third annual David Bar-Illan Conference on the Media. Concerning the demographics of Israel, Meyerstein has stated that the birthrate in the Judea and Samaria District is "crazily higher than the rest of Israel."

== Views and opinions ==
On academic boycotts of Israel, Meyerstein stated in The Jerusalem Post that, "I feel that many of the people involved in this boycott have little knowledge of the system here and those that do have knowledge also have the desire to abolish the state of Israel. I have always felt boycotts were a bit like burning books. This happened in Europe 70 years ago and it is part of the reason I live in Israel".
