= Journal of Molecular Neuroscience =

- Discipline: Neuroscience
- Language: English
- Edited by: Illana Gozes

Publication details
- Former name(s): Molecular and Chemical Neuropathology, Neurochemical Pathology
- History: 1989-present
- Publisher: Humana Press
- Frequency: 9/year
- Impact factor: 3.444 (2020)

Standard abbreviations
- ISO 4: J. Mol. Neurosci.

Indexing
- CODEN: JMNEES
- ISSN: 0895-8696 (print); 1559-1166 (web)
- LCCN: 88659438
- OCLC no.: 44540143
- Neurochemical Pathology
- ISSN: 0734-600X
- Molecular and Chemical Neuropathology
- ISSN: 1044-7393

Links
- Journal homepage; Online archive

The Journal of Molecular Neuroscience is a peer-reviewed scientific journal covering research in neuroscience. It is published by Humana Press and the editor-in-chief is Illana Gozes. In 1999, the journal absorbed Molecular and Chemical Neuropathology, a journal that had been established in 1983 as Neurochemical Pathology. According to the Journal Citation Reports, the journal has a 2020 impact factor of 3.444.
