= White–Sutton syndrome =

Genetic disorder

White–Sutton syndrome (WHSUS) is a rare neurodevelopmental disorder that affects different systems of the human body. It is mainly characterized by developmental delay, intellectual disability, craniofacial abnormalities and commonly features of autism spectrum disorder (ASD).

== Presentation ==
Patients with White–Sutton syndrome might have the following symptoms:

- Developmental delay, with speech and language usually being more delayed than motor skills such as walking.
- Intellectual disability which can range from borderline normal to severe.
- Craniofacial features include microcephaly, brachycephaly, hypertelorism, midface hypoplasia (a flat or sunken appearance of the middle of the face)
- Neuropsychiatric: hyperactivity, sleeping difficulties
- Features of autism spectrum disorder and overly friendly behavior.
- Sensorineural hearing loss and visual defects (mainly farsightedness, strabismus)
- Gastrointestinal problems (e.g. poor feeding, gastroesophageal reflux, constipation)
- Obesity, short stature
- Diaphragmatic hernia

== Genetics ==
It is caused by heterozygous mutation in the POGZ gene on chromosome 1q21. The condition is inherited in an autosomal dominant pattern.

== Epidemiology ==
This condition is considered to be rare with ~50 cases reported in the literature as of 2019.

== History ==
White–Sutton syndrome is named for doctors Janson White, Ph.D. and V. Reid Sutton, M.D. In his role as a clinical researcher with the Baylor-Johns Hopkins Center for Mendelian Genomics, Sutton worked with graduate student Janson White on the description of the spectrum of developmental and health issues in individuals with variants in the POGZ gene, first detailed in White's paper, "POGZ truncating alleles cause syndromic intellectual disability" in January 2016. In June 2016, the Online Mendelian Inheritance in Man (OMIM) designated this as "White–Sutton syndrome".
