= Germline mosaicism =

Situation in which some gamete-producing cells are affected by a mutation

Germline mosaicism, also called gonadal mosaicism, is a type of genetic mosaicism where more than one set of genetic information is found specifically within the gamete cells; conversely, somatic mosaicism is a type of genetic mosaicism found in somatic cells. Germline mosaicism can be present at the same time as somatic mosaicism or individually, depending on when the conditions occur. Pure germline mosaicism refers to mosaicism found exclusively in the gametes and not in any somatic cells. Germline mosaicism can be caused either by a mutation that occurs after conception, or by epigenetic regulation, alterations to DNA such as methylation that do not involve changes in the DNA coding sequence.

A mutation in an allele acquired by a somatic cell early in its development can be passed on to its daughter cells, including those that later specialize to gametes. With such mutation within the gamete cells, a pair of medically typical individuals may have repeated succession of children with certain genetic disorders such as Duchenne muscular dystrophy and osteogenesis imperfecta because of germline mosaicism. It is possible for parents unaffected by germline mutations to produce an offspring with an autosomal dominant (AD) disorder due to a random new mutation within one’s gamete cells known as sporadic mutation; however, if these parents produce more than one child with an AD disorder, germline mosaicism is more likely the cause than a sporadic mutation. In the first documented case of its kind, two offspring of a French woman who had no phenotypic expression of the AD disorder hypertrophic cardiomyopathy, inherited the disease.

== Inheritance ==
Germline mosaicism disorders are usually inherited in a pattern that suggests that the condition is dominant in either or both of the parents. That said, diverging from Mendelian gene inheritance patterns, a parent with a recessive allele can produce offspring expressing the phenotype as dominant through germline mosaicism. A situation may also arise in which the parents have milder phenotypic expression of a mutation yet produce offspring with more expressive phenotypic variance and a more frequent sibling recurrences of the mutation.

Diseases caused by germline mosaicism can be difficult to diagnose as genetically-inherited because the mutant alleles are not likely to be present in the somatic cells. Somatic cells are more commonly used for genetic analysis because they are easier to obtain than gametes. If the disease is a result of pure germline mosaicism, then the disease causing mutant allele would never be present in the somatic cells. This is a source of uncertainty for genetic counselling. An individual may still be a carrier for a certain disease even if the disease causing mutant allele is not present in the cells that were analyzed because the causative mutation could still exist in some of the individual's gametes.

Germline mosaicism may contribute to the inheritance of many genetic conditions. Conditions that are inherited by means of germline mosaicism are often mistaken as being the result of de novo mutations. Various diseases are now being re-examined for presence of mutant alleles in the germline of the parents in order to further our understanding of how they can be passed on. The frequency of germline mosaicism is not known due to the sporadic nature of the mutations causing it and the difficulty in obtaining the gametes that must be tested to diagnose it.

== Diagnosis ==
Autosomal dominant or X-linked familial disorders often prompt prenatal testing for germline mosaicism. This diagnosis may involve minimally invasive procedures, such as blood sampling or amniotic fluid sampling. Collected samples can be sequenced via common DNA testing methods, such as Sanger Sequencing, MLPA, or Southern Blot analysis, to look for variations on relevant genes connected to the disorder.

== Recurrence rate ==
The recurrence rate of conditions caused by germline mosaicism varies greatly between subjects. Recurrence is proportional to the number of gamete cells that carry the particular mutation with the condition. If the mutation occurred earlier on in the development of the gamete cells, then the recurrence rate would be higher because a greater number of cells would carry the mutant allele.

== Case studies ==
A Moroccan family consisting of two healthy unrelated parents and three offspring—including two with Noonan syndrome, a rare autosomal dominant disorder with varying expression and genetic heterogeneity—underwent genetic testing revealing that both of the siblings with NS share the same PTPN11 haplotype from both parents, while a distinct paternal and maternal haplotype was inherited by the unaffected sibling. In the paper "Germline and somatic mosaicism in transgenic mice" published in 1986, Thomas M.Wilkie, Ralph L.Brinster, and Richard D.Palmiter analyzed a germline mosaicism experiment done on 262 transgenic mice and concluded that 30% of founder transgenic mice are mosaic in the germline.
