= POGZ =

Protein-coding gene in humans

Identifiers
- Aliases: POGZ, ZNF280E, ZNF635, ZNF635m, MRD37, WHSUS, pogo transposable element with ZNF domain, pogo transposable element derived with ZNF domain
- External IDs: OMIM: 614787; MGI: 2442117; GeneCards: POGZ
Available structures
PDB	Ortholog search: PDBe RCSB
PDB	List of PDB id codes 2E72, 2N3A

Gene location (Human)
Chr.	Chromosome 1 (human)
Band	1q21.3	Start	151,402,724 bp
Band	1q21.3	End	151,459,494 bp

Gene location (Mouse)
Chr.	Chromosome 3 (mouse)
Band	3|3 F2.1	Start	94,744,878 bp
Band	3|3 F2.1	End	94,789,637 bp
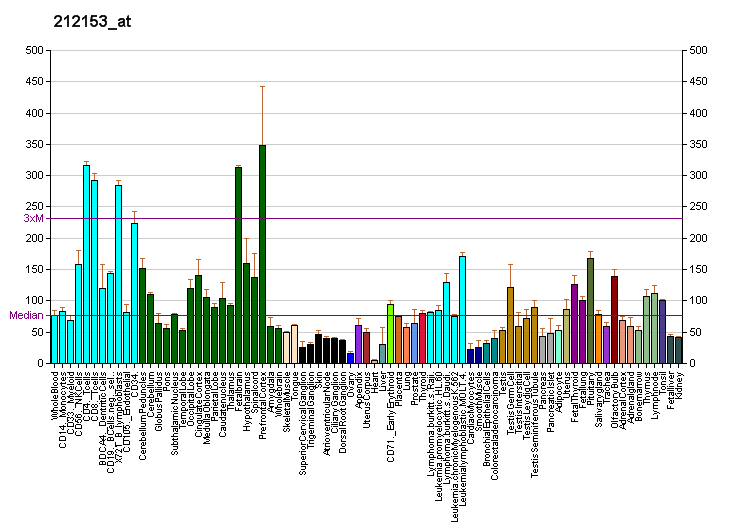
RNA expression pattern
Bgee	Human / Mouse (ortholog); Top expressed in: right uterine tube; right hemisphere of cerebellum; buccal mucosa cell; sural nerve; left ovary; pituitary gland; right ovary; anterior pituitary; ganglionic eminence; right lobe of thyroid gland / Top expressed in: tail of embryo; Gonadal ridge; genital tubercle; otic vesicle; hand; Rostral migratory stream; cumulus cell; ciliary body; primitive streak; iris; More reference expression data
BioGPS	More reference expression data
Gene ontology
Molecular function	nucleic acid binding; DNA binding; protein binding; metal ion binding; DNA-binding transcription factor activity, RNA polymerase II-specific; RNA polymerase II core promoter sequence-specific DNA binding
Cellular component	cytoplasm; chromosome; nucleus; nucleoplasm; cytosol; histone methyltransferase complex
Biological process	kinetochore assembly; cell cycle; mitotic sister chromatid cohesion; cell division; regulation of transcription by RNA polymerase II; regulation of gene expression
Sources:Amigo / QuickGO
Orthologs
Databases	NCBI: entry; OMA: entry
Species	Human	Mouse
Entrez	23126	229584
Ensembl	ENSG00000143442	ENSMUSG00000038902
UniProt	Q7Z3K3	Q8BZH4
RefSeq (mRNA)	NM_001194937; NM_001194938; NM_015100; NM_145796; NM_207171	NM_001165948; NM_172683; NM_001368811; NM_001368812
RefSeq (protein)	NP_001181866; NP_001181867; NP_055915; NP_665739; NP_997054	NP_001159420; NP_766271; NP_001355740; NP_001355741
Location (UCSC)	Chr 1: 151.4 – 151.46 Mb	Chr 3: 94.74 – 94.79 Mb
PubMed search
- Wikidata
View/Edit Human	View/Edit Mouse

Pogo transposable element with ZNF domain is a protein that in humans is encoded by the POGZ gene.

The protein encoded by this gene appears to be a zinc finger protein containing a transposase domain at the C-terminus.

This protein was found to interact with the transcription factor SP1 in a yeast two-hybrid system. At least three alternatively spliced transcript variants encoding distinct isoforms have been observed.

The CHAMP1 protein complex consisting of CHAMP1, POGZ and HPIα promotes heterochromatin assembly at multiple chromosomal sites, and also promotes homology-directed DNA repair of DNA double-strand breaks in these regions.

== Clinical significance ==
Heterozygous mutation of POGZ causes White–Sutton syndrome.
