= ADNP (gene) =

Protein-coding gene in humans

Identifiers
- Aliases: ADNP, ADNP1, MRD28, HVDAS, activity-dependent neuroprotector homeobox, activity dependent neuroprotector homeobox
- External IDs: OMIM: 611386; MGI: 1338758; GeneCards: ADNP

Gene location (Human)
Chr.	Chromosome 20 (human)
Band	20q13.13	Start	50,888,916 bp
Band	20q13.13	End	50,931,437 bp

Gene location (Mouse)
Chr.	Chromosome 2 (mouse)
Band	2|2 H3	Start	168,022,906 bp
Band	2|2 H3	End	168,049,032 bp
RNA expression pattern
Bgee	Human / Mouse (ortholog); Top expressed in: ganglionic eminence; ventricular zone; testicle; germinal epithelium; corpus epididymis; tail of epididymis; caput epididymis; palpebral conjunctiva; skin of hip; skin of thigh / Top expressed in: tail of embryo; genital tubercle; ganglionic eminence; spermatocyte; spermatid; neural layer of retina; ventricular zone; uterus; Cortex of frontal lobe; primary visual cortex; More reference expression data
BioGPS	n/a
Gene ontology
Molecular function	DNA binding; peptide binding; chromatin binding; metal ion binding; protein binding; copper ion binding; nucleic acid binding; DNA-binding transcription factor activity, RNA polymerase II-specific; beta-tubulin binding
Cellular component	cytoplasm; axon; soma; dendrite; nucleus; extracellular space
Biological process	cellular response to extracellular stimulus; negative regulation of neuron apoptotic process; regulation of protein ADP-ribosylation; regulation of transcription, DNA-templated; estrous cycle; nitric oxide homeostasis; negative regulation of synaptic transmission; negative regulation of protein binding; negative regulation of gene expression; transcription, DNA-templated; short-term memory; response to inorganic substance; positive regulation of neuron projection development; positive regulation of peptidyl-tyrosine phosphorylation; positive regulation of axon extension; response to carbohydrate; activation of protein kinase activity; positive regulation of synapse assembly; regulation of transcription by RNA polymerase II; cGMP-mediated signaling
Sources:Amigo / QuickGO
Orthologs
Databases	NCBI: entry; OMA: entry
Species	Human	Mouse
Entrez	23394	11538
Ensembl	ENSG00000101126	ENSMUSG00000051149
UniProt	Q9H2P0	Q9Z103
RefSeq (mRNA)	NM_001282531; NM_001282532; NM_015339; NM_181442; NM_001347511	NM_009628; NM_001310086; NM_001310088
RefSeq (protein)	NP_001269460; NP_001269461; NP_001334440; NP_056154; NP_852107	NP_001297015; NP_001297017; NP_033758
Location (UCSC)	Chr 20: 50.89 – 50.93 Mb	Chr 2: 168.02 – 168.05 Mb
PubMed search
- Wikidata
View/Edit Human	View/Edit Mouse

Activity-dependent neuroprotector homeobox is a protein that in humans is encoded by the ADNP gene.

== Function ==
Vasoactive intestinal peptide is a neuroprotective factor that has a stimulatory effect on the growth of some tumor cells and an inhibitory effect on others. This gene encodes a protein that is upregulated by vasoactive intestinal peptide and may be involved in its stimulatory effect on certain tumor cells. The encoded protein contains one homeobox and nine zinc finger domains, suggesting that it functions as a transcription factor. This gene is also upregulated in normal proliferative tissues. Finally, the encoded protein may increase the viability of certain cell types through modulation of p53 activity. Alternatively spliced transcript variants encoding the same protein have been described.

== Clinical significance ==
Mutations in ADNP are the cause of ADNP syndrome. Although it is unclear how mutations in the ADNP gene affect ADNP protein function, researchers suggest that the mutations result in abnormal chromatin remodeling. Disturbance of this process alters the activity of many genes and disrupts development or function of several of the body's tissues and organs, including the brain.
