= Ariel University =

University in the occupied West Bank

- אוניברסיטת אריאל בשומרון
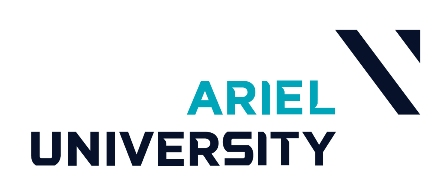
- Hecht Library, located at the center of campus
- Type: Public
- Established: 1982
- President: Ehud Grossman
- Rector: Albert Pinhasov
- Students: 17,000 (as of 2025)
- Location: Ariel, Judea and Samaria Area; 32°06′17″N 35°12′34″E Building details
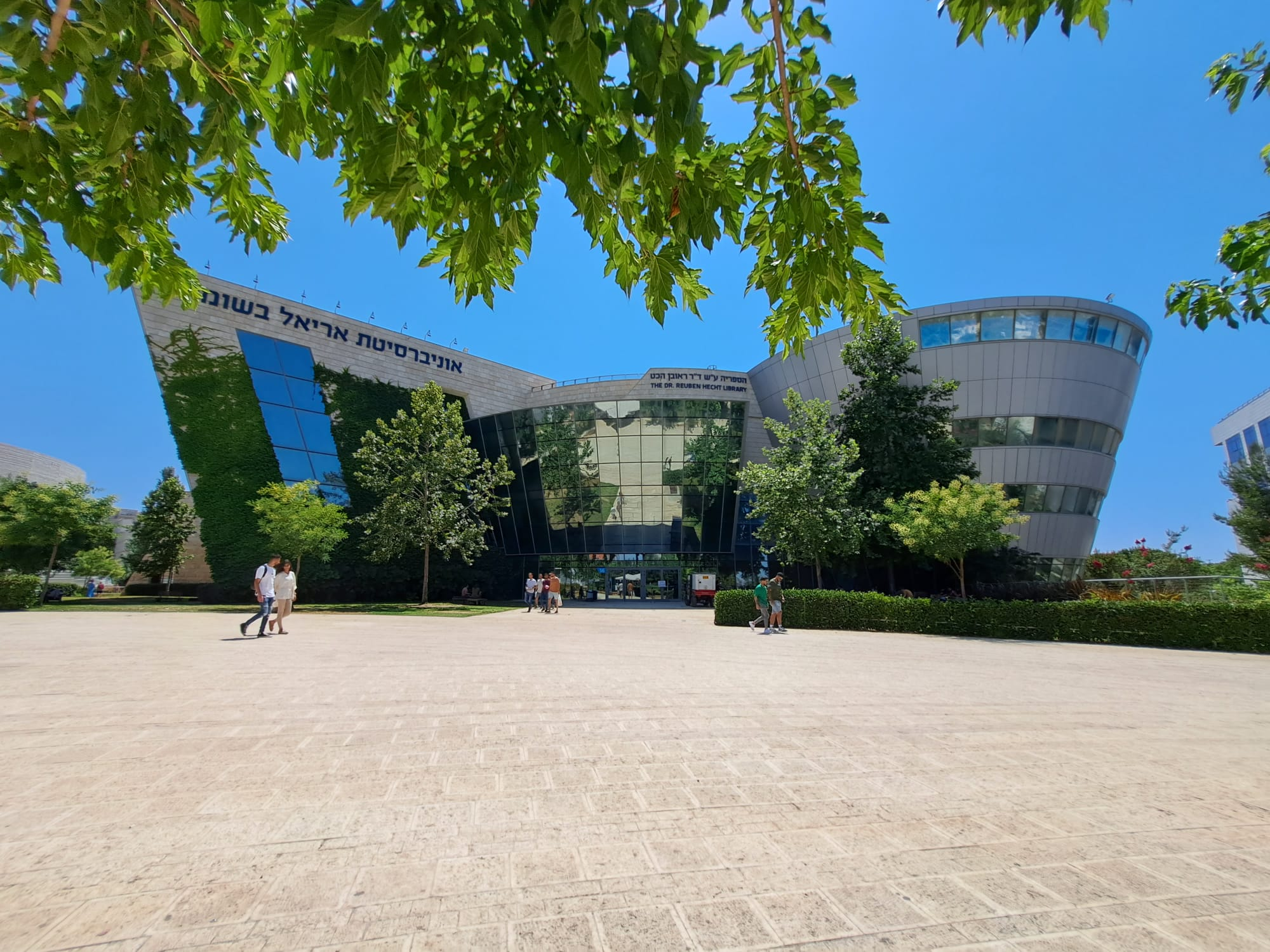
- Hecht Library, located at the center of campus
- Campus: urban
- Colors: Teal, navy blue, and white
- Website: English; Hebrew

Ariel University (Hebrew: אוניברסיטת אריאל), previously a public college known as the Ariel University Center of Samaria, is an Israeli university located in the urban Israeli settlement of Ariel in the West Bank.

The college was founded in 1982 as a regional branch of Bar-Ilan University and was originally located in the settlement of Kedumim, After moving to a larger campus in Ariel, it became the largest Israeli public college. In 2004–2005, the affiliation with Bar-Ilan ended and it became an independent college.

On 17 July 2012, the Council for Higher Education in Judea and Samaria voted to grant the institution full university status. This move was praised by the Prime Minister Benjamin Netanyahu, Minister of Education Gideon Saar, Foreign Minister Avigdor Lieberman and some Knesset members as well as Nobel Prize in Economics winning mathematician Robert Aumann. The Council of presidents of Israeli Universities condemned the move. A survey in 2013 found that 65% of the public in Israel supported the recognition of Ariel University as Israel's eighth university.

Ariel University has 26 departments for B.A., BSc and BArch studies, in three faculties and three schools. In addition, Ariel University offers a master's degree programs for M.A., M.B.A. and MSc in 2014, Ariel University initiated a PhD programs for Doctorate studies also. In 2011, it had a student population of 14,000, with a branch in Tel Aviv. All degrees are recognized by the Council for Higher Education in Israel.

The university and its staff have been the target of boycotts in Israel and overseas for its location in the Israeli-occupied West Bank.

== University status ==
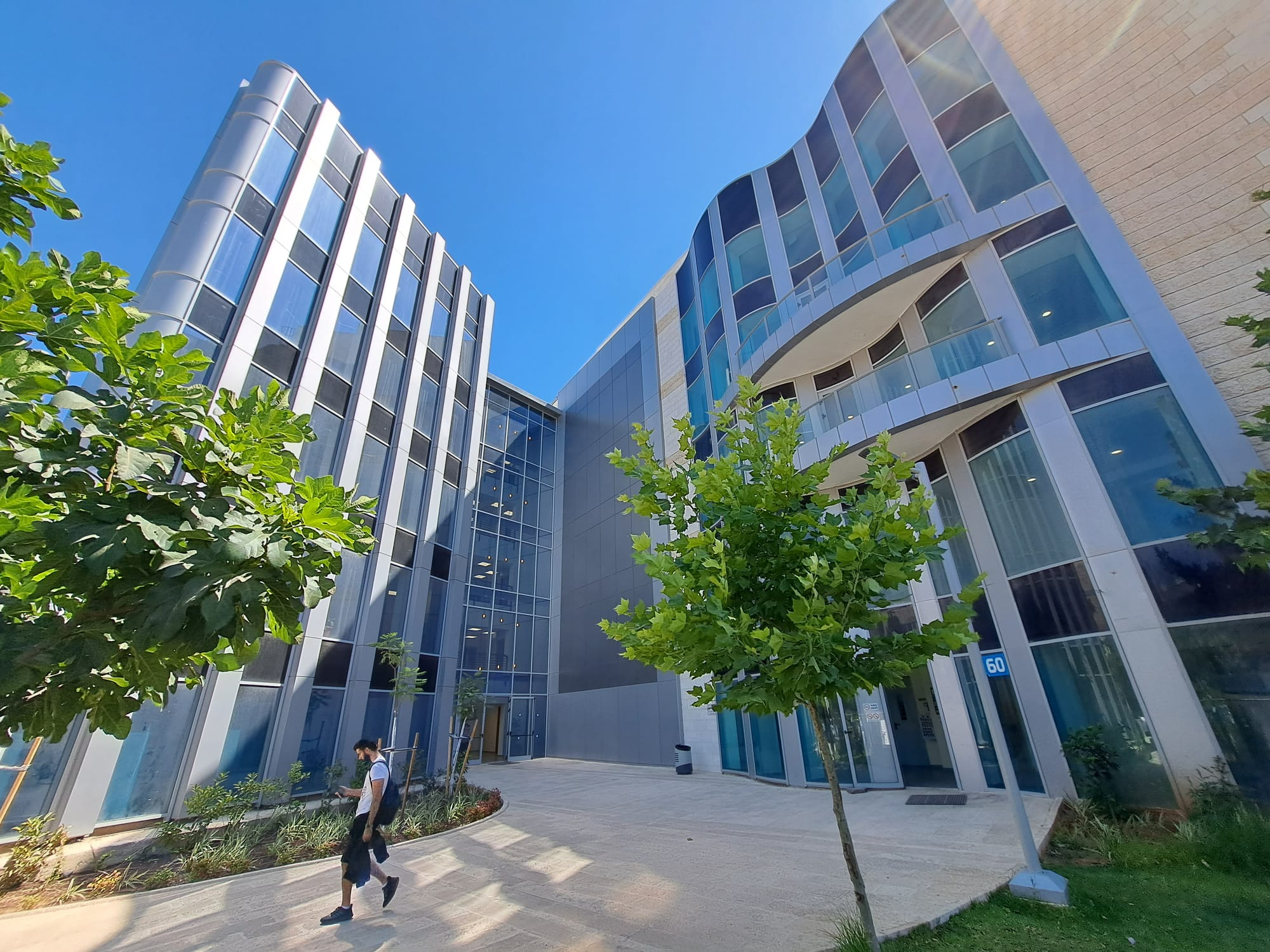
Social Sciences and Humanities building

In 2005, the Israeli government supported upgrading the college to university status. The change of status was not immediate since the Council for Higher Education in Israel must approve such changes. In July 2006, the Council rejected a proposal to merge several regional colleges in the Galilee. Based on the findings of a committee appointed by the council, it was decided not to approve the establishment of any new universities in Israel for the next five years.

Upgrading the college to university status was controversial. Settlements such as Ariel are considered illegal under international law by the international community, and Palestinians see them as an obstacle to peace, but the Israeli government disputes this. British Foreign Office minister Alistair Burt also said he was disappointed in the decision and called on Israel to reverse the decision.

In August 2007, the college was renamed the "Ariel University Center of Samaria." Although Prime Minister Ehud Olmert endorsed the change, both Minister of Education Yuli Tamir and the Council for Higher Education objected, with the latter announcing in 2008 that they would not recognise degrees awarded by the college. The name change was recognised in 2010, although the college remained without university accreditation until July 2012.

On 24 December 2012, Israeli Defense Minister Ehud Barak ordered the Central Command to officially recognize the upgrade of Ariel University to a fully accredited institution of higher learning.

On 12 February 2018, the Knesset passed legislation placing Israeli colleges in Judea and Samaria under the direct authority of Israel's higher education establishment, ending a long-standing distinction between schools in and outside of pre-1967 Israel. Under the new law, the separate higher education council for Judea and Samaria was abolished, and all Israeli colleges operating in Judea and Samaria were placed under the supervision of the Council for Higher Education in Israel.

== Students and faculty ==
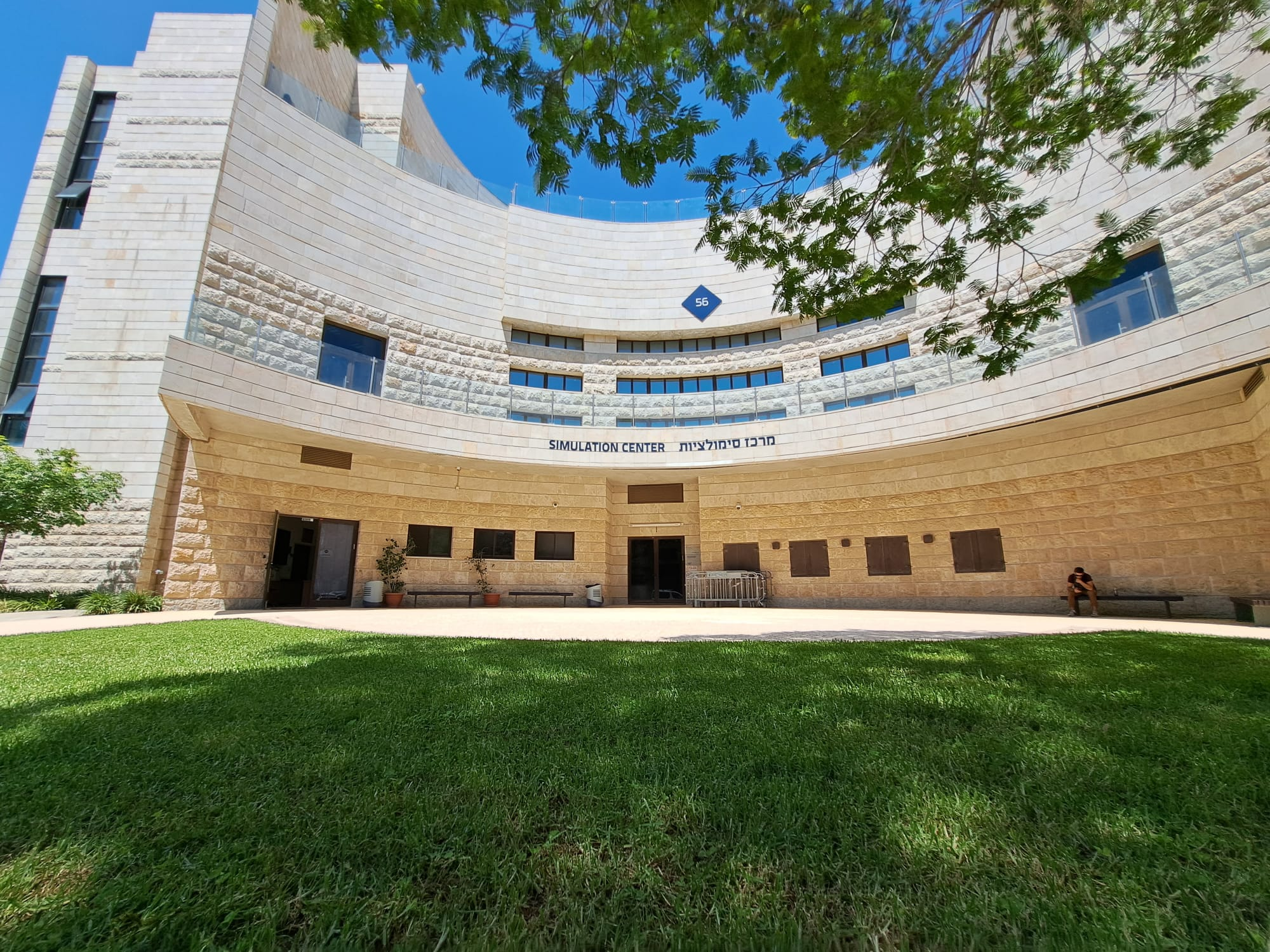
Medical Simulation Center

In 2025, the university had 17,000 students, including Jewish (both secular and Orthodox), Arab, Druze, and Circassian Israeli students. In 2015, it had the largest number of Ethiopian-born students of any Israeli university. In 2011, there were 600 Arab-Israeli students. In a report in January 2014, Arab students said they did not feel racially or politically motivated discrimination at the university. In 2012, Haaretz newspaper reported that there were also faculty members with left-wing views teaching at the university. In 2024-2025, 10 percent of the student population was Arab.

== Visiting lecturers ==
AUC hosts visiting lecturers from universities around the world. In 2010 University of Hartford communications professor Don Ellis taught the course "Communication Issues and Political Conflict." He said: "My only goal is to help them improve their critical thinking skills. I don't expect that either side will acknowledge the other side as being right." British professor Geoffrey Alderman is also a guest lecturer at Ariel University, and has said that those British members of parliament who oppose the university, did so because the university "is Jewish. If it was a Palestinian university they wouldn’t object. For heaven’s sake, this is an educational establishment with many Palestinian as well as Jewish students."

Professor Hilde Leone of Leibniz University, Hanover, was a guest lecturer at the university's school of architecture, speaking about "Between Vision and Reality."

== International cooperation and programs ==
Ariel University Center has signed academic cooperation agreements with over 51 higher education institutions around the world, including the United States, Russia, France, Germany, Brazil, Portugal, Costa Rica, Ecuador, Argentina, Turkey, Poland, Ukraine, Georgia, Kazakhstan, Taiwan and Armenia. There is a partnership between the University of Toronto and the Ariel University on the master's degree in Business Administration (MBA).

In 2008, the Global Association of Risk Professionals established a branch in the University Center which conducts operator courses and international conferences in university center.

In 2011, Ariel University Center and Ural Federal University signed a cooperation agreement with the Skolkovo innovation center, a high technology business area near Moscow. The agreement is intended to provide Israeli companies with access to capital resources and manpower.

Ariel University participates in the project Masa Israel Journey in which Jewish students all over the world come for the time between a semester to a year study in Ariel, about 30% of students coming to study in Ariel immigrate to Israel at the end of the project.

Due to its location in Israeli-occupied territory, Ariel University was excluded from receiving funding as part of the Horizon 2020 research program signed between the EU and Israel in 2013.

== Academic boycotts ==
In April 2005, the British Association of University Teachers (AUT) briefly boycotted Bar-Ilan University for its academic links with the college. The boycott was rescinded in May 2005.

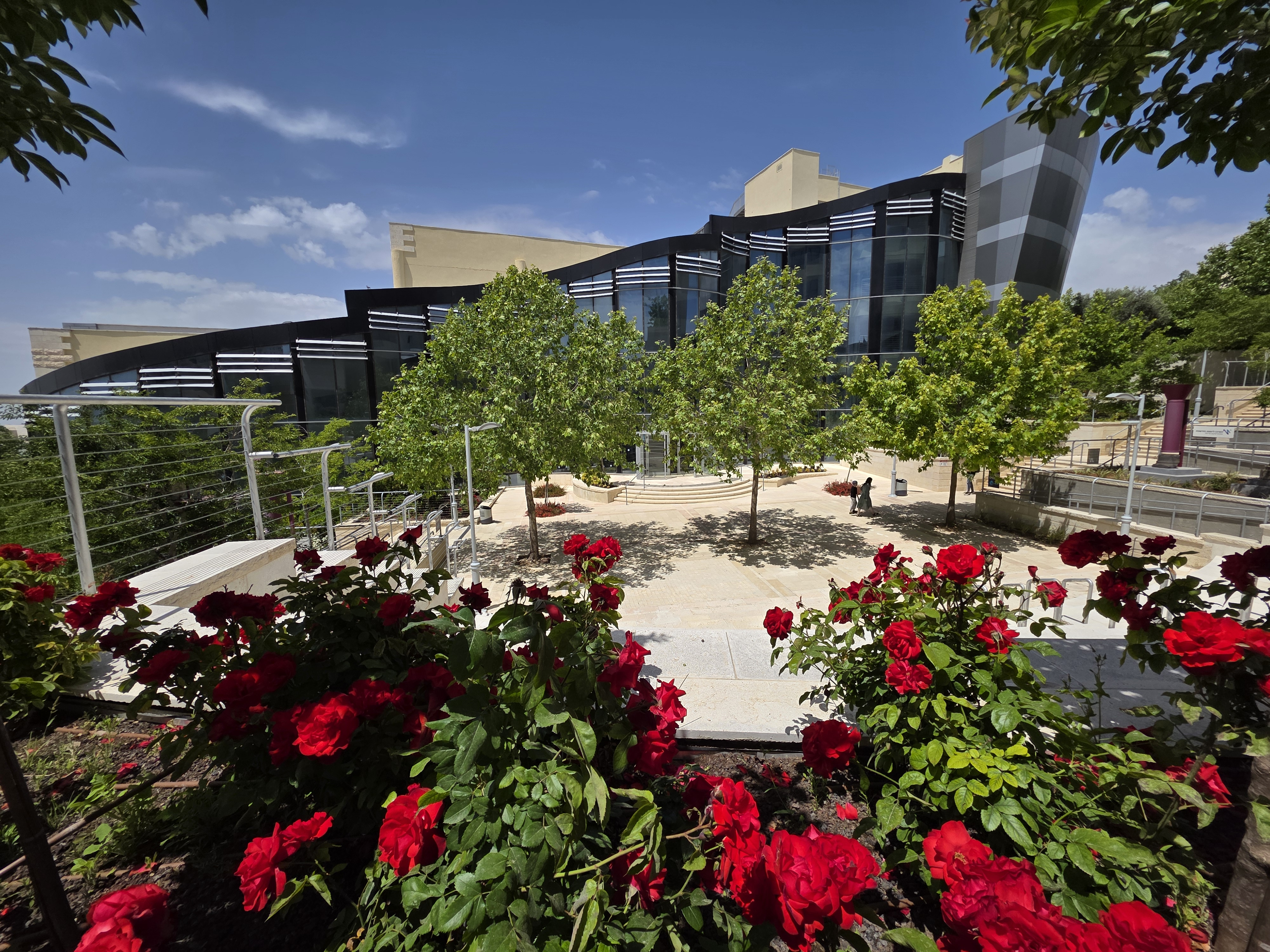
Faculty of Natural Sciences building

In 2009, the Spanish Housing Ministry disqualified the university from taking part in an international architectural competition in 2009. The Spanish government explained that their decision to ban the university was a result of it being located in Palestinian occupied territories. The Anti-Defamation League asked the Spanish Government and the US Department of Energy to overturn the disqualification of Israeli researchers from an international solar energy competition in Madrid.

In early 2011, 165 Israeli academics announced they were boycotting the university to protest Israeli settlement expansion. They wrote in their petition, "Ariel is not part of the sovereign territory of Israel, and we therefore cannot be required to go there."

Due to Ariel University's location in a settlement, it is excluded from receiving funds from the EU and the German-Israeli Foundation for Scientific Research and Development. In 2018, prominent international physicists, including David Gross, Martin Rees and Ed Witten, published an open letter calling for fellow academics not to attend a conference at Ariel University, and not to participate in "attempts to normalise the occupation of Palestinian territories".

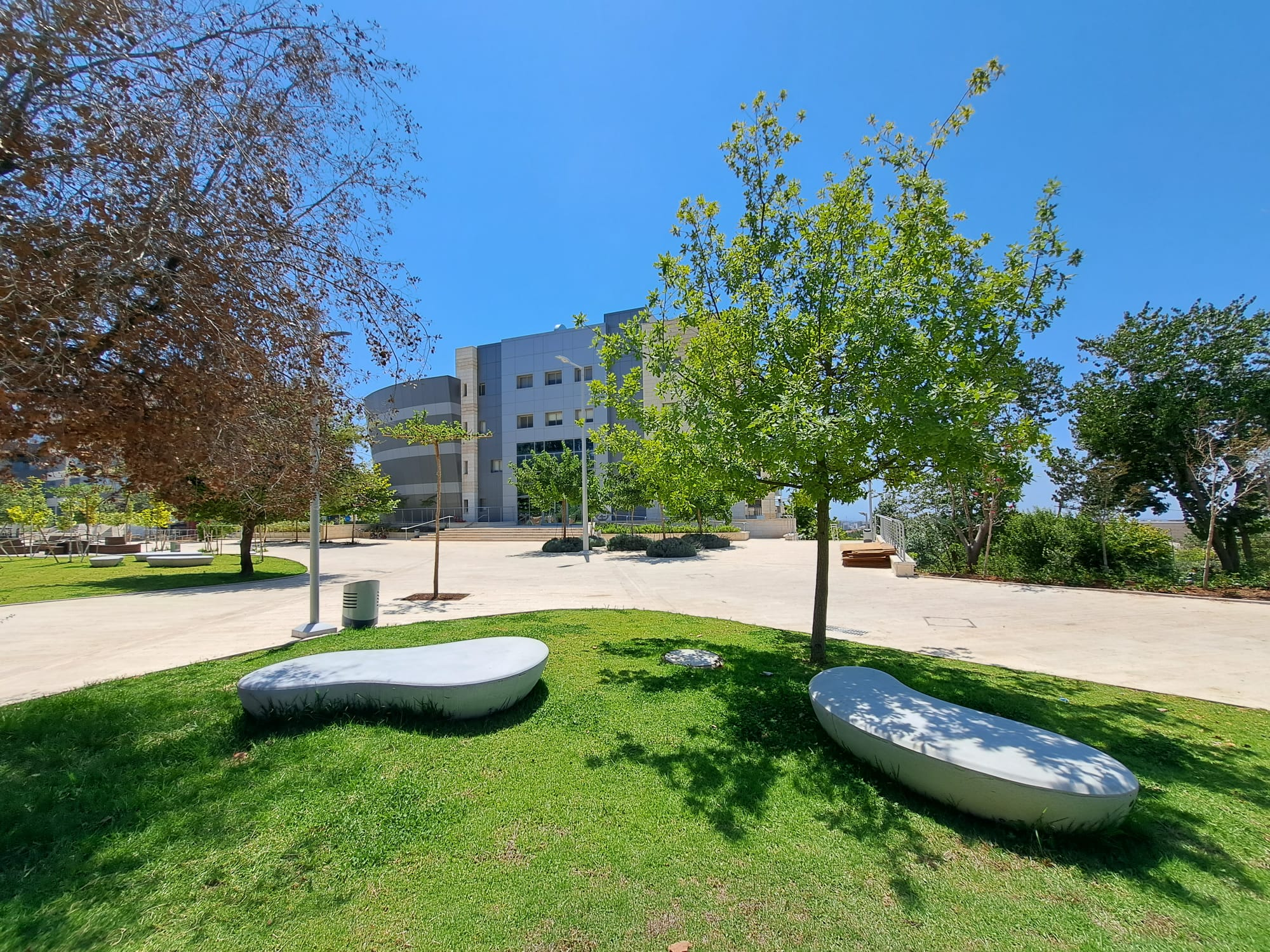
View from campus commons, showing classrooms and administrative offices in the background

== Notable faculty ==
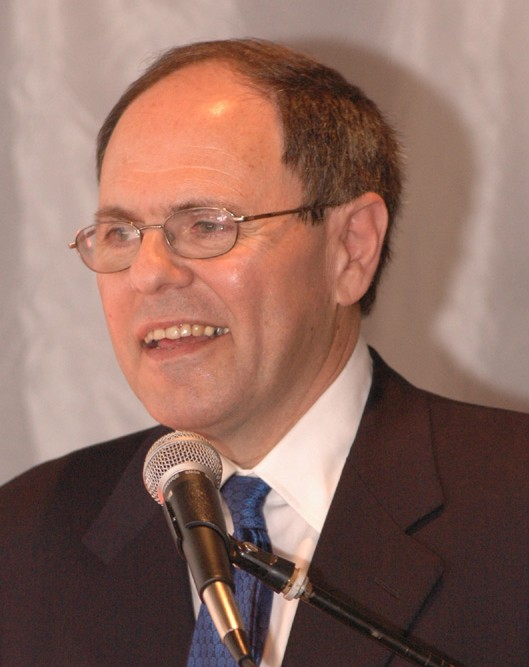
Dani Dayan

- Mel Alexenberg (born 1937), artist
- Edward Bormashenko (born 1962), Head of the Laboratory of Polymers
- Dani Dayan (born 1955), Chairman of the Yesha Council and lecturer at Ariel
- Israel Hanukoglu, Professor of biochemistry and molecular biology and former Science and Technology Adviser to the Prime Minister of Israel
- Ram Karmi (1931–2013), architect
- Dan Meyerstein (born 1938), former president of university

== See also ==
- Education in Israel
- List of Israeli universities and colleges
- Samaria
