= THAP4 =

Protein-coding gene in the species Homo sapiens

Identifiers
- Aliases: THAP4, PP238, CGI-36, THAP domain containing 4, Nb(III)
- External IDs: OMIM: 612533; MGI: 1914276; GeneCards: THAP4
Available structures
PDB	Ortholog search: PDBe RCSB
PDB	List of PDB id codes 3IA8

Gene location (Human)
Chr.	Chromosome 2 (human)
Band	2q37.3	Start	241,584,405 bp
Band	2q37.3	End	241,637,158 bp

Gene location (Mouse)
Chr.	Chromosome 1 (mouse)
Band	1|1 D	Start	93,629,657 bp
Band	1|1 D	End	93,682,586 bp
RNA expression pattern
Bgee	Human / Mouse (ortholog); Top expressed in: apex of heart; mucosa of transverse colon; right auricle of heart; muscle of thigh; left ventricle; gastrocnemius muscle; human kidney; renal medulla; putamen; caudate nucleus / Top expressed in: seminiferous tubule; spermatocyte; choroid plexus of fourth ventricle; epithelium of stomach; spermatid; right kidney; tail of embryo; human kidney; large intestine; left colon; More reference expression data
BioGPS	n/a
Gene ontology
Molecular function	metal ion binding; DNA binding; nucleic acid binding; heme binding; protein homodimerization activity; DNA-binding transcription factor activity, RNA polymerase II-specific
Cellular component	cellular component
Biological process	biological process; regulation of transcription by RNA polymerase II
Sources:Amigo / QuickGO
Orthologs
Databases	NCBI: entry; OMA: entry
Species	Human	Mouse
Entrez	51078	67026
Ensembl	ENSG00000176946	ENSMUSG00000026279
UniProt	Q8WY91	Q6P3Z3
RefSeq (mRNA)	NM_001164356; NM_015963	NM_025920; NM_001310761
RefSeq (protein)	NP_001157828; NP_057047	NP_001297690; NP_080196
Location (UCSC)	Chr 2: 241.58 – 241.64 Mb	Chr 1: 93.63 – 93.68 Mb
PubMed search
- Wikidata
View/Edit Human	View/Edit Mouse

THAP domain-containing protein 4 is a protein that in humans is encoded by the THAP4 gene. It is one of twelve known members of the thanatos-associated protein (THAP) family of proteins. Members of this family share a conserved N-terminal THAP domain as well as a conserved zinc-binding module that likely mediates DNA binding. THAP4 also has a structurally distinct C-terminal region that binds heme, which is unique among human THAP proteins.

THAP4 is considered a distinctive member of the THAP protein family because its C-terminal domain is able to bind heme. It thus may be a potential signaling-responsive regulatory protein, likely sensitive to nitric oxide (NO), however its exact biological targets and regulatory roles remain to be experimentally observed.

== Structure ==
THAP4 is a 577 amino acid protein that contains two distinct regions within its structure: the N-terminal and the C-terminal. The N-terminal region includes the THAP domain as well as a C2CH-type zinc binding module shared across the THAP protein family. This domain is about 90 residues long and is thought to help sequence specific DNA interactions based on biochemical studies related to THAP proteins.

The THAP domain itself displays a conserved architecture build around coordinated zinc atoms that stabilize its fold. Key residues within the C2CH motif serve as ligands for zinc, allowing the domain to maintain the conformation needed for accurate DNA recognition. Structural studies of other THAP proteins such as THAP1, indicate that the THAP domain often binds to short, specific DNA sequences and may participate in regulating genes associated with cell cycle progression and apoptosis. Though direct biochemical evidence for THAP4's DNA targets are not yet available, the high conservation of the THAP domain strongly suggests that the THAP4 gene retains the DNA- binding properties seen in related proteins.

The C-Terminal region of THAP4 forms a compact β-barrel structure capable of binding a heme molecule. Structural analysis shows that the heme is positioned within a hydrophobic pocket and is coordinated by a conserved histidine residue (His567). This region closely resembles plant nitrobinnin proteins, which also bind heme, and the THAP4 C-terminal domain forms a dimer similar to nitrobinnin in crystallographic studies. Because none of the other human THAP proteins have this type of domain, THAP4 is the only known member of the family to bind to a cofactor like this.

The structure of the β-barrel in the C-terminal region creates an environment for heme stabilization, and the positioning of His567 as the axial ligand to the heme iron shows parallels with other heme binding proteins involved in redox regulation and gaseous ligands sensing. In the crystal structure, two THAP4 C-terminal units associate to form a dimer, with the heme binding pockets oriented in a way that may facilitate cooperative ligand binding or structural communication between the two subunits. This dimeric organization of THAP4 mirrors the behavior of nitrobinnin, a plant protein known to bind nitric oxide (NO), and strengthens the hypothesis that THAP4 could interact with NO or related molecules under physiological conditions. Residues forming the heme binding cavity include hydrophobic pocket residues and histidine ligands. In cross species alignments, these residues are conserved across Vertebrate THAP4 orthologs. This gives evidence to heme binding being a critical property of the protein.

In addition to its heme binding ability, this domain exhibits several conserved surface residues that may interact with other protain or nucleic acids, though no direct binding partners have been experimentally identified. The presence of both hydrophobic and hydrophillic surface patches shows how a potential for regulated protein-protein interaction which could possibly have an effect on THAP4's activity in response to cellular conditions such as redox changes or oxidative stress.

== Function ==
The full biochemical role of THAP4 has not yet been fully established, but based on its structure there are several functional possibilities that can be inferred. The N-terminal THAP domain suggests a capacity for DNA binding involvement in transcriptional regulation, which has been observed in other members of the THAP protein family. This is because this domain has been experimentally shown in other THAP proteins (like THAP1) to bind to specific DNA motifs in a zinc-dependent manner.

Because THAP domains in other similar proteins frequently participate in the regulation of genes linked to proliferation, apoptosis and cellular stress responses, it would be understandable that THAP4 could act in one or more of these pathways as well. THAP proteins in general have been implicated in controlling transcription either by directly binding to promoter regions or by interactions with larger chromatin modifying complexes. Given THAP4's domain structure and expression profile, its potential regulatory role may be particularly relevant in tissues with high metabolic or developmental activity, such as the testis, where this protein is strongly expressed

The C-terminal heme-binding domain implies that THAP4 could respond to heme associated or oxidative signals. The structural similarity of this domain to nitromindin, which is a knows NO binding protein, implies a possibility that THAP4 could participate in sensing or responding to nitric oxide or other smaller reactive molecules.

In addition to nitric oxide, heme binding proteins are often responsive to changes in cellular redox states and oxidative stress. This could show how THAP4 acts as a molecular sensor that relays environmental or metabolic cues to the nucleus. If ligand binding or redox changes influence the conformation of the THAP domain, THAP4 could function as a conditional transcription factor whose DNA binding/ regulatory activity changed depending on the cellular oxidative state. Although this remains to be tested, dual domain regulatory proteins like this are well documented in similar protein families and provide a compelling model for THAP4's biological role.

A leading hypothesis is that the heme-binding region provides a path by which THAP4 may act as a redox sensitive/nitric oxide regulatory factor which could combine ligand binding to the regulatory activity of the THAP domain. However as of right now, no direct DNA-binding targets or signaling pathways directly involving THAP4 have been experimentally confirmed.

Further functional speculation also arises from THAP4's conserved expression patterns. In mammals, THAP4 expression is detectable in many tissues but is enriched in the testis which is a tissue that undergoes rapid cellular turnover and redox fluctuations during spermatogenesis. These conditions could make THAP4 an important modulator of stress responses or developmental signal in germ cells. Similarly, The observed up regulation of the THAP4 under heat shock conditions in some cells suggests that THAP4 could play a role in coordinating transcriptional responses to acute cellular stress, by essentially acting as a downstream mediator of heat induced metabolic changes that affect heme or redox balance.

== Expression ==
Studies in rodent and expression surveys in humans show that THAP4 is broadly expressed in testis with detectable levels found in many somatic tissues. Also, in some experimental settings, THAP4 expression has been observed to increase when under heat shock conditions as well as certain stress related cellular states, although the exact physiological significance of this regulation has not been officially characterized.

More specifically, rodent studies indicate that THAP4 mRNA is strongly expressed in the testis during postnatal development, a period where extensive germ-cell proliferation and differentiation take place. Expression is also detectable in organs such as the heart, liver and thymus but at much lower levels. The widespread but variable expression pattern shows that THAP4 likely performs a generalized cellular function that may be modulated in a tissue-specific manner. In the testis, high expression could reflect involvement in germ-cell maintenance or Sertoil cell biology whereas in stress conditions such as heat shock, the elevated expression may reflect a protective or adaptive cellular response.

Additionally, the heme binding domain resembles proteins involved in nitrogen oxide signaling and because of this, THAP4 expression levels could potentially fluctuate in conditions associated with inflammation and impaired mitochondrial function, though this has not been experimentally documented. Future transcriptomic and proteomic studies may clarify the extent to which THAP4 expression is responsive to environmental or metabolic stimuli.

== Model organisms ==
A spontaneous rat mutant known at pet/pet or petit carries a 2 bp deletion in exon 2 of the THAP4 gene. This mutation subsequently produces a frameshift leading to premature termination of the THAP4 protein. this eliminated most of the C-terminal region including the heme binding domain. Rats that have this mutation have been found to have dwarfism which is apparent at birth and usually fatal. Along with this, testicular defects like smaller testes and seminiferous tubule degeneration have been found. Another defect that can arise form this mutation is a reduced thymus size or thymic hypoplasia. Because of this is shows that THAP4 is at least partially responsible for postnatal growth, normal testis development and thymus size in rats.

In addition to these phenotypes, affected rats displayed variable survival rates depending on genetic background, which could suggest that THAP4 function may interact with modifier genes or stress-related pathways. Histological analysis revealed that seminiferous tubles in mutant rats often lacked germ cells entirely. Instead, they contained Sertoil cells which resembles Sertoil cell only syndrome (SCOS) in humans. Other tubules displayed partial spermatogenesis but were reduced in diameter which indicates the structural integrity of the tubules were compromised. Thymic hypoplasia was associated with increased apoptosis and pathways in developing immune tissues. Collectively, these findings demonstrate a broad requirement for THAP4 in supporting normal growth and immune organ development in rats.

Mouse knockout models are genetically engineered animals in which a gene has been inactivated or "knocked out" to study its function. This model was applied to the THAP4 gene in order to study its effect on different model organisms. Deletion of exon2 of the mouseTHAP4 gene showed viable homozygous knockout animals, but both males and females express reduced body size compared to wild-type mice.The males in specific however showed similar expression to the pet/pet rat with significantly smaller testes size as well as seminiferous tubule degeneration. Along with this there was also a loss of germ cells and some structural anomalies like cellular displacement into the lumen and microtubule disruption. Together these observations show that THAP4 is involved in maintenance of seminiferous tubules a swell as growth and tissue organization in mammals.

Additional studies in mice indicate that although some knockout animals survive into adulthood, they exhibit delayed developmental progression and significant differences in body size and morphology. In knockout males, testis development closely mirrors that of rat mutants like pet/pet, further supporting a conserved requirement for THAP4 in male reproductive development across rodents. Interestingly, unlike the rat mutants, knockout male mice displayed larger thymus size relative to the controls, (adult mice) suggesting a possible species specific difference in the role of THAP4 in immune tissue homeostasis.Despite the pronounced testicular defects, THAP4 knockout males remained fertile, though with significantly reduced seminiferous tubule diameter and ongoing germ cell loss. These results point toward a partial impairment of spermatogenesis rather than complete infertility. Together, rodent models consistently show that THAP4 plays a role in proper testis structure, somatic growth, and germ cell maintenance. The model organisms in this study reinforced the possible biological importance of THAP4.
