= MBD4 =

Protein-coding gene in the species Homo sapiens

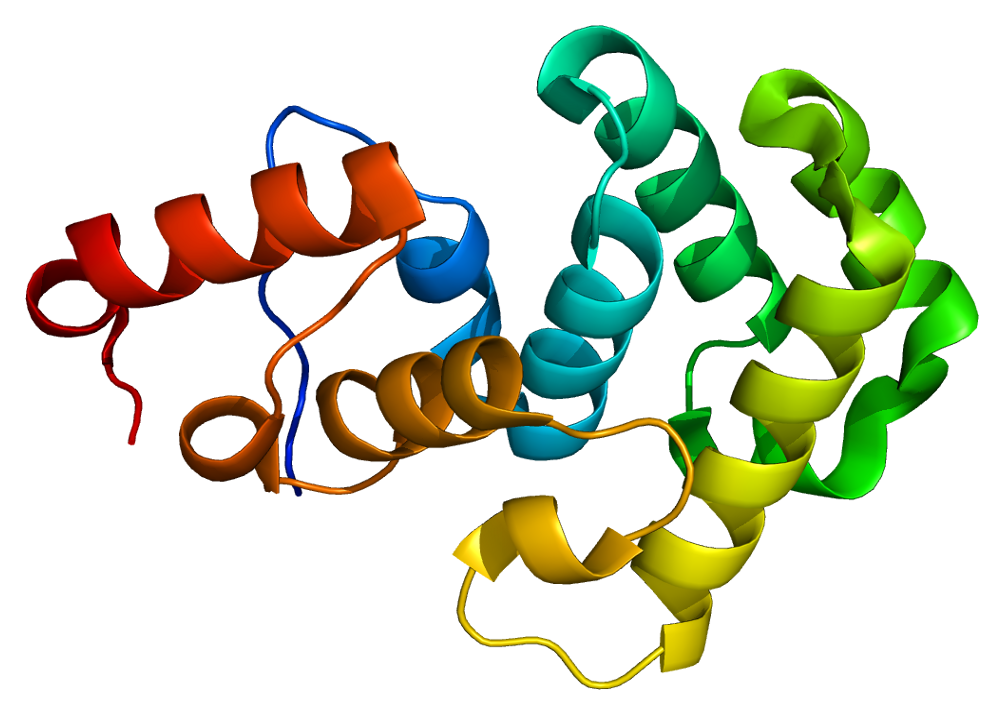

Identifiers
- Aliases: MBD4, MED1, methyl-CpG binding domain 4, DNA glycosylase
- External IDs: OMIM: 603574; MGI: 1333850; GeneCards: MBD4
Available structures
PDB	Ortholog search: PDBe RCSB
PDB	List of PDB id codes 2MOE, 3IHO, 4DK9, 4E9E, 4E9F, 4E9G, 4E9H, 4EA4, 4EA5, 4LG7, 4OFA, 4OFE, 4OFH, 5CHZ

Gene location (Human)
Chr.	Chromosome 3 (human)
Band	3q21.3	Start	129,430,947 bp
Band	3q21.3	End	129,440,179 bp

Gene location (Mouse)
Chr.	Chromosome 6 (mouse)
Band	6 E3|6 53.72 cM	Start	115,817,658 bp
Band	6 E3|6 53.72 cM	End	115,830,332 bp
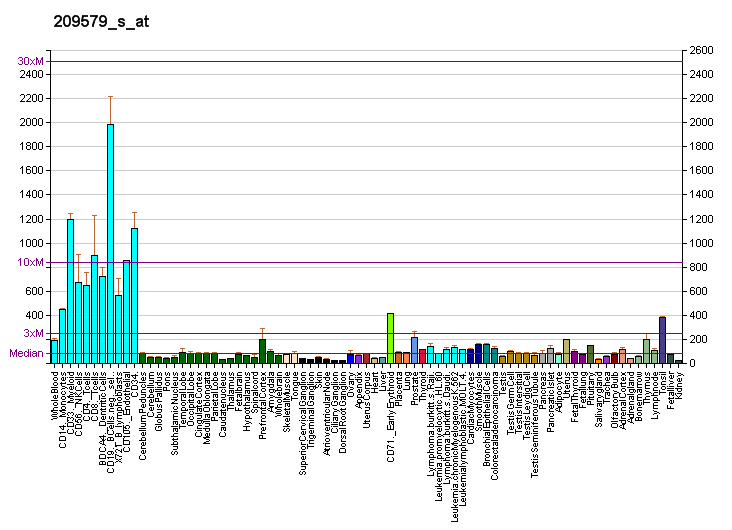

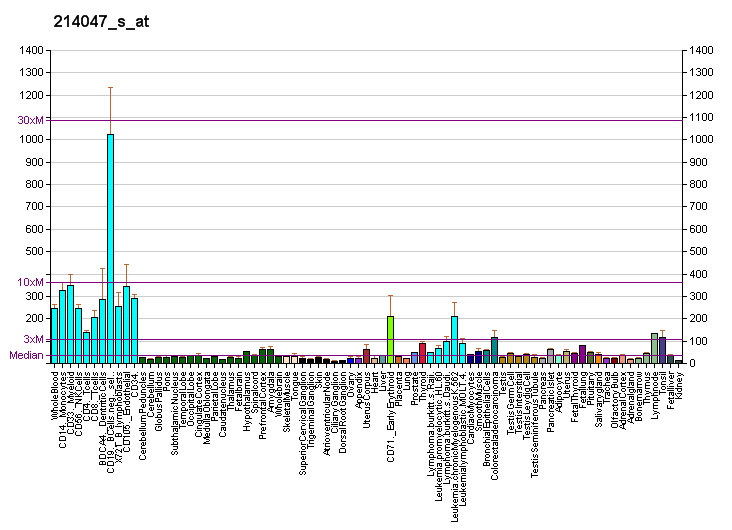

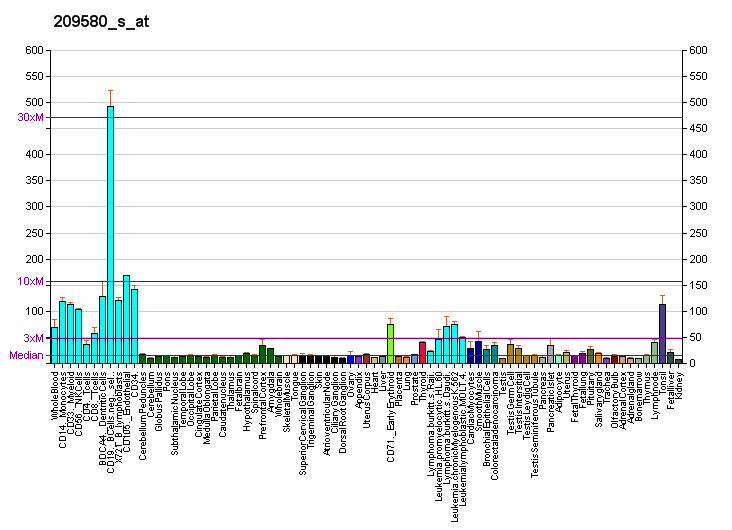
RNA expression pattern
Bgee	Human / Mouse (ortholog); Top expressed in: secondary oocyte; pylorus; visceral pleura; trabecular bone; caput epididymis; epithelium of nasopharynx; optic nerve; cardia; renal medulla; corpus epididymis / Top expressed in: lumbar spinal ganglion; epithelium of male urethra; genital tubercle; tail of embryo; vagina; Rostral migratory stream; ejaculatory duct; pelvic part of vagina; epiblast; embryo; More reference expression data
BioGPS	More reference expression data
Gene ontology
Molecular function	DNA binding; satellite DNA binding; endodeoxyribonuclease activity; protein binding; catalytic activity; hydrolase activity; pyrimidine-specific mismatch base pair DNA N-glycosylase activity; DNA N-glycosylase activity
Cellular component	chromatin; nucleus; nucleoplasm; nuclear speck
Biological process	response to estradiol; depyrimidination; DNA repair; cellular response to DNA damage stimulus; response to radiation
Sources:Amigo / QuickGO
Orthologs
Databases	NCBI: entry; OMA: entry
Species	Human	Mouse
Entrez	8930	17193
Ensembl	ENSG00000129071	ENSMUSG00000030322
UniProt	O95243	Q9Z2D7
RefSeq (mRNA)	NM_001276270; NM_001276271; NM_001276272; NM_001276273; NM_003925	NM_010774
RefSeq (protein)	NP_001263199; NP_001263200; NP_001263201; NP_001263202; NP_003916	NP_034904
Location (UCSC)	Chr 3: 129.43 – 129.44 Mb	Chr 6: 115.82 – 115.83 Mb
PubMed search
- Wikidata
View/Edit Human	View/Edit Mouse

Methyl-CpG-binding domain protein 4 is a protein that in humans is encoded by the MBD4 gene.

== Structure ==
Human MBD4 protein has 580 amino acids with a methyl-CpG-binding domain at amino acids 82–147 and a C-terminal DNA glycosylase domain at amino acids 426–580. These domains are separated by an intervening region that interacts with UHRF1, an E3 ubiquitin ligase, and USP7, a de-ubiquinating enzyme.

== Function ==
DNA methylation is the major modification of eukaryotic genomes and plays an essential role in mammalian development. Human proteins MECP2, MBD1, MBD2, MBD3, and MBD4 (this gene) comprise a family of nuclear proteins related by the presence in each of a methyl-CpG-binding domain (MBD). Each of these proteins, with the exception of MBD3, is capable of binding specifically to methylated DNA. MBD4 may function to mediate the biological consequences of the methylation signal. In addition, MBD4 has protein sequence similarity to bacterial DNA repair enzymes and thus may have some function in DNA repair. Further, MBD4 gene mutations are detected in tumors with primary microsatellite instability (MSI), a form of genomic instability associated with defective DNA mismatch repair, and MBD4 gene meets 4 of 5 criteria of a bona fide MIS target gene.

=== Deaminated bases as targets ===
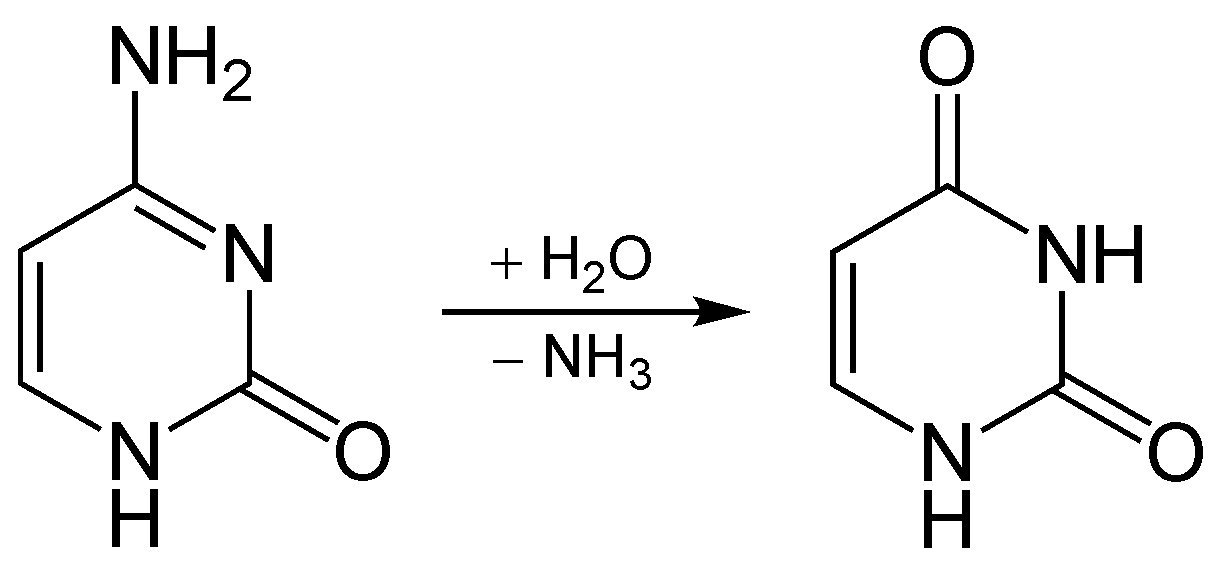

Bases in DNA decay spontaneously, and this decay includes hydrolytic deamination of purines and pyrimidines that contain an exocyclic amino group (see image). Hypoxanthine and xanthine are generated at a relatively slow rate by deamination of adenine and guanine, respectively. However, deamination of pyrimidines occurs at a 50-fold higher rate of approximately 200–300 events per cell per day, and is potentially highly mutagenic. Deamination of cytosine (C) to uracil (U) and 5-methylcytosine (5mC) to thymine (T) generates G:U and G:T mismatches, respectively. Upon DNA replication, these mismatches cause C to T transition mutations. Notably, for 5mC deamination, these mutations arise predominantly in the context of CpG sites. The deamination rate of 5mC is approximately three times that of C. MBD4 protein binds preferentially to fully methylated CpG sites and to their deamination derivatives G:U and G:T base pairs. MBD4, which is employed in an initial step of base excision repair, specifically catalyzes the removal of T and U paired with guanine (G) within CpG sites.

=== Mutational importance of targets ===
G:U and G:T mismatches, upon DNA replication, give rise to C to T transition mutations. The mismatched U or T is usually removed by MBD4 before replication, thus avoiding mutation. Alternatively, for G:T mismatches, the T may be removed by thymine-DNA glycosylase. Mutations in the MBD4 gene (especially expansions/deletions in the polyadenine regions of the MBD4 gene) increase the genomic instability phenotype of a subset of MMR-defective tumors in mice, specifically contributing to elevated G:C to A:T transitions.

About 1/3 of all intragenic single base pair mutations in human cancers occur in CpG dinucleotides and are the result of C to T or G to A transitions. These transitions comprise the most frequent mutations in human cancer. For example, nearly 50% of somatic mutations of the tumor suppressor gene p53 in colorectal cancer are G:C to A:T transitions within CpG sites.

== Clinical significance in cancer ==
=== Germline mutations of MBD4 ===
Mono- and biallelic germline mutations of MBD4 have been identified in acute myeloid leukemias, uveal melanomas, and glioblastomas. and monoallelic MBD4 germline mutations have been shown to predispose to uveal melanomas. These cases presented an inactivation of the second allele of MBD4 in tumor and were associated with a subsequent very high mutation burden at CpG dinucleotides. An MBD4 monoallelic deletion was found amon Israeli Christian Arabs. This heterozygous mutation increased somatic mutation rate in blood cells among carriers.

=== Somatic mutations of MBD4 ===
Mutation of MBD4 occurs in about 4% of colorectal cancers. MBD4 mutations also occur in tumor samples of melanoma, ovarian, lung, esophageal and prostate cancers at frequencies between 0.5% and 8%.

MBD4 has a special relationship with DNA mismatch repair (MMR). MBD4 protein binds strongly to the MMR protein MLH1. A mutational deficiency in MBD4 causes down-regulation, at the protein level, of MMR proteins Mlh1, Msh2, Pms2, and Msh6 by 5.8-, 5.6-, 2.6-, and 2.7-fold, respectively. In colorectal cancers with mutations in MMR genes, co-occurrence of MBD4 mutations were found in 27% of cancers.

=== Epigenetic silencing ===
MBD4 mRNA expression is reduced in colorectal neoplasms due to methylation of the promoter region of MBD4. A majority of histologically normal fields surrounding the neoplastic growths also show reduced MBD4 mRNA expression (a field defect) compared to histologically normal tissue from individuals who never had a colonic neoplasm. This indicates that an epigenetic deficiency in MBD4 expression is a frequent early event in colorectal tumorigenesis.

While other DNA repair genes, such as MGMT and MLH1, are often evaluated for epigenetic repression in many types of cancer, epigenetic deficiency of MBD4 is usually not evaluated, but might be of importance in such cancers as well.

=== Response to checkpoint inhibitors ===
MBD4-associated hypermutated profile was shown to be associated with a tumor regression when a uveal melanoma patient was treated with a checkpoint inhibitor making these mutations potential biomarkers to treat cancers.

== Interactions ==
MBD4 has been shown to interact with MLH1 and FADD.
