= QRICH1 =

Protein found in humans

Identifiers
- Aliases: QRICH1, glutamine rich 1, VERBRAS, AB-DIP
- External IDs: OMIM: 617387; MGI: 1916482; GeneCards: QRICH1

Gene location (Human)
Chr.	Chromosome 3 (human)
Band	3p21.31	Start	49,029,707 bp
Band	3p21.31	End	49,094,363 bp

Gene location (Mouse)
Chr.	Chromosome 9 (mouse)
Band	9|9 F2	Start	108,394,005 bp
Band	9|9 F2	End	108,437,362 bp
RNA expression pattern
Bgee	Human / Mouse (ortholog); Top expressed in: granulocyte; skin of leg; skin of abdomen; right testis; left testis; right lung; right hemisphere of cerebellum; ganglionic eminence; ventricular zone; spleen / Top expressed in: spermatocyte; spermatid; tail of embryo; genital tubercle; seminiferous tubule; mandibular prominence; maxillary prominence; epiblast; molar; endocardial cushion; More reference expression data
BioGPS	n/a
Gene ontology
Molecular function	protein binding; DNA-binding transcription factor activity, RNA polymerase II-specific; DNA binding; molecular function
Cellular component	cytoplasm; nucleoplasm; cellular component; nucleus
Biological process	cytoskeleton organization; regulation of cell morphogenesis; regulation of transcription by RNA polymerase II; multicellular organism development; biological process
Sources:Amigo / QuickGO
Orthologs
Databases	NCBI: entry; OMA: entry
Species	Human	Mouse
Entrez	54870	69232
Ensembl	ENSG00000198218	ENSMUSG00000006673
UniProt	Q2TAL8	Q3UA37
RefSeq (mRNA)	NM_017730; NM_198880; NM_001320580; NM_001320581; NM_001320582 NM_001320583; NM_001320584; NM_001320585	NM_001114119; NM_175143
RefSeq (protein)	NP_001307509; NP_001307510; NP_001307511; NP_001307512; NP_001307513 NP_001307514; NP_060200; NP_942581; NP_060200.2; NP_942581.1; NP_001307509.1; NP_001307510.1; NP_001307511.1; NP_001307512.1; NP_001307513.1; NP_001307514.1	NP_001107591; NP_780352
Location (UCSC)	Chr 3: 49.03 – 49.09 Mb	Chr 9: 108.39 – 108.44 Mb
PubMed search
- Wikidata
View/Edit Human	View/Edit Mouse

QRICH1, also known as Glutamine-rich protein 1, is a protein that in humans is encoded by the QRICH1 gene. One notable feature of this protein is that it contains a caspase activation recruitment domain (CARD domain). As a result of having this domain, QRICH1 is believed to be involved in apoptotic, inflammatory, and host-immune response pathways.

== Gene ==
The QRICH1 gene is 64,363 base pairs long, encoding an mRNA transcript that is 3331 bp in length. QRICH1 is located on chromosome 3p21.31 and contains 11 exons. The genomic sequence begins at base pair 49,057,531 and ends at base pair 49,141,201.

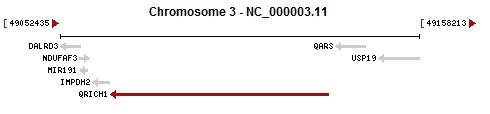
The gene neighborhood of QRICH1 constructed by NCBI Gene

== Function ==
The exact function of QRICH1 is not well understood. It is, however, thought to be involved in processes such as inflammation and apoptosis due to the presence of a CARD domain near the beginning of the protein sequence. This protein is predicted to localize to the nucleus and is known to interact with the ATXN1 and ATF7IP proteins.

== Protein ==
The glutamine-rich protein 1 is 776 amino acids in length. Glutamine residues are abundant, comprising 109 of the amino acids or 14% of the protein. The protein contains three distinct domains. The first, a CARD domain, is a member of the death fold superfamily and is involved in apoptosis signaling pathways, immune signaling, inflammation, and host-defense mechanisms. The second domain is a glutamine-rich domain which comprises a majority of the protein and is highly conserved among orthologs. The final domain is a Domain of unknown function (DUF3504) found near the end of the protein sequence. All three of these domains are well conserved throughout strict orthologs.

=== Predicted features ===
Properties of QRICH1 that were predicted using Bioinformatics tools:

- Molecular weight: 86.5 KDa
- Isoelectric point: 5.59
- Post-translational modification: multiple phosphorylation sites are reported or predicted. PhosphoSitePlus contains three annotated phosphorylated serines at residues 343, 345, and 659. The NetPhos program on ExPASy predicted 45 phosphorylation sites on multiple serine, threonine, and tyrosine residues. There is one predicted sulfinated tyrosine at amino acid 725.
- No predicted signal peptide or signal peptide cleavage.
- Interacting proteins: ATXN1, Spinocerebellar ataxia type 1 protein, and ATF7IP, activating transcription factor 7-interacting protein 1. ATXN1 is involved in binding RNA in vitro and may be involved in RNA metabolism. ATF7IP is a recruiter protein that couples transcriptional factors to the general transcription apparatus, thereby modulating transcription regulation and chromatin formation.

== Expression ==
QRICH1 is expressed at a high level, 3.3 times the average gene. It is expressed ubiquitously throughout the human body, although EST Profile data reveal that QRICH1 is expressed particularly high in tissues such as the thymus, testis, cerebellar cortex and other areas of the brain, trachea, and in embryonic tissue. Health states such as germ cell tumors, leukemia, lymphoma, and chondrosarcoma have also reported high QRICH1 expression.

== Homology ==
=== Orthologs ===
QRICH1 is highly conserved among mammalian orthologs, along with other chordates such as fish, birds, and amphibians. The gene has some conservation among insects, but there were no orthologs found in plants, fungi, or yeast.

Genus/species	Organism common name	Accession number	Sequence identity	Sequence similarity	Length (AAs)
Pan troglodytes	Chimpanzee	XP_001161499.1	99%	99%	766
Macaca mulatta	Rhesus macaque	XP_001110386.2	99%	99%	659
Pongo abelii	Orangutan	XP_002813809.1	99%	99%	777
Mus musculus	House mouse	NP_780352.2	99%	99%	777
Rattus norvegicus	Norway rat	NP_001128004.1	99%	99%	687
Canis familiaris	Dog	XP_850904.1	99%	99%	780
Bos taurus	Cow	NP_001091484.1	99%	99%	779
Sus scrofa	Wild boar	XP_003132250.1	99%	99%	781
Oryctolagus cuniculus	European rabbit	XP_002713458.1	99%	99%	777
Ailuropoda melanoleuca	Giant panda	XP_002920598.1	99%	99%	780
Callithrix jacchus	Marmoset	XP_002758378.1	99%	99%	777
Equus caballus	Horse	XP_001498380.2	98%	98%	780
Monodelphis domestica	Opossum	XP_001367745.1	95%	97%	776
Gallus gallus	Chicken	XP_001233527.1	94%	96%	773
Ornithorhynchus anatinus	Platypus	XP_001505372.1	94%	95%	741
Taeniopygia guttata	Zebra finch	XP_002187824.1	93%	97%	772
Xenopus laevis	African clawed frog	NP_001083416.1	79%	85%	755
Tetraodon nigroviridis	Pufferfish	CAG11318.1	71%	80%	729
Danio rerio	Zebra fish	NP_001020633.1	63%	73%	717
Apis mellifera	Bee	XP_624959.2	47%	64%	1356
Camponotus floridanus	Carpenter ant	EFN71787.1	45%	63%	1724

=== Paralogs ===
QRICH1 has five paralogs all of which encode a zinc finger protein.

== Role in human disease ==
Ververi-Brady syndrome is caused by mutations in the gene encoding QRICH1.
