= CHAF1A =

Protein-coding gene in humans

Available structures
PDB	Ortholog search: PDBe RCSB
PDB	List of PDB id codes 1S4Z

Identifiers
- Aliases: CHAF1A, CAF-1, CAF1, CAF1B, CAF1P150, P150, chromatin assembly factor 1 subunit A
- External IDs: OMIM: 601246; MGI: 1351331; HomoloGene: 4003; GeneCards: CHAF1A; OMA:CHAF1A - orthologs

Gene location (Human)
Chr.	Chromosome 19 (human)
Band	19p13.3	Start	4,402,640 bp
Band	19p13.3	End	4,445,018 bp

Gene location (Mouse)
Chr.	Chromosome 17 (mouse)
Band	17|17 D	Start	56,347,439 bp
Band	17|17 D	End	56,379,289 bp
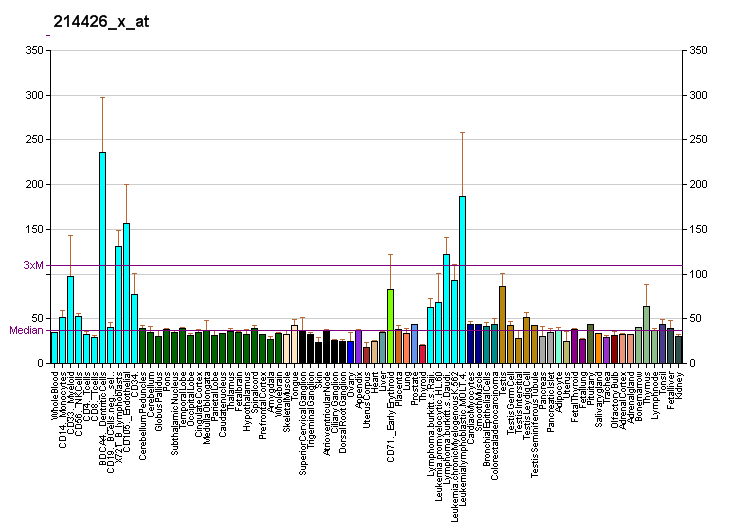

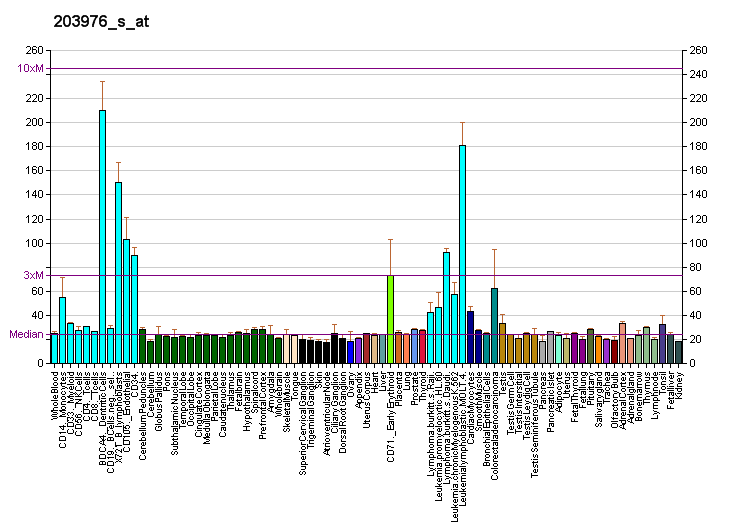

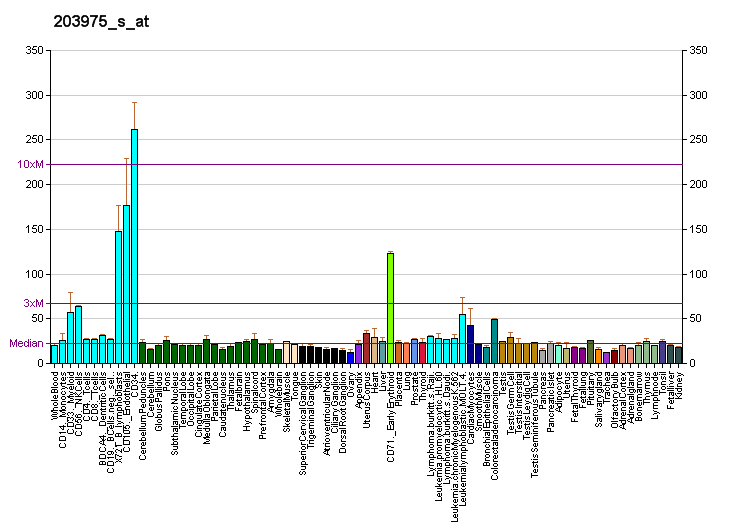
RNA expression pattern
Bgee	Human / Mouse (ortholog); Top expressed in: secondary oocyte; sural nerve; ventricular zone; nipple; embryo; ganglionic eminence; gingival epithelium; pylorus; amniotic fluid; Skeletal muscle tissue of rectus abdominis / Top expressed in: primary oocyte; secondary oocyte; embryonic cell; zygote; bone marrow; yolk sac; epiblast; tail of embryo; otic vesicle; testicle; More reference expression data
BioGPS	More reference expression data
Gene ontology
Molecular function	unfolded protein binding; chromatin binding; protein binding; chromo shadow domain binding; identical protein binding
Cellular component	CAF-1 complex; nucleus; protein-containing complex
Biological process	DNA replication; cell cycle; DNA repair; cellular response to DNA damage stimulus; DNA replication-dependent chromatin assembly; nucleosome assembly
Sources:Amigo / QuickGO
Orthologs
Species	Human	Mouse
Entrez	10036	27221
Ensembl	ENSG00000167670	ENSMUSG00000002835
UniProt	Q13111	Q9QWF0
RefSeq (mRNA)	NM_005483	NM_013733
RefSeq (protein)	NP_005474	NP_038761
Location (UCSC)	Chr 19: 4.4 – 4.45 Mb	Chr 17: 56.35 – 56.38 Mb
PubMed search
- Wikidata
View/Edit Human	View/Edit Mouse

Chromatin assembly factor 1 subunit A is a protein that in humans is encoded by the CHAF1A gene.

== Function ==
Chromatin assembly factor I (CAF-1) is a nuclear complex consisting of p50, p60 (CHAF1B; MIM 601245), and p150 (CHAF1A) subunits that assembles histone tetramers onto replicating DNA in vitro (Kaufman et al., 1995).[supplied by OMIM]

== Interactions ==
CHAF1A has been shown to interact with:

- ASF1A,
- ASF1B,
- BLM,
- CBX5, and
- MBD1.
