= MBD3 =

Protein-coding gene in the species Homo sapiens

Identifiers
- Aliases: MBD3, methyl-CpG binding domain protein 3
- External IDs: OMIM: 603573; MGI: 1333812; GeneCards: MBD3
Available structures
PDB	Ortholog search: PDBe RCSB
PDB	List of PDB id codes 2MB7

Gene location (Human)
Chr.	Chromosome 19 (human)
Band	19p13.3	Start	1,573,596 bp
Band	19p13.3	End	1,592,865 bp

Gene location (Mouse)
Chr.	Chromosome 10 (mouse)
Band	10 C1|10 39.72 cM	Start	80,228,373 bp
Band	10 C1|10 39.72 cM	End	80,235,384 bp
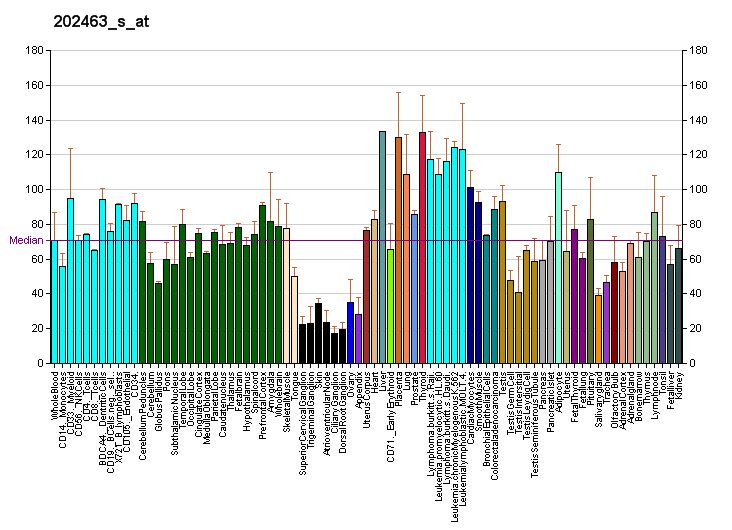

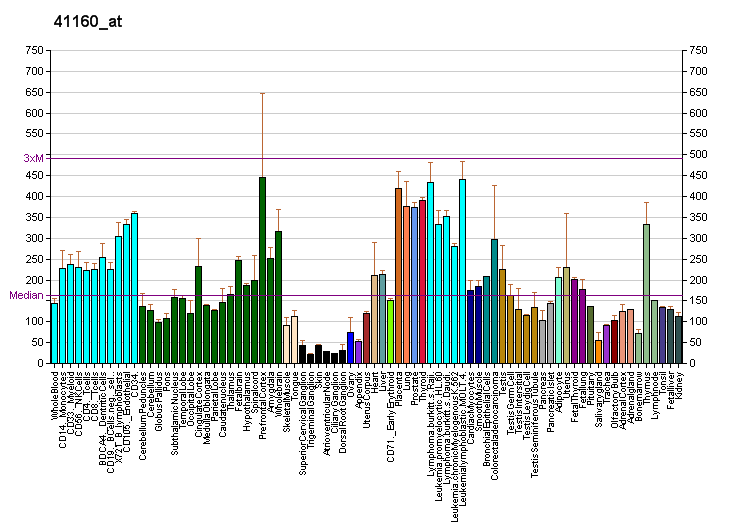
RNA expression pattern
Bgee	Human / Mouse (ortholog); Top expressed in: apex of heart; right frontal lobe; cingulate gyrus; anterior cingulate cortex; amygdala; mucosa of transverse colon; anterior pituitary; left uterine tube; right hemisphere of cerebellum; Brodmann area 10 / Top expressed in: ventricular zone; dentate gyrus of hippocampal formation granule cell; lip; yolk sac; muscle of thigh; superior frontal gyrus; choroid plexus of fourth ventricle; right kidney; epiblast; primary visual cortex; More reference expression data
BioGPS	More reference expression data
Gene ontology
Molecular function	methyl-CpG binding; DNA binding; nucleosomal DNA binding; RNA polymerase II cis-regulatory region sequence-specific DNA binding; protein binding; chromatin binding; histone deacetylase activity
Cellular component	nucleus; nucleoplasm; heterochromatin; chromosome; NuRD complex; cytoplasm; chromatin; protein-containing complex
Biological process	response to estradiol; tissue development; embryonic organ development; regulation of DNA methylation; in utero embryonic development; response to organic cyclic compound; regulation of transcription, DNA-templated; development of the heart; DNA methylation-dependent heterochromatin assembly; histone acetylation; negative regulation of transcription by RNA polymerase II; ageing; brain development; response to nutrient levels; transcription, DNA-templated; regulation of signal transduction by p53 class mediator; histone deacetylation
Sources:Amigo / QuickGO
Orthologs
Databases	NCBI: entry; OMA: entry
Species	Human	Mouse
Entrez	53615	17192
Ensembl	ENSG00000071655	ENSMUSG00000035478
UniProt	O95983	Q9Z2D8
RefSeq (mRNA)	NM_003926; NM_001281453; NM_001281454	NM_013595; NM_001306143
RefSeq (protein)	NP_001268382; NP_001268383	NP_001293072; NP_038623
Location (UCSC)	Chr 19: 1.57 – 1.59 Mb	Chr 10: 80.23 – 80.24 Mb
PubMed search
- Wikidata
View/Edit Human	View/Edit Mouse

Methyl-CpG-binding domain protein 3 is a protein that in humans is encoded by the MBD3 gene.

== Function ==
DNA methylation is the major modification of eukaryotic genomes and plays an essential role in mammalian development. Human proteins MECP2, MBD1, MBD2, MBD3, and MBD4 comprise a family of nuclear proteins related by the presence in each of a methyl-CpG binding domain (MBD). However, unlike the other family members, MBD3 is not capable of binding to methylated DNA but instead binds to hydroxymethylated DNA. The predicted MBD3 protein shares 71% and 94% identity with MBD2 (isoform 1) and mouse Mbd3. MBD3 is a subunit of the NuRD, a multisubunit complex containing nucleosome remodeling and histone deacetylase activities. MBD3 mediates the association of metastasis-associated protein 2 (MTA2) with the core histone deacetylase complex.

MBD3 also contains the coiled‐coil domain common to all three MBD3 isoforms.

== Interactions ==
MBD3 has been shown to interact with:

- AURKA,
- GATAD2B,
- HDAC1,
- MTA2, and
- MBD2.
