= GATAD2B =

Protein-coding gene in humans

Identifiers
- Aliases: GATAD2B, MRD18, P66beta, p68, GATA zinc finger domain containing 2B, GANDS
- External IDs: OMIM: 614998; MGI: 2443225; GeneCards: GATAD2B

Gene location (Human)
Chr.	Chromosome 1 (human)
Band	1q21.3	Start	153,789,030 bp
Band	1q21.3	End	153,923,360 bp

Gene location (Mouse)
Chr.	Chromosome 3 (mouse)
Band	3|3 F1	Start	90,200,485 bp
Band	3|3 F1	End	90,270,714 bp
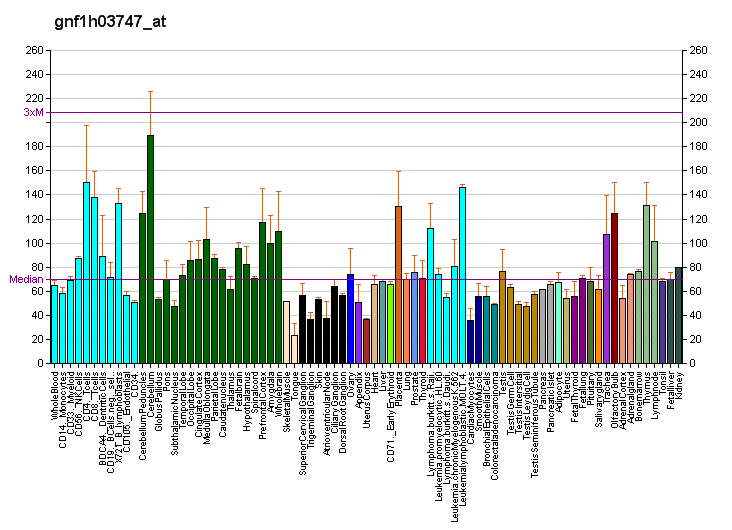
RNA expression pattern
Bgee	Human / Mouse (ortholog); Top expressed in: epithelium of colon; corpus callosum; bone marrow cell; skeletal muscle tissue; blood; tonsil; ganglionic eminence; sural nerve; ventricular zone; cerebellum / Top expressed in: secondary oocyte; zygote; ascending aorta; aortic valve; Rostral migratory stream; primary oocyte; supraoptic nucleus; genital tubercle; tail of embryo; cumulus cell; More reference expression data
BioGPS	More reference expression data
Gene ontology
Molecular function	DNA-binding transcription factor activity; RNA polymerase II cis-regulatory region sequence-specific DNA binding; nucleosomal DNA binding; sequence-specific DNA binding; zinc ion binding; protein binding; metal ion binding; DNA-binding transcription factor activity, RNA polymerase II-specific
Cellular component	nuclear speck; nucleus; nucleoplasm; NuRD complex; protein-containing complex
Biological process	regulation of transcription, DNA-templated; transcription, DNA-templated; negative regulation of transcription by RNA polymerase II
Sources:Amigo / QuickGO
Orthologs
Databases	NCBI: entry; OMA: entry
Species	Human	Mouse
Entrez	57459	229542
Ensembl	ENSG00000143614; ENSG00000261992	ENSMUSG00000042390
UniProt	Q8WXI9	Q8VHR5
RefSeq (mRNA)	NM_020699	NM_139304; NM_001379655; NM_001379656; NM_001379657
RefSeq (protein)	NP_065750	NP_647465; NP_001366584; NP_001366585; NP_001366586
Location (UCSC)	Chr 1: 153.79 – 153.92 Mb	Chr 3: 90.2 – 90.27 Mb
PubMed search
- Wikidata
View/Edit Human	View/Edit Mouse

Transcriptional repressor p66-beta is a protein that in humans is encoded by the GATAD2B gene.

== Interactions ==
GATAD2B has been shown to interact with Methyl-CpG-binding domain protein 2, MBD3, RBBP7 and RBBP4.
