= Histone H4 transcription factor =

Protein-coding gene in the species Homo sapiens

HINFP

Identifiers
- Aliases: HINFP, HiNF-P, MIZF, ZNF743, histone H4 transcription factor
- External IDs: OMIM: 607099; MGI: 2429620; GeneCards: HINFP

Gene location (Mouse)
Chr.	Chromosome 9 (mouse)
Band	9|9 A5.2	Start	44,203,737 bp
Band	9|9 A5.2	End	44,216,968 bp
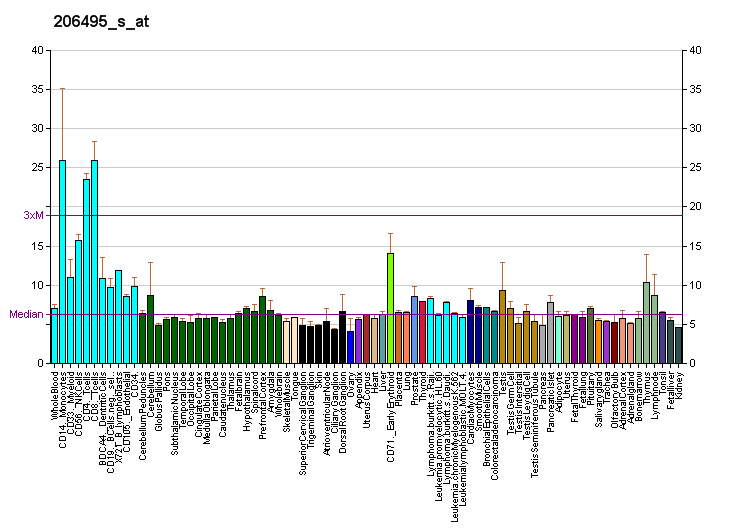
RNA expression pattern
Bgee	Human / Mouse (ortholog); n/a / Top expressed in: neural layer of retina; ascending aorta; aortic valve; granulocyte; Rostral migratory stream; spermatocyte; yolk sac; ventricular zone; tail of embryo; zygote
BioGPS	More reference expression data
Gene ontology
Molecular function	DNA binding; transcription coactivator activity; histone binding; metal ion binding; protein binding; nucleic acid binding; enzyme binding; RNA polymerase II cis-regulatory region sequence-specific DNA binding; DNA-binding transcription repressor activity, RNA polymerase II-specific; chromatin binding; DNA-binding transcription factor activity; DNA-binding transcription factor activity, RNA polymerase II-specific
Cellular component	Cajal body; nucleoplasm; nucleolus; nucleus
Biological process	regulation of transcription, DNA-templated; establishment of protein localization; DNA damage checkpoint signaling; regulation of transcription involved in G1/S transition of mitotic cell cycle; negative regulation of gene expression; transcription, DNA-templated; regulation of gene expression; myoblast differentiation; negative regulation of transcription, DNA-templated; DNA repair; negative regulation of transcription by RNA polymerase II; in utero embryonic development; positive regulation of gene expression; positive regulation of transcription, DNA-templated; G1/S transition of mitotic cell cycle
Sources:Amigo / QuickGO
Orthologs
Databases	NCBI: entry; OMA: entry
Species	Human	Mouse
Entrez	25988	102423
Ensembl	ENSG00000172273	ENSMUSG00000032119
UniProt	Q9BQA5	Q8K1K9
RefSeq (mRNA)	NM_001243259; NM_015517; NM_198971	NM_172162
RefSeq (protein)	NP_001230188; NP_056332; NP_945322; NP_001338886; NP_001338887 NP_001338888; NP_001338889; NP_001338890; NP_001338891; NP_001338892; NP_001338893; NP_001338894; NP_001338895; NP_001338898; NP_001338900; NP_001338901; NP_001338903	NP_751894; NP_001391993; NP_001391994; NP_001391995
Location (UCSC)	n/a	Chr 9: 44.2 – 44.22 Mb
PubMed search
- Wikidata
View/Edit Human	View/Edit Mouse

Histone H4 transcription factor (or HiNF-P) is a protein that in humans is encoded by the HINFP gene (previously MIZF). HiNF-P/HINFP stand for "histone nuclear factor P".

== Function ==
HiNF-P is a protein that binds to a highly conserved DNA motif found in most histone H4 genes. HiNF-P activates H4 gene expression through interactions with the CDK2 substrate NPAT which is localized in Histone Locus Bodies. HiNF-P was independently described as a protein called "MBD2 interacting zinc finger protein" (MIZF). MIZF was reported to interact with methyl-CpG-binding protein-2 (MBD2; MIM 603547), a component of the MeCP1 histone deacetylase (HDAC) complex. MIZF is thought to play a role in DNA methylation and transcription repression.[supplied by OMIM]

== Interactions ==
One key partner protein of HiNF-P is NPAT, a CDK2 substrate that localizes to Histone Locus Bodies. HiNF-P has been reported to interact with Methyl-CpG-binding domain protein 2 and DHX9.
