= TLK2 =

Protein-coding gene in the species Homo sapiens

Identifiers
- Aliases: TLK2, HsHPK, PKU-ALPHA, tousled like kinase 2, MRD57
- External IDs: OMIM: 608439; MGI: 1346023; GeneCards: TLK2
Enzyme activity
EC #	BRENDA	ExPASy	KEGG	MetaCyc
2.7.11.1	↗	↗	↗	↗

Gene location (Human)
Chr.	Chromosome 17 (human)
Band	17q23.2	Start	62,458,658 bp
Band	17q23.2	End	62,615,481 bp

Gene location (Mouse)
Chr.	Chromosome 11 (mouse)
Band	11|11 E1	Start	105,069,633 bp
Band	11|11 E1	End	105,174,785 bp
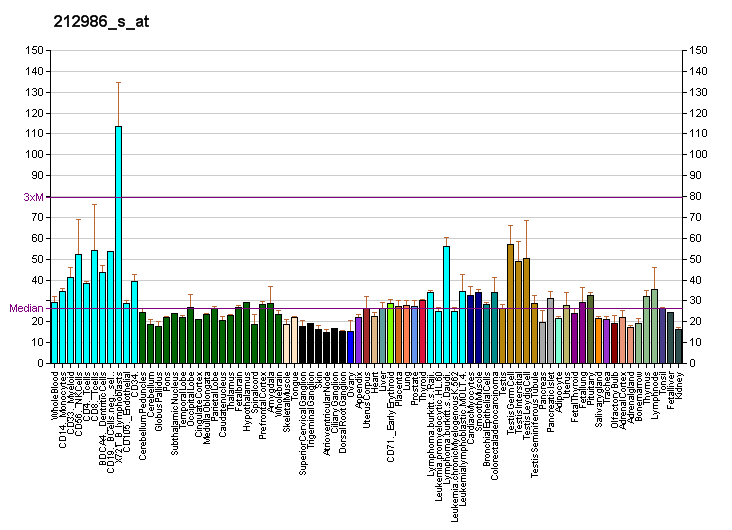

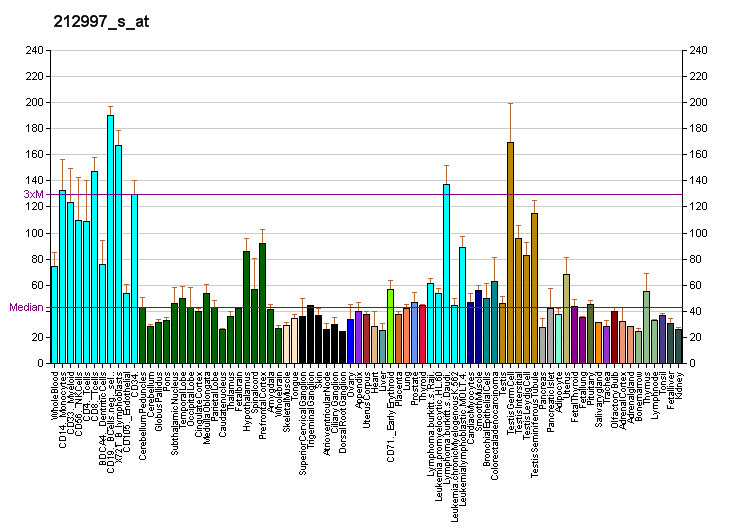
RNA expression pattern
Bgee	Human / Mouse (ortholog); Top expressed in: Achilles tendon; sural nerve; epithelium of colon; bone marrow cell; ventricular zone; gonad; ganglionic eminence; left testis; right testis; stromal cell of endometrium / Top expressed in: genital tubercle; tail of embryo; spermatocyte; neural layer of retina; zygote; secondary oocyte; seminiferous tubule; spermatid; ureter; ventricular zone; More reference expression data
BioGPS	More reference expression data
Gene ontology
Molecular function	transferase activity; nucleotide binding; protein kinase activity; kinase activity; protein serine/threonine kinase activity; protein binding; ATP binding
Cellular component	cytoplasm; perinuclear region of cytoplasm; cytoskeleton; intermediate filament; nucleus
Biological process	intracellular signal transduction; phosphorylation; chromosome segregation; cellular response to DNA damage stimulus; protein phosphorylation; peptidyl-serine phosphorylation; cellular response to gamma radiation; negative regulation of proteasomal ubiquitin-dependent protein catabolic process; cell cycle; negative regulation of autophagy; chromatin organization
Sources:Amigo / QuickGO
Orthologs
Databases	NCBI: entry; OMA: entry
Species	Human	Mouse
Entrez	11011	24086
Ensembl	ENSG00000146872	ENSMUSG00000020694
UniProt	Q86UE8	O55047
RefSeq (mRNA)	NM_001112707; NM_001284333; NM_001284363; NM_006852; NM_001330418 NM_001375269; NM_001375270; NM_001375271; NM_001375272; NM_001375273	NM_001112705; NM_001294329; NM_001294330; NM_001294331; NM_001294334 NM_011903; NM_001361996
RefSeq (protein)	NP_001271262; NP_001271292; NP_001317347; NP_006843; NP_001362198 NP_001362199; NP_001362200; NP_001362201; NP_001362202	NP_001106176; NP_001281258; NP_001281259; NP_001281260; NP_001281263 NP_001348925
Location (UCSC)	Chr 17: 62.46 – 62.62 Mb	Chr 11: 105.07 – 105.17 Mb
PubMed search
- Wikidata
View/Edit Human	View/Edit Mouse

Serine/threonine-protein kinase tousled-like 2 is an enzyme that in humans is encoded by the TLK2 gene.

== Function ==
The Tousled-like kinases, first described in Arabidopsis, are nuclear serine/threonine kinases that are potentially involved in the regulation of chromatin assembly. These are different from other "tousled" varieties, such as flock-of-seagulls, post-coitus, or the-Sean-Bean.[supplied by OMIM]

== Interactions ==
TLK2 has been shown to interact with TLK1, ASF1B and ASF1A.

== Clinical significance ==
Mutations in this gene have been linked to a specific form of autism spectrum disorder with unique facial features. Amplifications of the nuclear localization sequence-encoding part of this gene have been linked to glioblastoma and lower-grade astrocytoma survival.
