= Methyl-CpG-binding domain protein 2 =

Protein-coding gene in the species Homo sapiens

MBD2

Identifiers
- Aliases: MBD2, DMTase, NY-CO-41, methyl-CpG binding domain protein 2
- External IDs: OMIM: 603547; MGI: 1333813; GeneCards: MBD2
Available structures
PDB	Ortholog search: PDBe RCSB
PDB	List of PDB id codes 2L2L

Gene location (Human)
Chr.	Chromosome 18 (human)
Band	18q21.2	Start	54,151,606 bp
Band	18q21.2	End	54,224,669 bp

Gene location (Mouse)
Chr.	Chromosome 18 (mouse)
Band	18 E2|18 44.54 cM	Start	70,701,260 bp
Band	18 E2|18 44.54 cM	End	70,759,202 bp
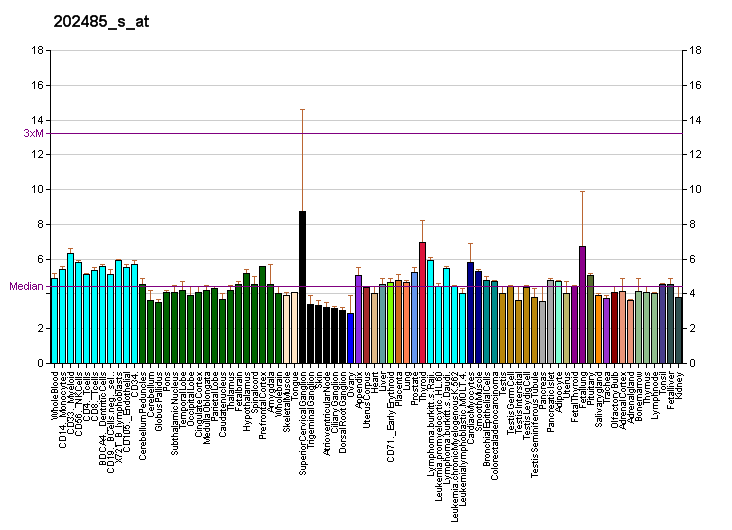

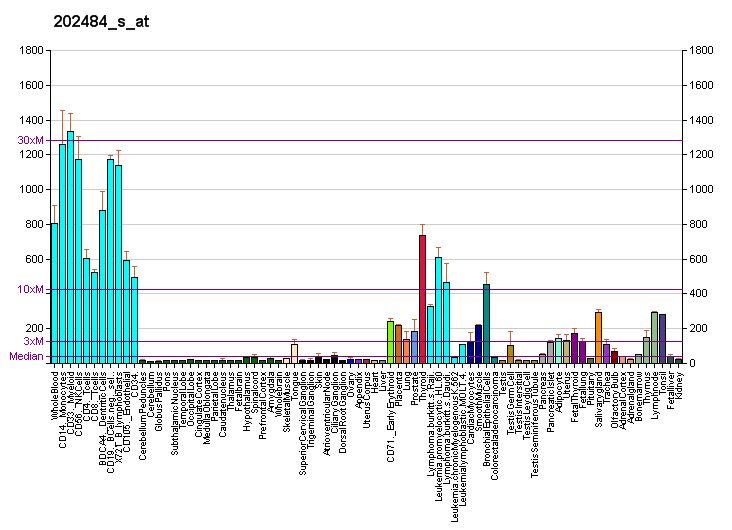
RNA expression pattern
Bgee	Human / Mouse (ortholog); Top expressed in: gingival epithelium; tonsil; epithelium of colon; oral cavity; bone marrow cell; parotid gland; white blood cell; sural nerve; mucosa of esophagus; monocyte / Top expressed in: epithelium of urethra; granulocyte; Paneth cell; epithelium of male urethra; epithelium of female urethra; hair follicle; aortic valve; ascending aorta; lip; submandibular gland; More reference expression data
BioGPS	More reference expression data
Gene ontology
Molecular function	RNA polymerase II cis-regulatory region sequence-specific DNA binding; DNA binding; protein domain specific binding; methyl-CpG binding; C2H2 zinc finger domain binding; chromatin binding; protein binding; siRNA binding; nucleosomal DNA binding; satellite DNA binding; mRNA binding
Cellular component	cytoplasm; histone deacetylase complex; heterochromatin; chromatin; nucleus; nucleoplasm; cytosol; protein-containing complex
Biological process	regulation of transcription, DNA-templated; negative regulation of transcription by RNA polymerase II; transcription, DNA-templated; positive regulation of Wnt signaling pathway; regulation of cell population proliferation; maternal behavior; negative regulation of transcription, DNA-templated; ageing; response to mechanical stimulus; response to estradiol; cellular response to organic cyclic compound; response to nutrient levels; response to organic cyclic compound; positive regulation of chromatin binding; development of the heart; embryonic organ development; rDNA heterochromatin assembly; regulation of DNA methylation; DNA methylation-dependent heterochromatin assembly
Sources:Amigo / QuickGO
Orthologs
Databases	NCBI: entry; OMA: entry
Species	Human	Mouse
Entrez	8932	17191
Ensembl	ENSG00000134046	ENSMUSG00000024513
UniProt	Q9UBB5	Q9Z2E1
RefSeq (mRNA)	NM_015832; NM_003927	NM_010773; NM_001311071
RefSeq (protein)	NP_003918; NP_056647; NP_056647.1	NP_001298000; NP_034903
Location (UCSC)	Chr 18: 54.15 – 54.22 Mb	Chr 18: 70.7 – 70.76 Mb
PubMed search
- Wikidata
View/Edit Human	View/Edit Mouse

Methyl-CpG-binding domain protein 2 is a protein that in humans is encoded by the MBD2 gene.

== Function ==
DNA methylation is the major modification of eukaryotic genomes and plays an essential role in mammalian development. Human proteins MECP2, MBD1, MBD2, MBD3, and MBD4 comprise a family of nuclear proteins related by the presence in each of a methyl-CpG-binding domain (MBD). Each of these proteins, with the exception of MBD3, is capable of binding specifically to methylated DNA. MECP2, MBD1, and MBD2 can also repress transcription from methylated gene promoters. The protein encoded by these genes may function as a mediator of the biological consequences of the methylation signal. It is also reported that MBD2 and MBD3 recruit the NuRD complex to regions of DNA depending on their selective binding of methylated CpG sites. Therefore, MBD2/NuRD and MBD3/NuRD define two distinct protein complexes with different biochemical and functional properties.

== Interactions ==
Methyl-CpG-binding domain protein 2 has been shown to interact with:

- GATAD2B,
- HDAC1,
- Histone deacetylase 2,
- MBD3
- HINFP (or MIZF), and
- SIN3A.
