= ASF1A =

Protein-coding gene in the species Homo sapiens

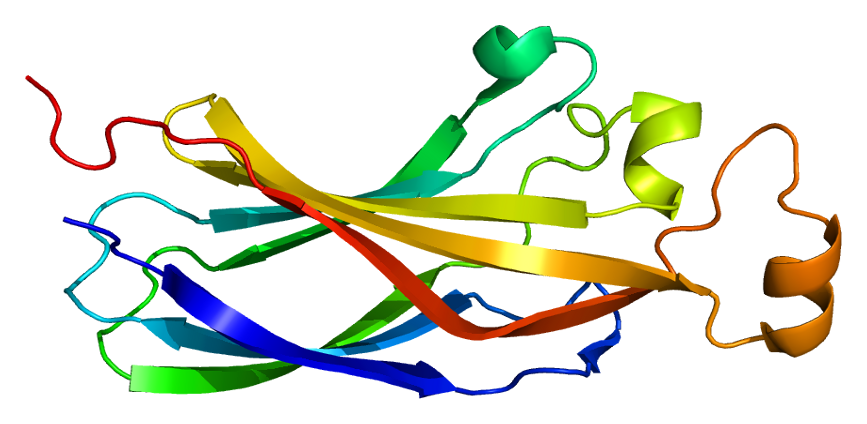
Available structures
PDB	Ortholog search: PDBe RCSB
PDB	List of PDB id codes 1TEY, 2I32, 2IIJ, 2IO5, 3AAD, 5C3I

Identifiers
- Aliases: ASF1A, CGI-98, CIA, HSPC146, anti-silencing function 1A histone chaperone
- External IDs: OMIM: 609189; MGI: 1913653; HomoloGene: 8528; GeneCards: ASF1A; OMA:ASF1A - orthologs

Gene location (Human)
Chr.	Chromosome 6 (human)
Band	6q22.31	Start	118,894,152 bp
Band	6q22.31	End	118,909,171 bp

Gene location (Mouse)
Chr.	Chromosome 10 (mouse)
Band	10|10 B3	Start	53,472,853 bp
Band	10|10 B3	End	53,485,321 bp
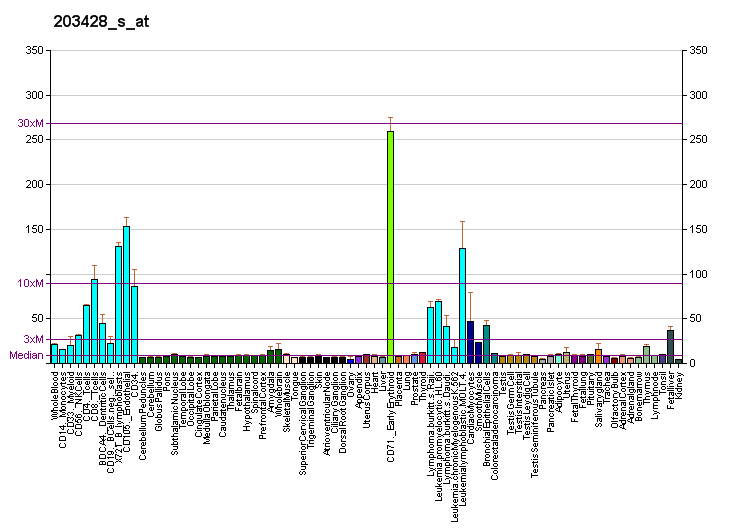

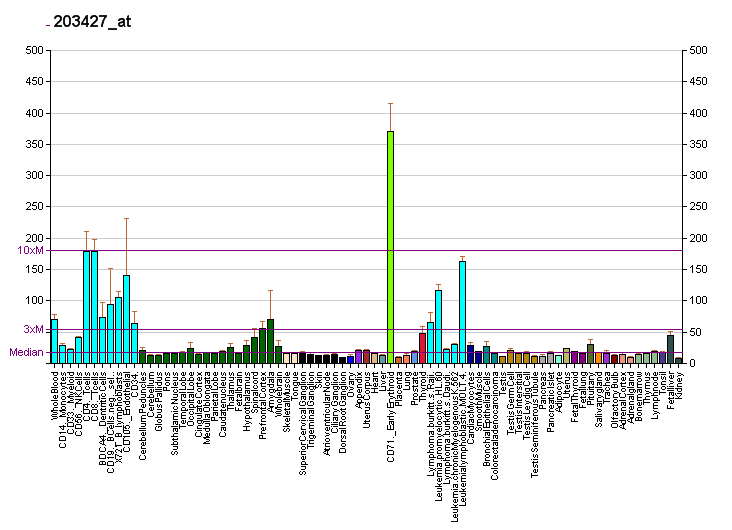
RNA expression pattern
Bgee	Human / Mouse (ortholog); Top expressed in: oocyte; secondary oocyte; internal globus pallidus; hair follicle; gonad; ganglionic eminence; Skeletal muscle tissue of biceps brachii; epithelium of nasopharynx; ventricular zone; Skeletal muscle tissue of rectus abdominis / Top expressed in: zygote; primary oocyte; medial ganglionic eminence; secondary oocyte; primitive streak; genital tubercle; mandibular prominence; abdominal wall; maxillary prominence; epiblast; More reference expression data
BioGPS	More reference expression data
Gene ontology
Molecular function	histone binding; chromatin binding; protein binding
Cellular component	nucleus; nucleoplasm; protein-containing complex
Biological process	DNA replication-dependent chromatin assembly; muscle cell differentiation; nucleosome assembly; regulation of transcription, DNA-templated; DNA repair; osteoblast differentiation; transcription, DNA-templated; chromatin organization
Sources:Amigo / QuickGO
Orthologs
Species	Human	Mouse
Entrez	25842	66403
Ensembl	ENSG00000111875	ENSMUSG00000019857
UniProt	Q9Y294	Q9CQE6
RefSeq (mRNA)	NM_014034	NM_025541
RefSeq (protein)	NP_054753	NP_079817
Location (UCSC)	Chr 6: 118.89 – 118.91 Mb	Chr 10: 53.47 – 53.49 Mb
PubMed search
- Wikidata
View/Edit Human	View/Edit Mouse

Histone chaperone ASF1A is a protein that in humans is encoded by the ASF1A gene.

== Function ==
This gene encodes a member of the H3/H4 family of histone chaperone proteins and is similar to the anti-silencing function-1 gene in yeast. The protein is a key component of a histone donor complex that functions in nucleosome assembly. It interacts with histones H3 and H4, and functions together with a chromatin assembly factor during DNA replication and repair.

== Interactions ==
ASF1A has been shown to interact with TLK1, TLK2, CHAF1B and CHAF1A.
