= Chromatin assembly factor 1 =

Protein complex

Steps in nucleosome assembly. CAF-1 is shown in yellow interacting with the H3-H4 tetramer.

Chromatin assembly factor-1 (CAF-1) is a protein complex — including Chaf1a (p150), Chaf1b (p60), and p48 subunits in humans, or Cac1, Cac2, and Cac3, respectively, in yeast— that assembles histone tetramers onto replicating DNA during the S phase of the cell cycle.

== Function ==
CAF-1 functions as a histone chaperone that mediates the first step in nucleosome formation by tetramerizing and depositing newly synthesized histone H3/H4 onto DNA rapidly behind replication forks. H3 and H4 are synthesized in the cytoplasm. Several studies have shown that the interaction between CAF-1 and PCNA (proliferating cell nuclear antigen, which stabilizes CAF-1 at replication forks, is important for CAF-1's role in nucleosome assembly

The three subunits work together to make the complex function. The human subunit (p150) interacts with PCNA, which acts as a sliding clamp, to help the CAF-1 complex interact with the DNA replication fork. Additionally, p150 along with PCNA performs nucleotide excision repair to fix any damaged DNA. P60 interacts with ASF1a/b, which is a histone chaperone for H3/H4. p48 has roles outside of CAF-1, but when involved with the complex, it binds to H4.

p60 attracts ASF1a/b which is a chaperone for H3/H4 and this is in the complex with p150 which interacts with PCNA to attach to the replication fork. The CAF-1 complex adds the histones to the DNA ahead of the replication fork.

A mutation in p150 that results in a loss of function would lead to double stranded breaks, interruptions in the replication fork and translocations. In p60, loss of function would mean the histone chaperone for H3/H4 would not interact with the complex. A mutation like this in either subunit would result in loss of function for the CAF-1 complex as a whole. However, loss of function in p48 would alter how well the complex is able to chaperone chromatin, but would not stop it as a whole.

== Roles ==
CAF-1 is required for the spatial organization and epigenetic marking of heterochromatin domains in pluripotent embryonic cells, creating a cellular memory of somatic cell identity during cellular differentiation.

Cells resembling 2-cell-stage mouse embryos (totipotent cells) can be induced in vitro through downregulation of the chromatin-assembly activity of CAF-1 in embryonic stem cells.

CAF-1 forms a deadenylase complex with CCR4-Not, which should not be confused with the unrelated CCR4. The CAF-1/CCR4-Not complex cooperates with the release factor eRF3 and PABPC1 to shorten the poly(A) tail of mRNA during translation.
