= TLK1 =

Protein-coding gene in the species Homo sapiens

Identifiers
- Aliases: TLK1, PKU-beta, tousled like kinase 1
- External IDs: OMIM: 608438; MGI: 2441683; GeneCards: TLK1
Enzyme activity
EC #	BRENDA	ExPASy	KEGG	MetaCyc
2.7.11.1	↗	↗	↗	↗

Gene location (Human)
Chr.	Chromosome 2 (human)
Band	2q31.1	Start	170,990,823 bp
Band	2q31.1	End	171,231,314 bp

Gene location (Mouse)
Chr.	Chromosome 2 (mouse)
Band	2|2 C2	Start	70,542,751 bp
Band	2|2 C2	End	70,656,072 bp
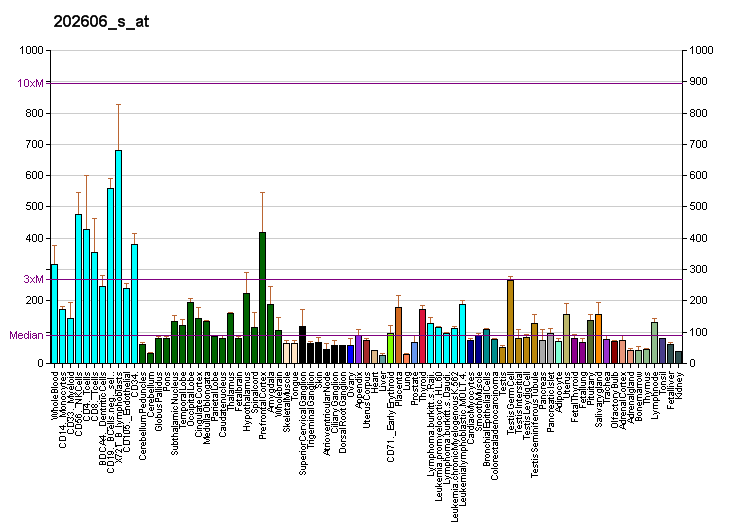

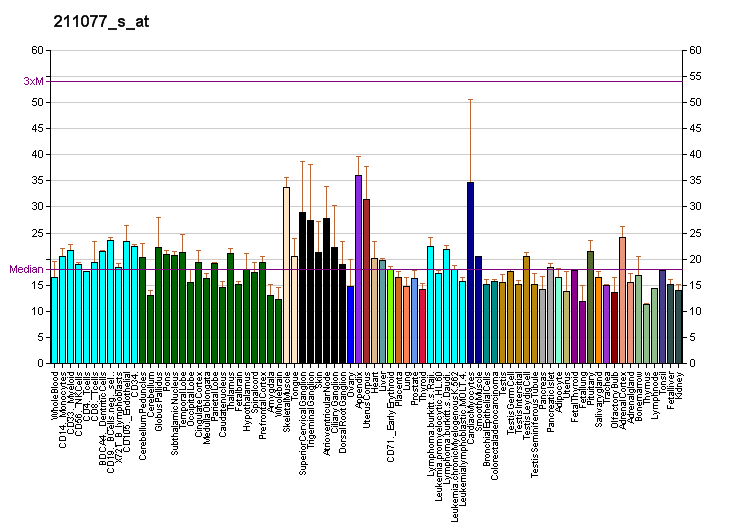

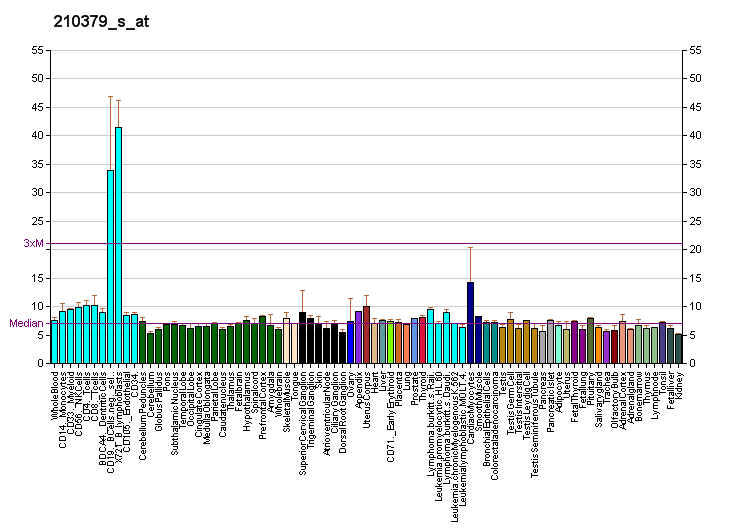
RNA expression pattern
Bgee	Human / Mouse (ortholog); Top expressed in: lateral nuclear group of thalamus; testicle; Achilles tendon; germinal epithelium; epithelium of nasopharynx; retinal pigment epithelium; mucosa of sigmoid colon; superficial temporal artery; Epithelium of choroid plexus; pars compacta / Top expressed in: hand; superior cervical ganglion; genital tubercle; renal corpuscle; tail of embryo; blood; medullary collecting duct; piriform cortex; foot; otolith organ; More reference expression data
BioGPS	More reference expression data
Gene ontology
Molecular function	transferase activity; nucleotide binding; protein serine/threonine kinase activity; protein kinase activity; protein binding; ATP binding; kinase activity
Cellular component	nucleus
Biological process	protein phosphorylation; cell cycle; intracellular signal transduction; intracellular protein transport; phosphorylation; cellular response to DNA damage stimulus; chromatin organization; chromosome segregation; peptidyl-serine phosphorylation
Sources:Amigo / QuickGO
Orthologs
Databases	NCBI: entry; OMA: entry
Species	Human	Mouse
Entrez	9874	228012
Ensembl	ENSG00000198586	ENSMUSG00000041997
UniProt	Q9UKI8	Q8C0V0
RefSeq (mRNA)	NM_001136554; NM_001136555; NM_012290	NM_172664; NM_001362963
RefSeq (protein)	NP_001130026; NP_001130027; NP_036422	NP_766252; NP_001349892
Location (UCSC)	Chr 2: 170.99 – 171.23 Mb	Chr 2: 70.54 – 70.66 Mb
PubMed search
- Wikidata
View/Edit Human	View/Edit Mouse

Serine/threonine-protein kinase tousled-like 1 is an enzyme that in humans is encoded by the TLK1 gene.

== Function ==
The Tousled-like kinases, first described in Arabidopsis, are nuclear serine/threonine kinases that are potentially involved in the regulation of chromatin assembly.[supplied by OMIM]

== Interactions ==
TLK1 has been shown to interact with ASF1B, ASF1A and TLK2.
