= Ververi–Brady syndrome =

- Other names: VERBAS, QRICH1-related intellectual disability-chondrodysplasia syndrome
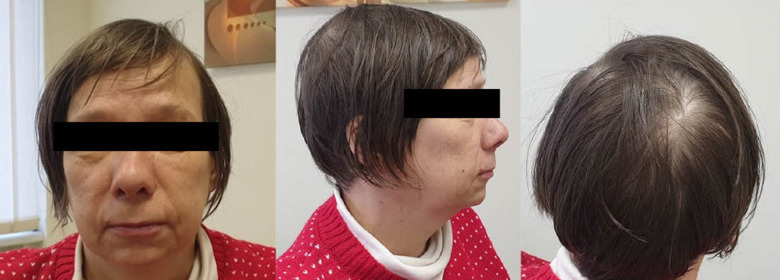
- Adult woman with VERBAS with characteristic facial features
- Symptoms: Mild intellectual disability, speech delays, microcephaly, chondrodysplasia, social interaction difficulties, variety of neurological symptoms
- Usual onset: Infancy
- Diagnostic method: Genetic testing
- Treatment: Educational supports if needed
- Frequency: Only 38 cases have been reported since discovery

Ververi–Brady syndrome (VERBAS) is a rare inherited disorder of unknown prevalence usually caused by a heterozygous mutation in the QRICH1 gene. This mutation has been observed as both inherited as well as de novo in patients. Ververi–Brady syndrome was first described by Athina Ververi in 2018. The syndrome features a broad spectrum of symptoms, but all patients generally have mild chondrodysplasia, developmental delays, and mild dysmorphic facial features such as prominent nose. As of January 2026, here have only been 42 reported cases.

== History ==
In 2018, three unrelated children who had similar symptoms of developmental delays, skeletal abnormalities, and mild dysmorphic facial features. The first patient had an autism diagnosis and mild skeletal abnormalities but was otherwise normal. The second patient had poor growth in infancy, difficulty walking, tremors, difficulty speaking, and needed to be homeschooled due to academic difficulties. The third patient had microcephaly, poor growth, and was slow to learn how to walk but was able to attend mainstream school. All three of these patients had a variety of dysmorphic facial features that none of the patients shared except for a prominent nose, wide mouth, and thin upper lip. They were identified as having a de novo mutation on their QRICH1 gene.

In 2019, 2 unrelated children were identified as having VERBAS and were found to have subtle chondrodysplasia.

In 2021, Fohrenbach et al. described 4 unrelated patients with VERBAS. One patient, a three-year-old, developed nephroblastoma and died from complications, suggesting that increased cancer risk may be a part of the syndrome.

In 2023, a 17-year-old girl was suffering from seizures and leukodystrophy. The girl had a history of minor developmental delays and was thought to have a perinatal brain injury resulting in mild right-side paresis. Her mother shared similar dysmorphic facial features, short stature, and distractable nature, causing them to be referred to a genecist. It was discovered that they both carried a novel QRICH1-related mutation and were diagnosed with VERBRAS. Previously, all cases of VERBRAS were de novo.

== Symptoms ==
Veriveri–Brady syndrome has a broad spectrum of variable symptoms, but symptoms that have been observed in all patients are:

- Short stature as a result of chondrodysplasia.
- Growth plate abnormalities
- Developmental delays, specifically in language and walking.
- Difficulty with social interaction.
- A variety of mild dysmorphic features, with all patients having a prominent nose, thin upper lip, and a wide mouth. Many patients also have ptosis and wide set eyes.
- ADHD-like symptoms, such as inattentiveness, hyperactivity, and forgetfulness.
- Difficulty walking, whether from skeletal issues or neurological issues.

Many patients have been observed as having mild intellectual disability, microcephaly, hypotonia, and autism. Patients may also have other neurological symptoms such as tremors, unsteady gait, poor reflexes, and seizures. A couple of patients had elevated levels of creatine kinase during infancy that later went down to normal.

It's suspected there may be an increased risk of cancer, genitourinary issues, and cardiac issues, but, due to the apparent rareness of VERBAS, it's unclear if there is any connection to VERBAS.

== Causes ==
VERBAS is usually caused by a nonsense mutation on the QRICH1 gene that happens sporadically. In 2023 a new autosomal-dominant gene was identified that was passed down from a mother to her daughter.

== Treatment ==
There is no cure for VERBAS. In almost all cases, people with VERBAS are able to attend mainstream school with or without supports. Due to the lack of research and rareness of the disorder, there are no developed treatments for it and all treatments are symptomatic.
