= ASF1B =

Protein-coding gene in the species Homo sapiens

Available structures
PDB	Ortholog search: PDBe RCSB
PDB	List of PDB id codes 5BNX, 5BO0

Identifiers
- Aliases: ASF1B, CIA-II, anti-silencing function 1B histone chaperone
- External IDs: OMIM: 609190; MGI: 1914179; HomoloGene: 56797; GeneCards: ASF1B; OMA:ASF1B - orthologs

Gene location (Human)
Chr.	Chromosome 19 (human)
Band	19p13.12	Start	14,119,512 bp
Band	19p13.12	End	14,136,613 bp

Gene location (Mouse)
Chr.	Chromosome 8 (mouse)
Band	8|8 C2	Start	84,682,136 bp
Band	8|8 C2	End	84,696,826 bp
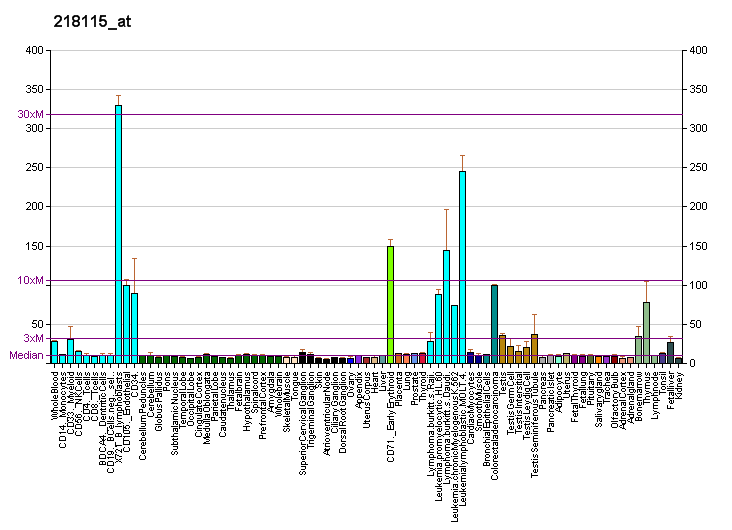
RNA expression pattern
Bgee	Human / Mouse (ortholog); Top expressed in: right testis; left testis; mucosa of transverse colon; gonad; testicle; ventricular zone; blood; rectum; lymph node; bone marrow / Top expressed in: fetal liver hematopoietic progenitor cell; secondary oocyte; zygote; tibiofemoral joint; primary oocyte; otic placode; thymus; somite; condyle; endothelial cell of lymphatic vessel; More reference expression data
BioGPS	More reference expression data
Gene ontology
Molecular function	histone binding; protein binding
Cellular component	chromatin; nucleus; nucleoplasm; protein-containing complex
Biological process	multicellular organism development; DNA replication-dependent chromatin assembly; nucleosome assembly; cell differentiation; regulation of transcription, DNA-templated; transcription, DNA-templated; spermatogenesis; chromatin organization; blastocyst hatching
Sources:Amigo / QuickGO
Orthologs
Species	Human	Mouse
Entrez	55723	66929
Ensembl	ENSG00000105011; ENSG00000288210	ENSMUSG00000005470
UniProt	Q9NVP2	Q9DAP7
RefSeq (mRNA)	NM_018154	NM_024184
RefSeq (protein)	NP_060624	NP_077146
Location (UCSC)	Chr 19: 14.12 – 14.14 Mb	Chr 8: 84.68 – 84.7 Mb
PubMed search
- Wikidata
View/Edit Human	View/Edit Mouse

Histone chaperone ASF1B is a protein that in humans is encoded by the ASF1B gene.

== Function ==
This gene encodes a member of the H3/H4 family of histone chaperone proteins and is similar to the anti-silencing function-1 gene in yeast. The encoded protein is the substrate of the tousled-like kinase family of cell cycle-regulated kinases, and may play a key role in modulating the nucleosome structure of chromatin by ensuring a constant supply of histones at sites of nucleosome assembly.

== Interactions ==
ASF1B has been shown to interact with TLK2, CHAF1B, TLK1 and CHAF1A.
