= ATF7IP =

Protein-coding gene in the species Homo sapiens

Identifiers
- Aliases: ATF7IP, AM, ATF-IP, MCAF, MCAF1, p621, activating transcription factor 7 interacting protein
- External IDs: OMIM: 613644; MGI: 1858965; GeneCards: ATF7IP
Available structures
PDB	Ortholog search: PDBe RCSB
PDB	List of PDB id codes 2RPQ

Gene location (Human)
Chr.	Chromosome 12 (human)
Band	12p13.1	Start	14,365,632 bp
Band	12p13.1	End	14,502,935 bp

Gene location (Mouse)
Chr.	Chromosome 6 (mouse)
Band	6|6 G1	Start	136,506,167 bp
Band	6|6 G1	End	136,610,862 bp
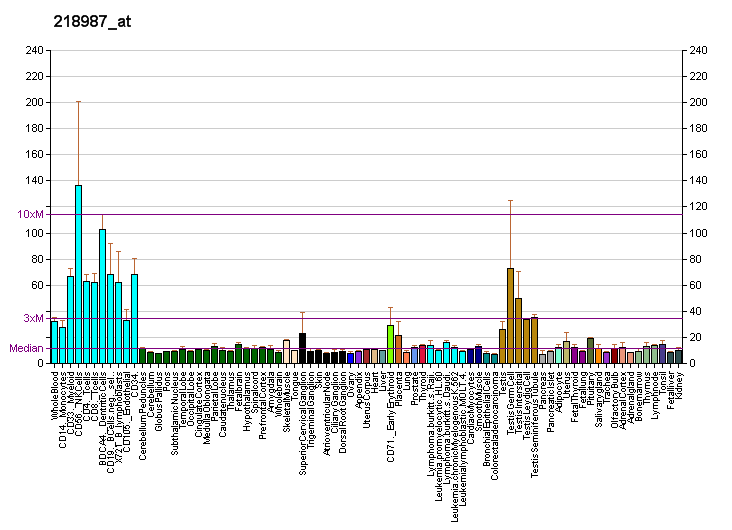
RNA expression pattern
Bgee	Human / Mouse (ortholog); Top expressed in: buccal mucosa cell; cardia; nipple; tendon of biceps brachii; renal medulla; visceral pleura; pylorus; ventral tegmental area; superior surface of tongue; trigeminal ganglion / Top expressed in: zygote; genital tubercle; tail of embryo; trigeminal ganglion; interventricular septum; lymph node; mesenteric lymph nodes; lobe of cerebellum; cerebellar vermis; secondary oocyte; More reference expression data
BioGPS	More reference expression data
Gene ontology
Molecular function	ATPase activity; protein binding; transcription corepressor activity
Cellular component	nucleus; transcription regulator complex; nucleoplasm; cytosol; nuclear body
Biological process	positive regulation of transcription, DNA-templated; DNA methylation; regulation of RNA polymerase II transcription preinitiation complex assembly; viral process; negative regulation of transcription, DNA-templated; regulation of transcription, DNA-templated; negative regulation of transcription by RNA polymerase II; transcription, DNA-templated; regulation of protein stability; protein stabilization; positive regulation of DNA methylation-dependent heterochromatin assembly
Sources:Amigo / QuickGO
Orthologs
Databases	NCBI: entry; OMA: entry
Species	Human	Mouse
Entrez	55729	54343
Ensembl	ENSG00000171681	ENSMUSG00000030213
UniProt	Q6VMQ6	Q7TT18
RefSeq (mRNA)	NM_001286514; NM_001286515; NM_018179; NM_181352	NM_019426
RefSeq (protein)	NP_001273443; NP_001273444; NP_060649; NP_851997; NP_060649.3	NP_062299; NP_001375123; NP_001375124; NP_001375125; NP_001375126
Location (UCSC)	Chr 12: 14.37 – 14.5 Mb	Chr 6: 136.51 – 136.61 Mb
PubMed search
- Wikidata
View/Edit Human	View/Edit Mouse

Activating transcription factor 7-interacting protein 1 is a protein that in humans is encoded by the ATF7IP gene.

== Interactions ==
ATF7IP has been shown to interact with MBD1. In mice with T cell-specific deletion of Atf7ip, the protein has been shown to play a role in regulating T helper 17 cell (Th17) differentiation due to increased IL-2 production upon stimulation of the T cell receptor (TCR). This TCR stimulation occurs through deposition of H3K9me3, a repressive histone mark.
