= CHAF1B =

Protein-coding gene in humans

Identifiers
- Aliases: CHAF1B, CAF-1, CAF-IP60, CAF1, CAF1A, CAF1P60, MPHOSPH7, MPP7, chromatin assembly factor 1 subunit B
- External IDs: OMIM: 601245; MGI: 1314881; GeneCards: CHAF1B

Gene location (Human)
Chr.	Chromosome 21 (human)
Band	21q22.12-q22.13	Start	36,385,392 bp
Band	21q22.12-q22.13	End	36,419,015 bp

Gene location (Mouse)
Chr.	Chromosome 16 (mouse)
Band	16 C4|16 54.96 cM	Start	93,680,789 bp
Band	16 C4|16 54.96 cM	End	93,703,003 bp
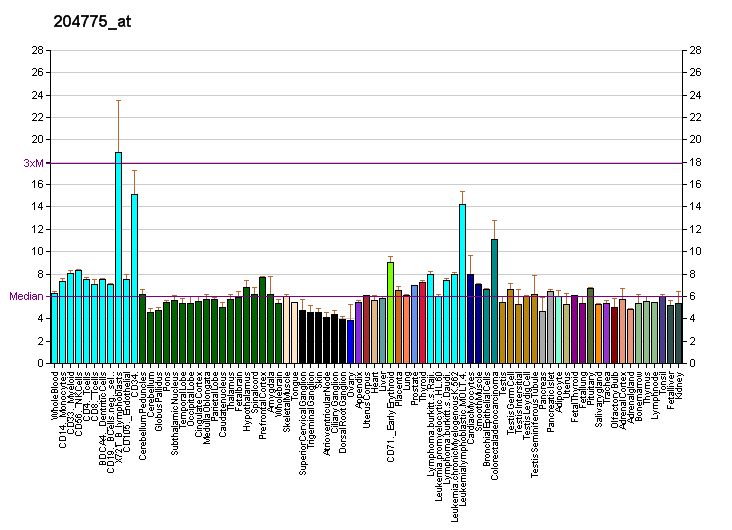
RNA expression pattern
Bgee	Human / Mouse (ortholog); Top expressed in: secondary oocyte; gastrocnemius muscle; muscle of thigh; ventricular zone; ganglionic eminence; buccal mucosa cell; testicle; stromal cell of endometrium; gonad; skeletal muscle tissue / Top expressed in: embryo; epiblast; genital tubercle; primitive streak; tail of embryo; embryo; abdominal wall; ventricular zone; morula; yolk sac; More reference expression data
BioGPS	More reference expression data
Gene ontology
Molecular function	unfolded protein binding; histone binding; chromatin binding; protein binding
Cellular component	cytoplasm; cytosol; CAF-1 complex; nucleoplasm; nucleus; protein-containing complex
Biological process	regulation of transcription, DNA-templated; transcription, DNA-templated; cellular response to DNA damage stimulus; DNA replication-dependent chromatin assembly; DNA replication; cell cycle; DNA repair; nucleosome assembly
Sources:Amigo / QuickGO
Orthologs
Databases	NCBI: entry; OMA: entry
Species	Human	Mouse
Entrez	8208	110749
Ensembl	ENSG00000159259	ENSMUSG00000022945
UniProt	Q13112	Q9D0N7
RefSeq (mRNA)	NM_005441	NM_028083
RefSeq (protein)	NP_005432	NP_082359
Location (UCSC)	Chr 21: 36.39 – 36.42 Mb	Chr 16: 93.68 – 93.7 Mb
PubMed search
- Wikidata
View/Edit Human	View/Edit Mouse

Chromatin assembly factor 1 subunit B is a protein that in humans is encoded by the CHAF1B gene.

== Function ==
Chromatin assembly factor I (CAF-1) is required for the assembly of histone octamers onto newly-replicated DNA. CAF-I is composed of three protein subunits, p50, p60, and p150. The protein encoded by this gene corresponds to the p60 subunit and is required for chromatin assembly after replication. The encoded protein is differentially phosphorylated in a cell cycle-dependent manner. In addition, it is normally found in the nucleus except during mitosis, when it is released into the cytoplasm. This protein is a member of the WD-repeat HIR1 family and may also be involved in DNA repair.

== Interactions ==
CHAF1B has been shown to interact with:

- ASF1A,
- ASF1B, and
- BAZ1B.
