= MBD1 =

Protein-coding gene in the species Homo sapiens

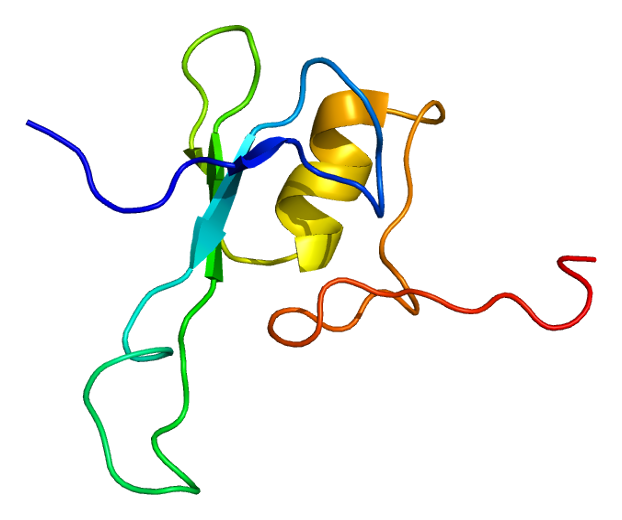

Identifiers
- Aliases: MBD1, CXXC3, PCM1, RFT, methyl-CpG binding domain protein 1
- External IDs: OMIM: 156535; MGI: 1333811; GeneCards: MBD1
Available structures
PDB	Ortholog search: PDBe RCSB
PDB	List of PDB id codes 1IG4, 1D9N, 4D4W

Gene location (Human)
Chr.	Chromosome 18 (human)
Band	18q21.1	Start	50,266,882 bp
Band	18q21.1	End	50,281,774 bp

Gene location (Mouse)
Chr.	Chromosome 18 (mouse)
Band	18 E2|18 50.7 cM	Start	74,400,676 bp
Band	18 E2|18 50.7 cM	End	74,415,803 bp
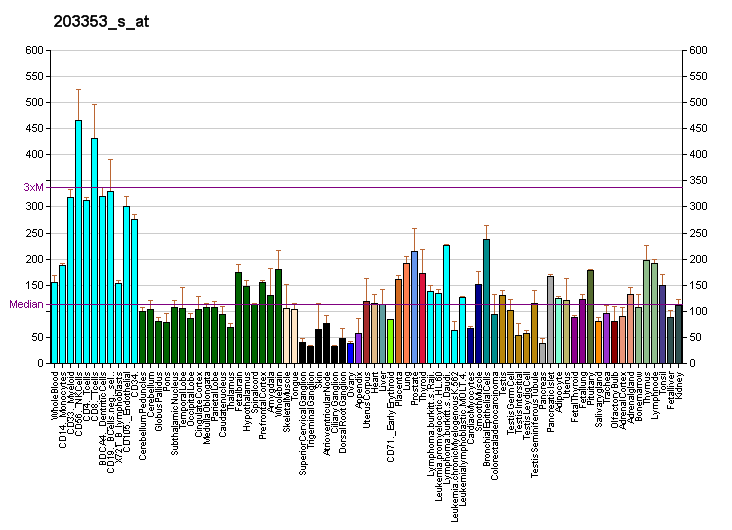

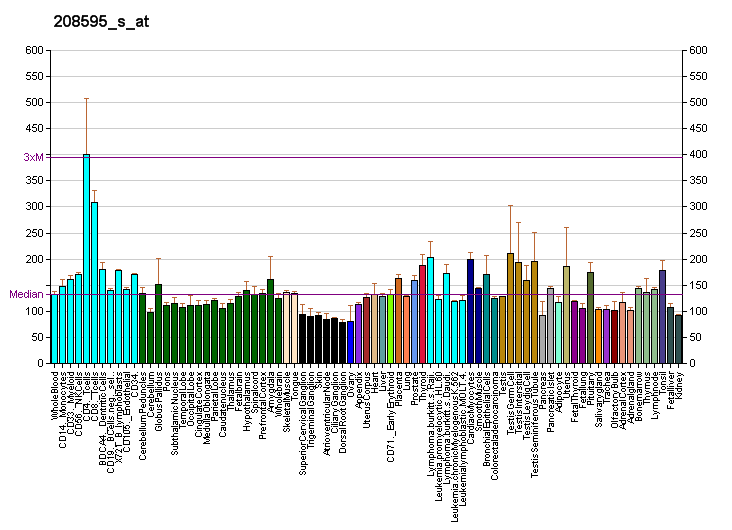
RNA expression pattern
Bgee	Human / Mouse (ortholog); Top expressed in: left testis; right testis; parotid gland; pituitary gland; anterior pituitary; skin of leg; middle temporal gyrus; left ovary; right lobe of thyroid gland; right ovary / Top expressed in: lacrimal gland; lobe of prostate; left lobe of liver; left colon; neural layer of retina; vestibular membrane of cochlear duct; lumbar subsegment of spinal cord; tibiofemoral joint; thymus; parotid gland; More reference expression data
BioGPS	More reference expression data
Gene ontology
Molecular function	DNA binding; double-stranded methylated DNA binding; zinc ion binding; metal ion binding; protein binding; methyl-CpG binding; DNA-binding transcription factor activity, RNA polymerase II-specific
Cellular component	nuclear speck; nuclear matrix; chromosome; nucleus; nucleoplasm
Biological process	regulation of transcription, DNA-templated; transcription by RNA polymerase II; transcription, DNA-templated; negative regulation of transcription, DNA-templated; regulation of transcription by RNA polymerase II; negative regulation of transcription by RNA polymerase II; DNA methylation-dependent heterochromatin assembly
Sources:Amigo / QuickGO
Orthologs
Databases	NCBI: entry; OMA: entry
Species	Human	Mouse
Entrez	4152	17190
Ensembl	ENSG00000141644	ENSMUSG00000024561
UniProt	Q9UIS9	Q9Z2E2
RefSeq (mRNA)	NM_001204136; NM_001204137; NM_001204138; NM_001204139; NM_001204140 NM_001204141; NM_001204142; NM_001204143; NM_001204151; NM_002384; NM_015844; NM_015845; NM_015846; NM_015847; NM_001323942; NM_001323947; NM_001323949; NM_001323950; NM_001323951; NM_001323952; NM_001323953; NM_001323954	NM_013594; NM_001357421; NM_001357422; NM_001357423
RefSeq (protein)	NP_001191065; NP_001191066; NP_001191067; NP_001191068; NP_001191069 NP_001191070; NP_001191071; NP_001191072; NP_001191080; NP_001310871; NP_001310876; NP_001310878; NP_001310879; NP_001310880; NP_001310881; NP_001310882; NP_001310883; NP_002375; NP_056669; NP_056670; NP_056671; NP_056723	NP_038622; NP_001344350; NP_001344351; NP_001344352; NP_001389818 NP_001389819; NP_001389820; NP_001389821; NP_001389823; NP_001389824
Location (UCSC)	Chr 18: 50.27 – 50.28 Mb	Chr 18: 74.4 – 74.42 Mb
PubMed search
- Wikidata
View/Edit Human	View/Edit Mouse

Methyl-CpG-binding domain protein 1 is a protein that in humans is encoded by the MBD1 gene. The protein encoded by MBD1 binds to methylated sequences in DNA, and thereby influences transcription. It binds to a variety of methylated sequences, and appears to mediate repression of gene expression. It has been shown to play a role in chromatin modification through interaction with the histone H3K9 methyltransferase SETDB1. H3K9me3 is a repressive modification.

== Function ==
DNA methylation is the major modification of eukaryotic genomes and plays an essential role in mammalian development. Human proteins MECP2, MBD1, MBD2, MBD3, and MBD4 comprise a family of nuclear proteins related by the presence in each of a methyl-CpG binding domain (MBD). Each of these proteins, with the exception of MBD3, is capable of binding specifically to methylated DNA. MECP2, MBD1 and MBD2 can also repress transcription from methylated gene promoters. Five transcript variants of the MBD1 are generated by alternative splicing resulting in protein isoforms that contain one MBD domain, two to three cysteine-rich (CXXC) domains, and some differences in the COOH terminus. All five transcript variants repress transcription from methylated promoters; in addition, variants with three CXXC domains also repress unmethylated promoter activity. MBD1 and MBD2 map very close to each other on chromosome 18q21.

== Interactions ==
MBD1 has been shown to interact with ATF7IP, CBX5, CHAF1A and SUV39H1.
