= Irene Uchida =

Canadian scientist and Down Syndrome researcher

Irene Ayako Uchida
- Born: April 8, 1917; Vancouver, British Columbia, Canada
- Died: July 30, 2013 (aged 96); Toronto, Ontario, Canada
- Education: University of British Columbia; University of Toronto
- Occupation: Geneticist

Irene Ayako Uchida, OC (April 8, 1917 – July 30, 2013) was a Canadian scientist and Down syndrome researcher.

Born in Vancouver, Uchida initially studied English literature at the University of British Columbia. As a child and teenager, she played violin and piano, and was described as "outgoing" and "social." In 1940, she and two sisters visited her mother and youngest sister in Japan. She returned to Canada in November 1941, one month before Pearl Harbor.

In Canada, she and her family were forcibly removed and incarcerated at a Canadian concentration camp in the Slocan Valley during World War II.

In 1944 Uchida, continued her studies at the University of Toronto where she wanted to get a master's degree in social work. Her professors encouraged her to pursue a career in genetics, and as a result, she completed PhD in human genetics at the University of Toronto in 1951 and worked at the Hospital for Sick Children in Toronto. At the Hospital for Sick Children, she studied twins and children with Down syndrome. In the 1960s she helped identify the link between pregnant women who had undergone abdominal X-rays and chromosomal birth defects such as Down syndrome in their subsequent pregnancies. She was also amongst those researchers in the 1960s who showed that the extra chromosome associated with Down Syndrome is not always from the mother, but the father may be responsible for 25 per cent of the births.

In 1960 she became the director of the Department of Medical Genetics at the Children's Hospital in Winnipeg and became a professor at the University of Manitoba (National Library of Canada and National Archives of Canada, 1997). She moved to McMaster University in 1969, founding the cytogenetics laboratory. She became a professor in the pediatrics and pathology departments until leaving for Oshawa General Hospital to direct the cytogenetics laboratory in 1991.

In 1993, she was made an Officer of the Order of Canada for "her research on radiation and human chromosome abnormalities [that] has made a notable contribution to medical science".

== Early life ==
Irene Uchida, the daughter of Japanese immigrants, was born in Vancouver, B.C., Canada. She has been described as feisty, fun-loving, and opinionated. Though originally named "Ayako," which means "Splendid" in Japanese, Irene's piano teacher found it too difficult to pronounce and so gave her the name "Irene." Irene was an accomplished musician who played violin and organ, in addition to the piano.

During her childhood in Vancouver, Irene experienced the tragic loss of her best friend in a traffic accident. Around this same time, she also lost her sister Sachi who died of Tuberculosis. These losses instilled in Irene the desire to help people, which is something she worked toward for the rest of her life.

== Education ==
Irene's parents owned two bookstores, so it is fitting that after high school she went on to study English literature at the University of British Columbia. Her education was interrupted, however, after she travelled with her mother and sisters to Japan in 1941. She returned on the last ship back to Canada before Pearl Harbor, her mother and sisters remaining in Japan. After Pearl Harbor, intense anti-Japanese bias led Canada to enact the War Measures Act in February 1942. This led to the forced removal and incarceration of over 20,000 Japanese Canadians, including Irene and her family who were incarcerated at a Canadian concentration camp at Christina Lake, British Columbia.

While incarcerated at camp, Irene was asked to be the principal of a school for children of internees because of her university education. After her father chose to return to his wife in Japan an exchange for Allied prisoners of war, Irene accepted the support of the United Church, which offered her a place to stay and encouraged her to finish her degree at the University of Toronto. Uchida earned a Bachelor of Arts in 1946, intending to continue her education by getting a master's degree in social work.

The support and encouragement of one of her professors, Norma Ford Walker, head of the Department of Zoology but soon to become the director of a newly formed Department of Genetics at the Hospital for Sick Children in Toronto, however, influenced Uchida to instead pursue the field of human genetics. In 1951 she completed her PhD in zoology.

== Career ==
After she finished her PhD, Uchida went to work at the Hospital for Sick Children in Toronto and began studying twins and children with Down syndrome, which was the most common severe birth abnormality at the time. She spent a year working on Drosophila chromosomes, training with Dr. Klaus Patau at the University of Wisconsin, who later discovered trisomy 13, initially dubbed Patau's syndrome.

In 1960, Dr. Uchida was appointed Director of the Department of Medical Genetics at the Children's Hospital in Winnipeg, Manitoba, and began teaching at the University of Manitoba. After scientists in France discovered that people with Down syndrome had 47 chromosomes instead of the normal 46, she decided to investigate the cause of the extra chromosome. Cytogenetics, the study of chromosomes in cells, focuses on the identification and behavior of chromosomes, and Dr. Uchida was the first scientist to bring this technique to Canada. During ward rounds in the nursery to discuss the cytogenetics of Down syndrome as well as a birth-defect syndrome found to be caused by trisomy 18, Dr. Uchida investigated the possibility of a newborn with this birth defect. She persuaded her lab, then studying chromosomes of fruit flies, to study the chromosomes from the blood sample taken from the nursery, found trisomy, and started Canada's first clinical cytogenetics program.

In her career as a professor at the University of Manitoba, Dr. Uchida facilitated two studies to investigate a possible connection between extensive maternal radiation and Down syndrome births. The studies she conducted involved 972 children in each category studied, and she found strong evidence that abdominal x-ray exposure led to nondisjunction in their pregnancies and risk of birth defects.

In 1970, Dr. Uchida founded the Cytogenetics Laboratory at McMaster University in Hamilton, Ontario. Her expertise in genetics led to her becoming the President of the American Society of Human Genetics in 1960, a member of the Science Council of Canada from 1970 to 1973, a member of the Advisory Committee on Genetic Services for Ontario in 1979, a consultant to the American Board of Medical Genetics in 1980, and a member of the Canadian College of Medical Geneticists from 1980 to 1984, among other things.

Dr. Uchida was the director of the Cytogenetics Laboratory in Oshawa, Ontario, and was responsible for diagnosing chromosome differences in patients with abnormalities and developmental disabilities as well as diagnosed irregularities in the chromosomes of fetuses.

Dr. Uchida published more than 95 scientific papers and received numerous awards for her research including Woman of the Century 1867-1967 for Manitoba and the Order of Canada in 1993.

== Death ==
After suffering from Alzheimer's disease for over a decade, Irene died in a nursing home in Toronto on July 30, 2013, at the age of 96. She left us many discoveries.
