= MED13 =

Protein-coding gene in the species Homo sapiens

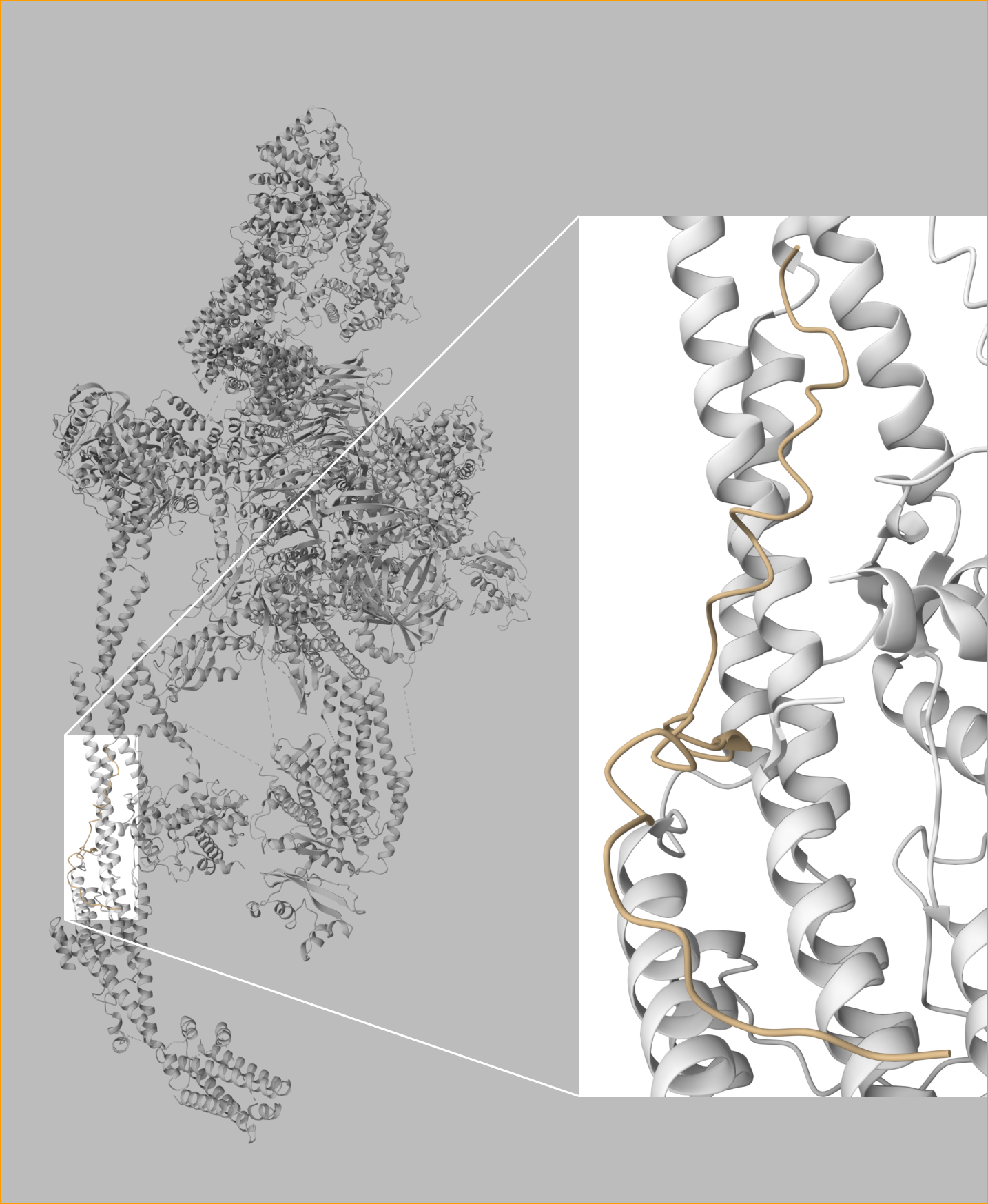

Identifiers
- Aliases: MED13, ARC250, DRIP250, HSPC221, THRAP1, TRAP240, mediator complex subunit 13, MRD61
- External IDs: OMIM: 603808; MGI: 3029632; GeneCards: MED13

Gene location (Human)
Chr.	Chromosome 17 (human)
Band	17q23.2	Start	61,942,605 bp
Band	17q23.2	End	62,065,278 bp

Gene location (Mouse)
Chr.	Chromosome 11 (mouse)
Band	11|11 C	Start	86,157,859 bp
Band	11|11 C	End	86,248,428 bp
RNA expression pattern
Bgee	Human / Mouse (ortholog); Top expressed in: endothelial cell; visceral pleura; germinal epithelium; dorsal motor nucleus of vagus nerve; secondary oocyte; mucosa of paranasal sinus; parietal pleura; buccal mucosa cell; tibia; pylorus / Top expressed in: hand; pineal gland; genital tubercle; tail of embryo; otolith organ; mesenteric lymph nodes; utricle; retinal pigment epithelium; medial ganglionic eminence; Rostral migratory stream; More reference expression data
BioGPS	n/a
Gene ontology
Molecular function	transcription coactivator activity; transcription coregulator activity; thyroid hormone receptor binding; nuclear receptor coactivator activity; vitamin D receptor binding; signaling receptor activity
Cellular component	membrane; mediator complex; nucleus; nucleoplasm
Biological process	androgen receptor signaling pathway; regulation of transcription, DNA-templated; regulation of transcription by RNA polymerase II; intracellular steroid hormone receptor signaling pathway; transcription, DNA-templated; positive regulation of transcription, DNA-templated; cholesterol homeostasis; transcription initiation from RNA polymerase II promoter; triglyceride homeostasis; positive regulation of transcription by RNA polymerase II; negative regulation of DNA-binding transcription factor activity
Sources:Amigo / QuickGO
Orthologs
Databases	NCBI: entry; OMA: entry
Species	Human	Mouse
Entrez	9969	327987
Ensembl	ENSG00000108510	ENSMUSG00000034297
UniProt	Q9UHV7	Q5SWW4
RefSeq (mRNA)	NM_005121	NM_001080931
RefSeq (protein)	NP_005112	NP_001074400
Location (UCSC)	Chr 17: 61.94 – 62.07 Mb	Chr 11: 86.16 – 86.25 Mb
PubMed search
- Wikidata
View/Edit Human	View/Edit Mouse

Mediator complex subunit 13 is a protein that in humans is encoded by the MED13 gene.

== Function ==
This gene encodes a component of the mediator complex (also known as TRAP, SMCC, DRIP, or ARC), a transcriptional coactivator complex thought to be required for the expression of almost all genes. The mediator complex is recruited by transcriptional activators or nuclear receptors to induce gene expression, possibly by interacting with RNA polymerase II and promoting the formation of a transcriptional pre-initiation complex. The product of this gene is proposed to form a sub-complex with MED12, cyclin C, and CDK8 that can negatively regulate transactivation by mediator.
