= Opitz =

Opitz is a surname. Notable people with the surname include:

- Franz K. Opitz, Swiss painter
- John M. Opitz, American geneticist
- Lucille Opitz, German speed skater
- Mark Opitz, Australian record producer
- Martin Opitz, German poet
- Max Opitz (1890–1982), German communist politician
- Michael Opitz, German footballer
- Reinhard Opitz, German left-wing intellectual and social scientist
- Rudolf Opitz, German lithographer
- Simone Opitz, East German cross country skier
- Ted Opitz, Canadian politician

== See also ==
- Smith–Lemli–Opitz syndrome, a metabolic and developmental disorder
- Opitz trigonocephaly syndrome, type of cephalic disorder
- Opitz–Kaveggia syndrome, genetic syndrome
- Autosomal dominant opitz G/BBB syndrome, disorder caused by the deletion of a small piece of chromosome 22
