= Cyclin-dependent kinase 19 =

Enzyme found in humans

CDK19

Identifiers
- Aliases: CDK19, CDC2L6, CDK11, bA346C16.3, cyclin-dependent kinase 19, cyclin dependent kinase 19, DEE87, EIEE87
- External IDs: OMIM: 614720; MGI: 1925584; GeneCards: CDK19
Enzyme activity
| EC # | BRENDA | ExPASy | KEGG | MetaCyc |
|---|---|---|---|---|
| 2.7.11.22 | ↗ | ↗ | ↗ | ↗ |

Gene location (Human)
| Chr. | Chromosome 6 (human) |
| Band | 6q21 | Start | 110,609,978 bp |
| Band | 6q21 | End | 110,815,958 bp |

Gene location (Mouse)
| Chr. | Chromosome 10 (mouse) |
| Band | 10|10 B1 | Start | 40,215,560 bp |
| Band | 10|10 B1 | End | 40,359,814 bp |
RNA expression pattern
| Bgee | Human / Mouse (ortholog); Top expressed in: endothelial cell; internal globus pallidus; corpus callosum; optic nerve; external globus pallidus; inferior olivary nucleus; inferior ganglion of vagus nerve; middle frontal gyrus; C1 segment; ganglionic eminence / Top expressed in: otolith organ; utricle; vestibular membrane of cochlear duct; hand; stria vascularis; lobe of cerebellum; neural layer of retina; prostate; blood; sciatic nerve; More reference expression data |
| BioGPS | n/a |
Gene ontology
| Molecular function | kinase activity; transferase activity; nucleotide binding; protein kinase activity; protein serine/threonine kinase activity; ATP binding; cyclin-dependent protein serine/threonine kinase activity; enzyme binding |
| Cellular component | nucleus; cytosol; mediator complex |
| Biological process | positive regulation of inflammatory response; cellular response to lipopolysaccharide; phosphorylation; positive regulation of apoptotic process; protein phosphorylation; regulation of mitotic cell cycle; regulation of cell cycle |
Sources:Amigo / QuickGO
Orthologs
| Databases | NCBI: entry; OMA: entry |
| Species | Human | Mouse |
| Entrez | 23097 | 78334 |
| Ensembl | ENSG00000155111 | ENSMUSG00000038481 |
| UniProt | Q9BWU1 | Q8BWD8 |
| RefSeq (mRNA) | NM_001300960; NM_001300963; NM_001300964; NM_015076 | NM_001168304; NM_001291816; NM_001291817; NM_198164 |
| RefSeq (protein) | NP_001287889; NP_001287892; NP_001287893; NP_055891 | NP_001161776; NP_001278745; NP_001278746; NP_937807 |
| Location (UCSC) | Chr 6: 110.61 – 110.82 Mb | Chr 10: 40.22 – 40.36 Mb |
| PubMed search |
- Wikidata
| View/Edit Human | View/Edit Mouse |

Cyclin-dependent kinase 19 (or CDK19) is an enzyme that in humans is encoded by the CDK19 gene.

== Inhibitors ==
The natural product cortistatin A is a potent and selective inhibitor of CDK8 and CDK19.

Romaciclib is a dual CDK8 and CDK19 inhibitor which is being developed for the treatment of acute myeloid leukaemia (AML).
