= CCNC =

CCNC may refer to:

- Chinese Canadian National Council, a Canadian organisation
- Country Club of North Carolina, a gated golf community in Pinehurst, North Carolina, United States
- Cyclin-C, encoded by the CCNC gene
