= John M. Opitz =

German-American geneticist (1935–2023)

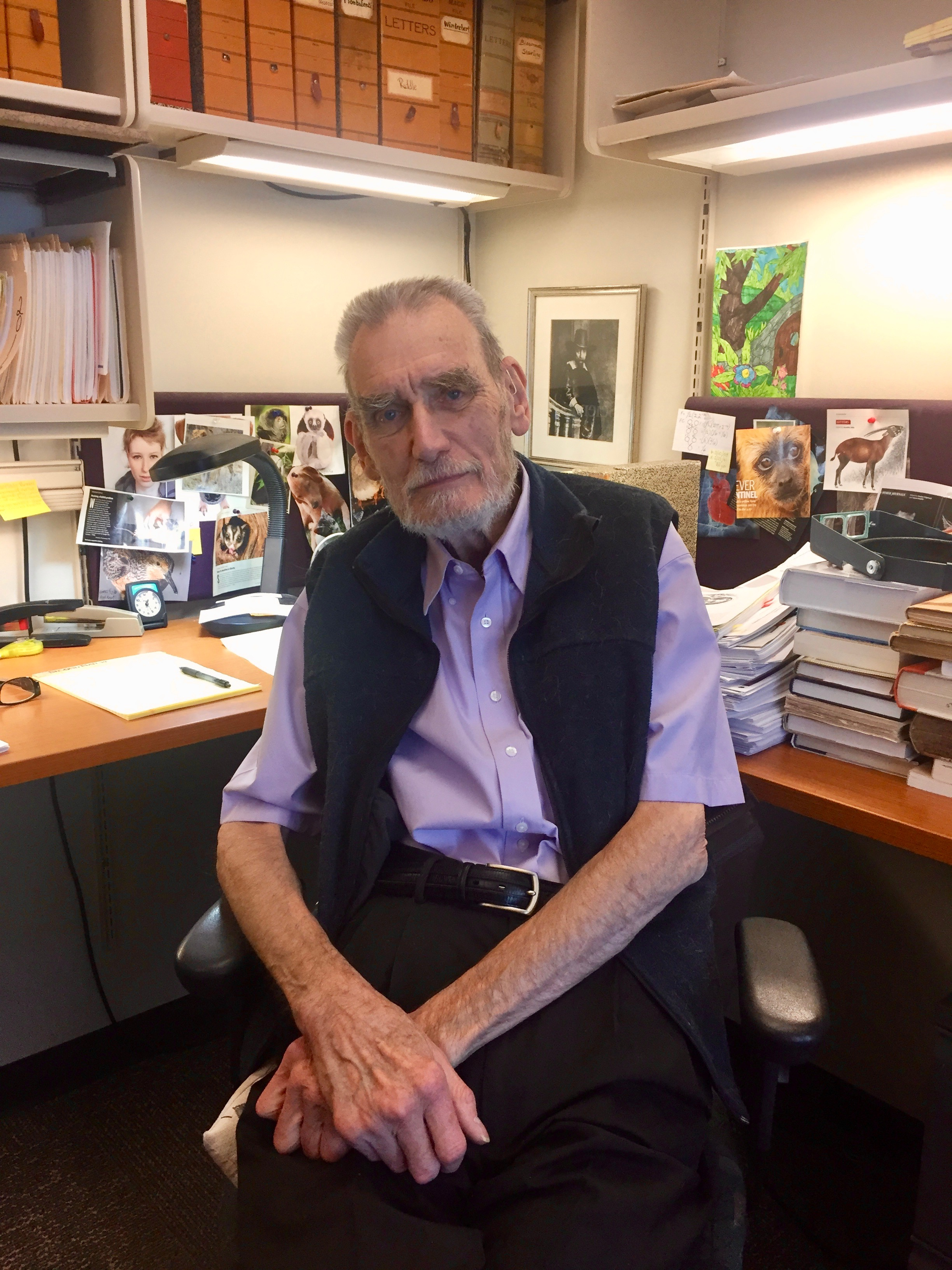
- Opitz in 2017
- Born: John Marius Opitz; August 15, 1935; Hamburg, Germany
- Died: August 31, 2023 (aged 88); Salt Lake City, Utah
- Citizenship: Naturalized Citizen
- Education: BA - University of Iowa MD - University of Iowa
- Occupation: Pediatrics
- Known for: FG Syndrome Smith-Lemli-Opitz Syndrome (SLOS) American Journal of Medical Genetics
- Medical career
- Profession: Medical Geneticist
- Institutions: University of Wisconsin Montana State University Shodair Hospital University of Utah
- Research: Genetics Pathology Developmental Biology
- Awards: William Allan Award of ASHG Medal of Honor of the DGofH (German Society of Hum Genet) German Academy of Science Leopoldina

John M. Opitz (August 15, 1935 – August 31, 2023) was a German-American medical geneticist and professor at the University of Utah School of Medicine. He is best known for rediscovering the concept of the developmental field in humans (first enunciated by Hans Spemann in amphibians) and for his detection and delineation of many genetic syndromes, several now known as the "Opitz syndromes" including Smith–Lemli–Opitz syndrome (SLOS), Opitz–Kaveggia syndrome (FGS1), Opitz G/BBB syndrome, Bohring–Opitz syndrome, and other autosomal and X-linked conditions. He was the founder of the Wisconsin Clinical Genetics Center, the American Journal of Medical Genetics, and was a cofounder of the American College of Medical Genetics and American Board of Medical Genetics.

== Early life ==
John M. Opitz was born to a middle-class family in Hamburg, Germany on August 15, 1935. His father died of tuberculosis while Opitz was still young, a disease that he also contracted and caused him to spend 14 months in a sanatorium. After seven years of separation, he rejoined his mother in 1947 in Nuremberg where she worked as an interpreter for the US occupation forces during the war-crimes trials. They immigrated to the United States in 1950, eventually settling in Iowa City where Opitz' uncle, Hans Koelbel, was Professor of Cello and Chamber Music at the University of Iowa.

== Education ==
It was at the age of 15 that his uncle introduced him to Emil Witschi, an internationally acclaimed embryologist, endocrinologist, and zoologist at the University of Iowa, who fanned Opitz' interest in embryology, genetics and evolution. After completing high school, Opitz studied Zoology at the University of Iowa under Witschi's tutelage, receiving his bachelor's degree in 1956. With the approach of Witschi's retirement from the University of Iowa just previous to his graduation, Opitz wondered where he would go next as his previous plan had been to complete a PhD under Witschi. His mother told him to attend medical school, which he reluctantly agreed to. He attended the University of Iowa. His initial lack of interest dissipated as he was immersed in the world of clinical medicine.

He continued his work with Witschi while in medical school, completing a joint review on the biology of sex determination and sexual differentiation in animals (Witschi, Opitz, 1961). While attending medical school, Opitz was engaged in a variety of other research projects including: glucose metabolism (with N. Halmi), prostate cancer (R. Flocks), and hereditary hematuria (W.W. McCrory). Others who influenced Opitz while in medical school include Hans Zellweger and Jacqueline A. Noonan. He completed his medical degree in 1959 at the University of Iowa, also a rotating internship and his first year of pediatric residency.

== Career ==
=== University of Wisconsin ===
After completion of residency, Opitz searched for fellowship opportunities. He had followed closely the work of Patau, Inhorn and Smith in Madison on human aneuploidy and so, on July 1, 1961, after application and acceptance, Opitz began at the University of Wisconsin, where he completed residency. He spent the last 6 months as pediatric chief resident. He completed his fellowship (1962-1964) in Medical Genetics under the cytogeneticist Klaus Patau and the pediatrician-dysmorphologist David Weyhe Smith. Smith introduced him to the University of Wisconsin Children's Hospital where he began his work on the physical and biological manifestations of syndromes. He also gained experience in the evaluation of normal developmental variability by examining the newborn infants at St. Mary's Hospital in Madison for Smith's study of minor anomalies. It was during the 1960s that Opitz set the groundwork on the scientific advances for which he would be best known- the discovery and definition of multiple congenital anomaly syndromes through the recognition of links between pediatric anomalies and heredity.

After completion of his fellowship, Opitz was appointed Assistant Professor of Medical Genetics and Pediatrics at the University of Wisconsin. He spent 18 years at UW-Madison where he was able to establish the Wisconsin Clinical Genetics Center in 1974, as well as a fetal/pediatric pathology and developmental pathology program in association with Dr. Enid Gilbert-Barness.

=== Shodair- Montana State University ===
In 1979, at the invitation of Philip D. Pallister, Opitz left the University of Wisconsin to become the director of the Shodair-Montana Regional Genetic Service Program in Helena, Montana. This program included such services as cytogenetics and fetal genetic pathology. Later he served as chair of the Department of Medical Genetics at Shodair Children's Hospital and as an adjunct professor in Biology, History and Philosophy, Medicine, and Veterinary Science at Montana State University. In 1994, he was appointed Professor of Medical Humanities.

In Montana, Opitz continued research in genetic syndromes, often collaborating with Phil D. Pallister, leading to the discovery of several syndromes including the Pallister-Hall, KBG, and Pallister-Killian syndromes. This collaboration also led to the discovery of the first human X-autosome translocation which, according to McKusick, was a jumping off point for the era of chromosome mapping.

Prior to leaving Montana, Opitz traveled to Germany to become the first visiting professor of the Hanseatic University Foundation of the University of Lübeck, Department of Genetics.

=== University of Utah ===
In 1997, Opitz joined the faculty at the University of Utah School of Medicine as a Professor of Pediatrics in the division of Medical Genetics and also as a member of the clinical staff at the Children's Medical Center. He held adjunct appointments in the Departments of Human Genetics, Pathology, and Obstetrics and Gynecology. He was an active participant in the fetal genetic pathology program in the Division of Pediatric Pathology at Primary Children's Medical Center until 2015.

== Research ==
Opitz' research and interests, in addition to clinical genetics, covered a wide spectrum of genetic anomalies with focuses on sex determination and sex differentiation, skeletal dysplasias, intellectual disability, human malformations and syndromes and the relationship between evolution and development.

=== "Opitz Syndromes" ===
Opitz' work on identifying the physical and biological symptoms of genetic disorders led to the discovery of the "Opitz syndromes" and created an impetus for important basic science advances. These include documentation of the role of cholesterol in vertebrate development after description of the Smith-Lemli-Opitz syndrome or of the role of the MID1 gene in early ontogeny following discovery of the Opitz GBBB syndrome(s).

An abbreviated list of the syndromes to which Dr. Opitz has contributed or for which he was the first descriptor include:

- Bohring–Opitz syndrome
- C syndrome
- Cornelia de Lange syndrome
- KBG syndrome Brancati, F; Sarkozy, A; Dallapiccola, B (2006). "KBG syndrome". Orphanet J Rare Dis. 1 50. doi:10.1186/1750-1172-1-50. PMC 1764006. PMID 17163996.
- N syndrome
- Noonan syndrome
- Opitz G/BBB syndrome
- Opitz–Kaveggia syndrome (FGS1)
- Smith–Lemli–Opitz syndrome (SLOS)
- Zellweger syndrome

=== Spemann's developmental field ===
In biology, Opitz' most important contribution was the reintroduction of the developmental field concept linking human evolution, genetics, and development. The discovery by Hans Spemann in 1922 of the "organizer" identified the "primary" field. Clinically, radius dysgenesis was defined as a developmental field defect on the basis of causal heterogeneity. Developmental fields are now known as the basic morphogenetic units of the vertebrate embryo. From a phylogenetic perspective, field theory was expanded in recent years to "modularity".

== Editorial and published works ==
In 1976, Opitz founded and became Editor-in-Chief of the American Journal of Medical Genetics. Opitz retired as editor-in-chief of the AJMG in 2001 and was succeeded by John C. Carey.

Opitz wrote over 500 papers and textbook chapters and edited 12 books.

== Honors, awards and distinctions ==
Honorary membership:

- German Pediatric Society- DGKJ(1989)
- Israeli Society of Medical Genetics
- Japan Society of Human Genetics
- Russian Society of Medical Genetics
- Italian Society of Medical Genetics
- South African Society of Human Genetics
- Portuguese Society of Human Genetics (2010)
- Society of Pediatric Pathology (USA)

Honorary degrees (h.c.):

- 1982 – DSci, Montana State University, Bozeman
- 1986 – MD, University of Kiel, Germany
- 1999 – MD, University of Bologna, Italy
- 2004 – MD, University of Copenhagen, Denmark
- 2007 – DSci, Ohio State University, Columbus

Awards and Recognition:

- 2016 – Order of Merit of the Federal Republic of Germany known as the Bundesverdienstkreuz (BVK)
- 2011 – William Allan Award, ASHG
- 2005 – Medal of Honor of the DGfH (German Society of Human Genetics)
- 2002 – Establishment of the John M. Opitz Young Investigator Award, John Wiley and Sons-Publisher
- 2000 – Distinguished Alumni Award for Achievement, University of Iowa
- 2000 – Distinguished Achievement Award for Scientific Literature, IASSIDD
- 1996 – Humboldt Prize, Humboldt Foundation of Germany
- 1996 – Premio Phoenix Anni Verdi for Genetic Research, Italian Medical Genetics Society
- 1996 – Purkynĕ Medal, Czech Society of Medicine
- 1996 – Mendel Medal, Czech Society of Medical Genetics
- 1995 – Fellow of the American Association for the Advancement of Science
- 1994 – Great Seal, University of Palermo
- 1993 – Founding Fellow, American College of Medical Genetics
- 1991 – March of Dimes Colonel Harland Sanders Lifetime Achievement Award for Work in the Field of Genetic Science
- 1989 – University of Wisconsin Alumni Citation
- 1987 – Sidney Farber Lecturer, Society of Pediatric Pathology
- 1988 – Pool of Bethesda Award for Research in Mental Retardation, Bethesda Lutheran Home, Wisconsin
- 1979 – Corresponding member, DGK- German Society of Pediatrics
- 1969-1974 – Research Career Development Award (US PHS/NIH)
- 1967 – Fellow American Academy of Pediatrics
- ___ – Member, Brazilian Academy of Sciences
- 1985 – Member, German Academy of Sciences Leopoldina
- 1982 – Certified Diplomate American Board of Medical Genetics
- 1979-1981 – American Society of Human Genetics Board of Directors
