= Romaciclib =

Investigational drug

Clinical data
- Other names: RVU-120; SEL-120; SEL120-34; SEL120-34A

Identifiers
- IUPAC name: 6,7-dibromo-5-methyl-2-piperazin-1-yl-1,3-diazatricyclo[6.3.1.0^{4,12}]dodeca-2,4,6,8(12)-tetraene
- CAS Number: 1609522-33-9
- PubChem CID: 73776233
- IUPHAR/BPS: 13753
- DrugBank: DB18107
- ChemSpider: 67886362
- UNII: 6LGR0RYY5Q
- ChEMBL: ChEMBL4225966

Chemical and physical data
- Formula: C_{15}H_{18}Br_{2}N_{4}
- Molar mass: 414.145 g·mol^{−1}
- 3D model (JSmol): Interactive image
- SMILES: CC1=C2C3=C(CCCN3C(=N2)N4CCNCC4)C(=C1Br)Br
- InChI: InChI=InChI=1S/C15H18Br2N4/c1-9-11(16)12(17)10-3-2-6-21-14(10)13(9)19-15(21)20-7-4-18-5-8-20/h18H,2-8H2,1H3; Key:FSBMCTDYWXIBLM-UHFFFAOYSA-N

Romaciclib is an investigational new drug being evaluated by Ryvu Therapeutics for the treatment of acute myeloid leukaemia (AML). It is a dual inhibitor of CDK8 and CDK19.
