= Eeva Therman =

Finnish geneticist (1916–2004)

Eeva Therman-Patau
- Portrait of Eeva Therman as a young woman from her obituary in Helsingin Sanomat, written by her friend and colleague Petter Portin.
- Born: Eeva Maria Therman; August 4, 1916; Helsinki, Finland
- Died: June 12, 2004 (aged 87); Helsinki, Finland
- Resting place: Kulosaari Cemetery
- Education: University of Helsinki
- Known for: Genetics of trisomy 13 and trisomy 18
- Spouse(s): Heikki Suomalainen (1943–49); Klaus Patau (1961–75)
- Children: two
- Scientific career
- Fields: Biology
- Workplaces: University of Wisconsin–Madison

Eeva Maria Therman-Patau (1916–2004) was a Finnish-born American geneticist. She worked to characterize the effects and cytogenetics of trisomy 13 and trisomy 18, two rare and usually fatal genetic disorders caused by an extra copy of chromosome 13 and 18, respectively. Her works include Human Chromosomes: Structure, Behavior, Effects, a textbook on cytogenetics which is in its 4th edition. Her research specialties included X-inactivation in mammals and chromosomal abnormalities in cancer.

She received her PhD from the University of Helsinki in 1947. She emigrated to the United States in 1958, and shortly thereafter began to work as a research assistant in Klaus Patau's laboratory in the Department of Genetics at the University of Wisconsin–Madison. Three years later, she married Patau. Due to university hiring rules, she was unable to become faculty until Patau's death in 1975. She retired in 1986, and returned to Finland in 2002.
