= Patau syndrome =

Chromosomal disorder in which there are three copies of chromosome 13

- Other names: Trisomy 13, trisomy D, T13
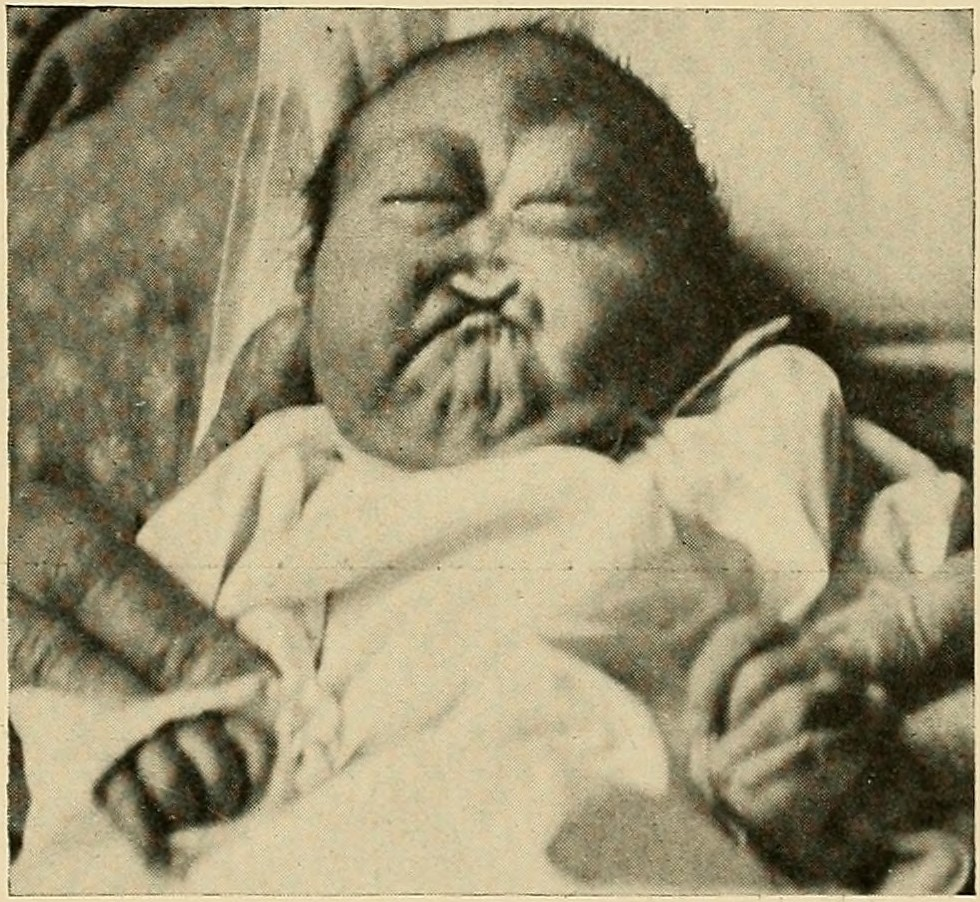
- Infant with Patau syndrome showing cleft lip, reduction of nose, and hypotelorism (c. 1912)
- Pronunciation: /ˈpætaʊ/
- Specialty: Medical genetics
- Symptoms: Intellectual disability, motor disorder, microcephaly, polydactyly, heart defects, deformed feet
- Usual onset: Present at birth
- Duration: Lifelong
- Types: Full, mosaic
- Causes: Third copy of chromosome 13
- Risk factors: Higher maternal age
- Diagnostic method: Karyotype
- Treatment: Supportive care
- Prognosis: 90% of babies born alive die within their first year of life
- Frequency: 1 in 21,700 to 1 in 10,000 live births
- Named after: Klaus Patau

Patau syndrome, also called trisomy 13, is a syndrome caused by a chromosomal abnormality, in which some or all of the cells of the body contain extra genetic material from chromosome 13. The extra genetic material disrupts normal development, causing multiple and complex organ defects.

This can occur either because each cell contains a full extra copy of chromosome 13 (a disorder known as trisomy 13 or trisomy D or T13), or because each cell contains an extra partial copy of the chromosome, or because there are two different lines of cells—one healthy with the correct number of chromosomes 13 and one that contains an extra copy of the chromosome—mosaic Patau syndrome. Full trisomy 13 is caused by nondisjunction of chromosomes during meiosis; the mosaic form is caused by nondisjunction during mitosis.

Like all nondisjunction conditions (such as Down syndrome and Edwards syndrome), the risk of this syndrome in the offspring increases with maternal age at pregnancy. Patau syndrome affects somewhere between 1 in 10,000 and 1 in 21,700 live births.

== Signs and symptoms ==
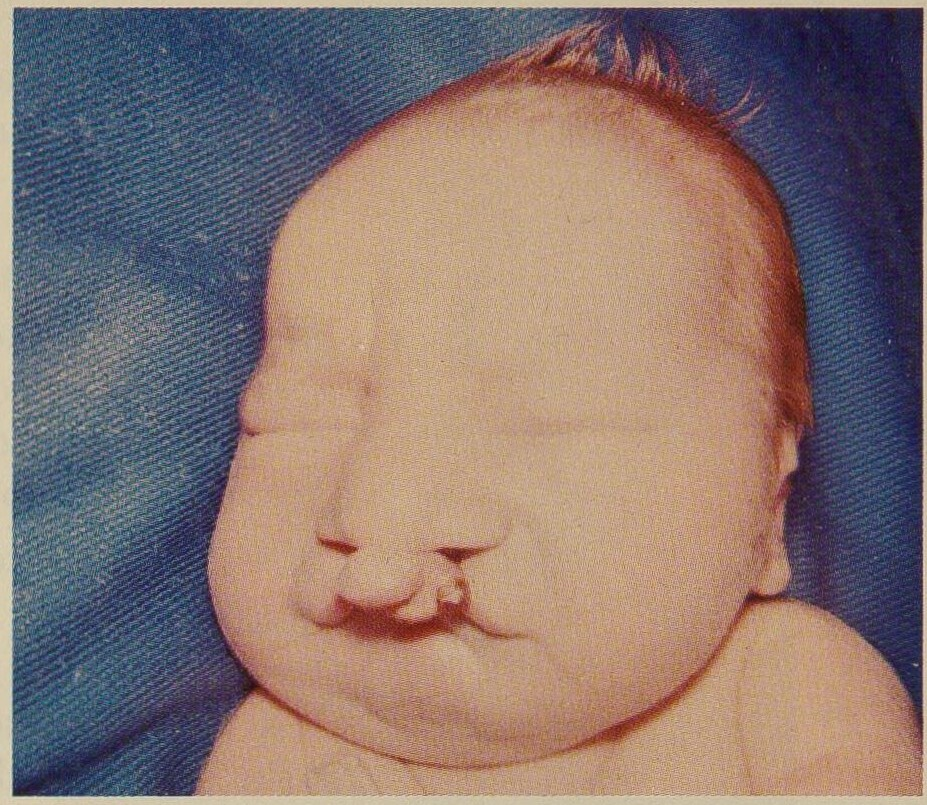
Infant with Patau Syndrome

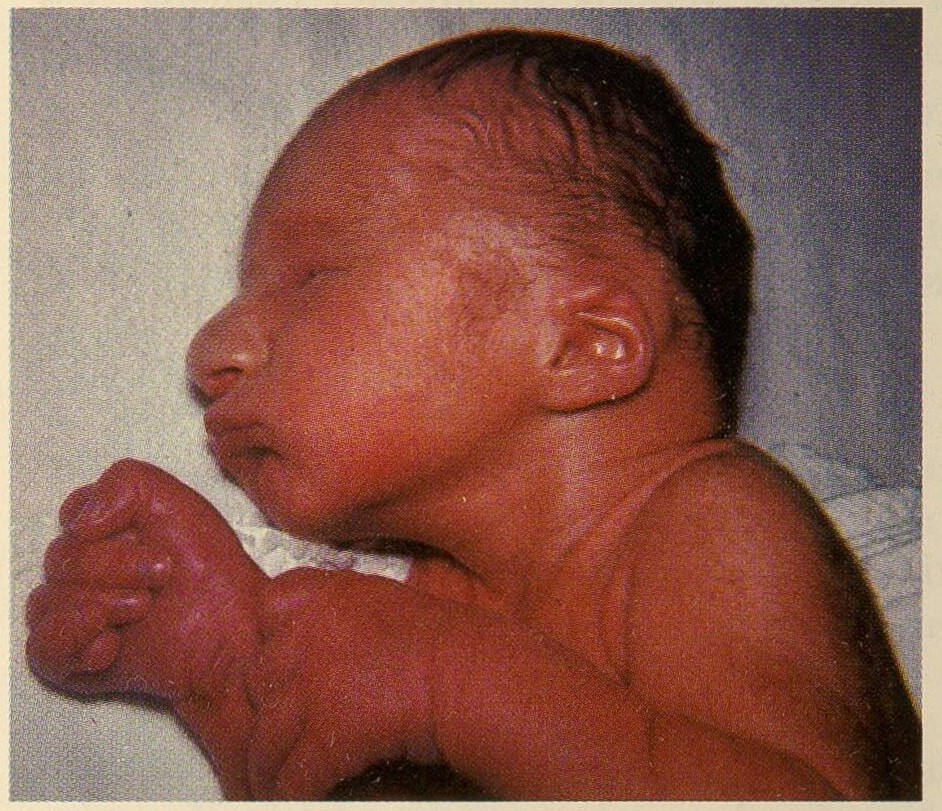
Mild example of facies in Patau syndrome

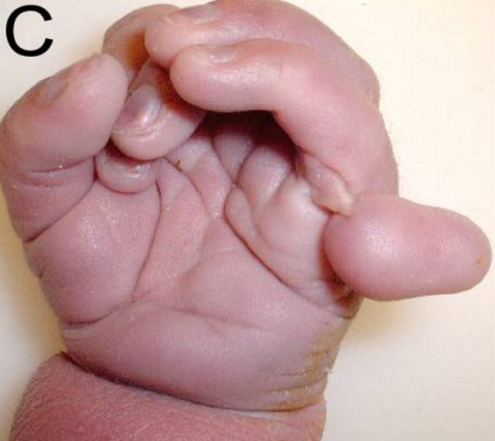
Six fingers in a baby with Patau syndrome

Of those fetuses that do survive to gestation and birth, common abnormalities may include:

- Nervous system
  - Intellectual disability and motor disorder
  - Microcephaly
  - Holoprosencephaly (failure of the forebrain to divide properly) and associated facial deformities such as cyclopia
  - Structural eye defects, including microphthalmia, Peters' anomaly, cataract, coloboma of iris or fundus, retinal dysplasia or retinal detachment, sensory nystagmus, cortical visual loss, and optic nerve hypoplasia
  - Meningomyelocele (a spinal defect)
- Musculoskeletal and cutaneous
  - Polydactyly (extra digits)
  - Proboscis
  - Congenital trigger digits
  - Low-set ears
  - Prominent heel
  - Deformed feet known as rocker-bottom feet
  - Omphalocele (abdominal defect)
  - Abnormal palm pattern
  - Overlapping of fingers over thumb
  - Cutis aplasia (missing portion of the skin/hair)
  - Cleft palate
- Urogenital
  - Abnormal genitalia
  - Kidney defects
- Other
  - Heart defects (ventricular septal defect) (Patent Ductus Arteriosus)
  - Dextrocardia
  - Single umbilical artery

== Causes ==
Trisomy 13 is the cause of Patau syndrome, which means each cell in the body has three copies of chromosome 13 instead of the usual two. A small percentage of cases occur when only some of the body's cells have an extra copy; such cases are called mosaic trisomy 13.

Patau syndrome can also occur when part of chromosome 13 becomes attached to another chromosome (translocated) before or at conception in a Robertsonian translocation. Affected people have two copies of chromosome 13, plus extra material from chromosome 13 attached to another chromosome. With a translocation, the person has a partial trisomy for chromosome 13, and often the physical signs of the syndrome differ from the typical Patau syndrome.

Most cases of Patau syndrome are not inherited but occur as random events during the formation of reproductive cells (eggs and sperm). An error in cell division called non-disjunction can result in reproductive cells with an abnormal number of chromosomes. For example, an egg or sperm cell may gain an extra copy of the chromosome. If one of these atypical reproductive cells contributes to the genetic makeup of a child, the child will have an extra chromosome 13 in each of the body's cells. Mosaic Patau syndrome is also not inherited. It occurs as a random error during cell division early in fetal development.

Patau syndrome due to a translocation can be inherited. An unaffected person can carry a rearrangement of genetic material between chromosome 13 and another chromosome. This rearrangement is called a balanced translocation because there is no extra material from chromosome 13. Although they do not have signs of Patau syndrome, people who carry this type of balanced translocation are at an increased risk of having children with the condition.

=== Recurrence risk ===
Unless one of the parents is a carrier of a translocation, the chances of a couple having another trisomy 13 affected child is less than 1%, below that of Down syndrome.

== Diagnosis ==
Diagnosis is usually based on clinical findings, although fetal chromosome testing will show trisomy 13. While many of the physical findings are similar to Edwards syndrome, there are a few unique traits, such as polydactyly. However, unlike Edwards syndrome and Down syndrome, the quad screen does not provide a reliable means of screening for this disorder. This is due to the variability of the results seen in fetuses with Patau.

== Treatment ==
Medical management of children with Trisomy 13 is planned on a case-by-case basis and depends on the individual circumstances of the patient. Treatment of Patau syndrome focuses on the particular physical problems with which each child is born. Many infants have difficulty surviving the first few days or weeks due to severe neurological problems or complex heart defects. Surgery may be necessary to repair heart defects or cleft lip and cleft palate. Physical, occupational, and speech therapy will help individuals with Patau syndrome reach their full developmental potential. Surviving children are described as happy and parents report that they enrich their lives.

== Prognosis ==
Approximately 90% of infants with Patau syndrome die within the first year of life. Those children who do survive past 1 year of life are typically severely disabled with intellectual disability, seizures, and psychomotor issues. Children with the mosaic variation are usually affected to a lesser extent. In a retrospective Canadian study of 174 children with trisomy 13, median survival time was 12.5 days. One and ten-year survival were 19.8% and 12.9%, respectively, including those who underwent aggressive surgical intervention.

== History ==
Trisomy 13 was first described by Thomas Bartholin in 1657, but the chromosomal nature of the disease was ascertained by Dr. Klaus Patau and Dr. Eeva Therman in 1960. The disease is named after Patau.

In England and Wales during 2008–09, there were 172 diagnoses of Patau syndrome (trisomy 13), with 91% of diagnoses made prenatally. There were 111 elective abortions, 14 stillbirth/miscarriage/fetal deaths, 30 outcomes unknown, and 17 live births. Approximately 4% of Patau syndrome with unknown outcomes are likely to result in a live birth, therefore the total number of live births is estimated to be 18.
