= MED26 =

Protein-coding gene in the species Homo sapiens

Identifiers
- Aliases: MED26, CRSP7, CRSP70, mediator complex subunit 26
- External IDs: OMIM: 605043; MGI: 1917875; GeneCards: MED26

Gene location (Human)
Chr.	Chromosome 19 (human)
Band	19p13.11	Start	16,574,907 bp
Band	19p13.11	End	16,629,062 bp

Gene location (Mouse)
Chr.	Chromosome 8 (mouse)
Band	8|8 B3.3	Start	73,248,405 bp
Band	8|8 B3.3	End	73,302,114 bp
RNA expression pattern
Bgee	Human / Mouse (ortholog); Top expressed in: sperm; amniotic fluid; buccal mucosa cell; tibialis anterior muscle; nipple; skin of arm; mucosa of ileum; left testis; right testis; secondary oocyte / Top expressed in: seminiferous tubule; secondary oocyte; primary oocyte; spermatocyte; zygote; spermatid; granulocyte; muscle of thigh; medullary collecting duct; renal corpuscle; More reference expression data
BioGPS	n/a
Gene ontology
Molecular function	transcription coactivator activity; transcription coregulator activity; protein binding
Cellular component	mediator complex; nucleus; nucleoplasm; core mediator complex
Biological process	regulation of transcription by RNA polymerase II; transcription initiation from RNA polymerase II promoter; regulation of transcription, DNA-templated; transcription, DNA-templated; positive regulation of nucleic acid-templated transcription; positive regulation of gene expression
Sources:Amigo / QuickGO
Orthologs
Databases	NCBI: entry; OMA: entry
Species	Human	Mouse
Entrez	9441	70625
Ensembl	ENSG00000105085	ENSMUSG00000045248
UniProt	O95402	Q7TN02
RefSeq (mRNA)	NM_004831	NM_027485
RefSeq (protein)	NP_004822	NP_081761
Location (UCSC)	Chr 19: 16.57 – 16.63 Mb	Chr 8: 73.25 – 73.3 Mb
PubMed search
- Wikidata
View/Edit Human	View/Edit Mouse

Med26
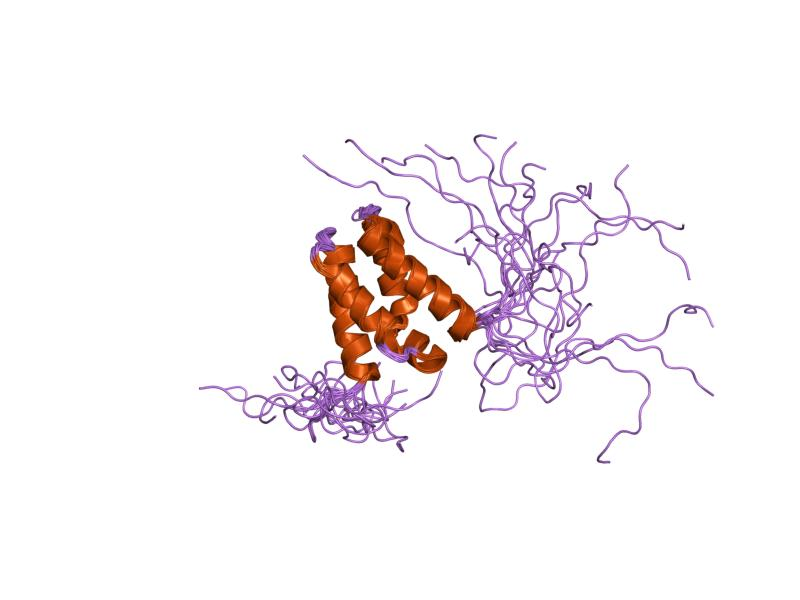
- solution structure of the n-terminal domain i of mouse transcription elongation factor s-ii protein 3

Identifiers
- Symbol: Med26 N-terminal domain
- Pfam: PF08711
- InterPro: IPR017923
Available protein structures:
- PDB: IPR017923 PF08711 (ECOD; PDBsum)
- AlphaFold: IPR017923; PF08711

Mediator subunit 26 Middle domain

Identifiers
- Symbol: Med26_M
- Pfam: PF15694
Available protein structures:
- PDB: PF15694 (ECOD; PDBsum)
- AlphaFold: PF15694

Mediator subunit 26 C-terminal domain

Identifiers
- Symbol: Med26_C
- Pfam: PF15693
Available protein structures:
- PDB: PF15693 (ECOD; PDBsum)
- AlphaFold: PF15693

Mediator of RNA polymerase II transcription subunit 26 is an enzyme that in humans is encoded by the MED26 gene. It forms part of the Mediator complex.

The activation of gene transcription is a multistep process that is triggered by factors that recognize transcriptional enhancer sites in DNA. These factors work with co-activators to direct transcriptional initiation by the RNA polymerase II apparatus. The protein encoded by this gene is a subunit of the CRSP (cofactor required for SP1 activation) complex, which, along with TFIID, is required for efficient activation by SP1. This protein is also a component of other multisubunit complexes e.g. thyroid hormone receptor-(TR-) associated proteins which interact with TR and facilitate TR function on DNA templates in conjunction with initiation factors and cofactors.

== Activity ==
MED26 is a transcription elongation factor that increases the overall transcription rate of RNA polymerase II by reactivating transcription elongation complexes that have arrested transcription. It does this through recruiting ELL/EAF- and P-TEFb- containing complexes to promoters via a direct interaction with the N-terminal domain (NTD). The MED26 NTD also binds TFIID, and TFIID and elongation complexes interact with MED26 through overlapping binding sites. MED26 NTD may function as a molecular switch contributing to the transition of Pol II into productive elongation.

The three structural domains of TFIIS are conserved from yeast to human. The 80 or so N-terminal residues form a protein interaction domain containing a conserved motif, which has been called the LW motif because of the invariant leucine and tryptophan residues it contains. Although the N-terminal domain is not needed for transcriptional activity, a similar sequence has been identified in other transcription factors and proteins that are predominantly nuclear localized. Specific examples are listed below:

- MED26 (also known as CRSP70 and ARC70), a subunit of the Mediator complex, which is required for the activity of the enhancer-binding protein Sp1.
- Elongin A, a subunit of a transcription elongation factor previously known as SIII. It increases the rate of transcription by suppressing transient pausing of the elongation complex.
- PPP1R10, a nuclear regulatory subunit of protein phosphatase 1 that was previously known as p99, FB19 or PNUTS.
- PIBP, a small hypothetical protein that could be a phosphoinositide binding protein.
- IWS1, which is thought to function in both transcription initiation and elongation.
- TFIIS, which rescues RNA polymerase II from backtracked pause states.

The N-terminal domain of MED26 is a protein fold known as a TFIIS N-terminal domain (or TND). It is a compact five-helix bundle. The hydrophobic core residues of helices 2, 3, and 4 are well conserved among TFIIS domains, although helix 1 is less conserved.

== Interactions ==
MED26 has been shown to interact with MED8, Cyclin-dependent kinase 8, POLR2A, MED12 and MED28. It also acts synergistically to mediate the interaction between REST (a Kruppel-type zinc finger transcription factor that binds to a 21-bp RE1 silencing element present in over 900 human genes) and Mediator.
