= Opitz G/BBB syndrome =

- Other names: Hypertelorism-oesophageal abnormality-hypospadias syndrome

Opitz G/BBB syndrome, also known as Opitz syndrome, G syndrome or BBB syndrome, is a rare genetic disorder that will affect physical structures along the midline of the body. The letters G and BBB represent the last names of the families that were first diagnosed with the disorder, while Opitz is the last name of the doctor that first described the signs and symptoms of the disease. There are two different forms of Optiz G/BBB syndrome: x-linked (recessive) syndrome (Type I; XLOS; OSX) and dominant autosomal syndrome (Type II; ADOS). However, both result in common physical deformities, although their pattern of inheritance may differ. Several other names for the disease(s) are no longer used. These include hypospadias-dysphagia syndrome, Opitz-Frias syndrome, telecanthus with associated abnormalities, and hypertelorism-hypospadias syndrome.

One out of every 50,000 to 100,000 males is born with X-linked type II Optiz G/BBB syndrome, but professionals believe that condition is under diagnosed and there are actually many more cases. It is unknown as to how many autosomal dominant cases exist. However, the autosomal dominant cases are also categorized under a more commonly diagnosed group called 22q11.2 deletion syndrome. This group includes several other diseases that all result because of a small deletion of chromosome 22 at the q11.2 location.

== Signs and symptoms ==
The three most common symptoms of Opitz G/BBB syndrome (both type I & II) are hypertelorism (exceptionally wide-spaced eyes), laryngo-tracheo-esophalgeal defects (including clefts and holes in the palate, larynx, trachea and esophagus) and hypospadias (urinary openings in males not at the tip of the penis) (Meroni, Opitz G/BBB syndrome, 2012). Abnormalities in the larynx, trachea and esophagus can cause significant difficulty breathing and/or swallowing and can result in reoccurring pneumonia and life-threatening situations. Commonly, there may be a gap between the trachea and esophagus, referred to as a laryngeal cleft; which can allow food or fluid to enter the airway and make breathing and eating a difficult task.

Genital abnormalities like a urinary opening under the penis (hypospadias), undescended testes (cryptorchidism), underdeveloped scrotum and a scrotum divided into two lobes (bifid scrotum) can all be commonplace for males with the disease.

Developmental delays of the brain and nervous system are also common in both types I and II of the disease. 50% of people with Opitz G/BBB Syndrome will experience developmental delay and mild intellectual disability. This can impact motor skills, speech and learning capabilities. Some of these instances are likened to autistic spectrum disorders. Close to half of the people with Opitz G/BBB Syndrome also have a cleft lip (hole in the lip opening) and possibly a cleft palate (hole in the roof of the mouth), as well. Less than half of the people diagnosed have heart defects, imperforate anus (obstructed anal opening), and brain defects. Of all the impairments, female carriers of X-linked Type I Opitz G/BBB Syndrome usually only have ocular hypertelorism.

== Cause ==
Opitz G/BBB Syndrome is a rare genetic condition caused by one of two major types of mutations: MID1 mutation on the short (p) arm of the X chromosome or a mutation of the 22q11.2 gene on the 22nd chromosome.

== Mechanism ==
Both X-linked Type I and Autosomal dominant Type II Optiz G/BBB syndromes are caused by genetic mutations. However, while the X-linked form is caused by a mutation on the midline 1 (MID1) gene on the short (p) arm of the X chromosome; the autosomal dominant form is due to a mutation on chromosome 22. Both forms of the disease result in physical deformities along the centerline of the body.

In X-linked Type I patients, the mutation in the MID1 gene leads to less functional midline-1 proteins. These proteins are responsible for binding to the cytoskeleton and assist the cell during cell division. It seems these issues with early cell division have a significant impact on the physical deformities that typically accompany the disease.

Autosomal dominant Type II patients endure a mutation on chromosome 22, most commonly at 22q11.2. Some researchers consider Opitz G/BBB syndrome to be a type of 22q11.2 deletion syndrome (a slightly different and broader disease). In some cases of autosomal dominant Opitz G/BBB syndrome, the disease is caused by a mutation in the SPECC1L gene (near the 22q11.2 gene), which helps make cytospin-A. Cytospin-A is a protein imperative to the formation of facial features and is often considered responsible for the cleft lip or palate that Opitz G/BBB syndrome patients will have.

Since physical abnormalities can affect all body parts along the midline of the body, many different body systems are at risk of being damaged. Those systems commonly affected are the nervous, digestive, cardiovascular, respiratory and reproductive. Typically, those diagnosed with either type of Opitz G/BBB syndrome will also have ocular hypertelorism, or eyes that are excessively spaced apart. Patients will commonly experience physical defects in the larynx, trachea and esophagus and will often cause breathing and swallowing difficulties. Further facial anomalies may occur, such as a prominent forehead, widow's peak, broad nasal bridge. Those with the disease may also experience hypospadias (urinary opening in males is not at the head of the penis) and developmental delay, as well.

== Diagnosis ==
X-linked type I Opitz G/BBB Syndrome is diagnosed on clinical findings, but those findings can vary greatly: even within the same family. Manifestations of X-linked type I are classified in the frequent/major findings and minor findings that are found in less than 50% of individuals.

The three major findings that suggest a person has X-linked Type I Opitz G/BBB Syndrome:

1. Ocular hypertelorism (~100% cases)
2. Hypospadias (85-90% cases)
3. Laryngotracheoesophageal abnormalities (60-70%)

Minor findings found in less than 50% of individuals:

1. Intellectual disability
2. Cleft lip/palate
3. Congenital heart defects
4. Imperforate (blocked) anus
5. Brain defects (especially corpus callosum)

In 1989, Hogdall used ultrasonographs to diagnose X-linked Type I Opitz G/BBB Syndrome after 19 weeks of pregnancy, by identifying hypertelorism (widely-spaced eyes) and hypospadias (irregular urinary tract openings in the penis).

There is also molecular genetic testing available to identify mutations leading to Opitz G/BBB Syndrome. X-linked Type I testing must be done on MID1, since this is the only gene that is known to cause Type I Opitz G/BBB Syndrome. Two different tests can be performed: sequence analysis and deletion/duplication analysis. In the sequence analysis a positive result would detect 15-50% of the DNA sequence mutated, while a deletion/duplication positive result would find deletion or duplication of one or more exons of the entire MID1 gene.

== Prevention ==
In terms of prevention, several researchers strongly suggest prenatal testing for at-risk pregnancies if a MID1 mutation has been identified in a family member. Doctors can perform a fetal sex test through chromosome analysis and then screen the DNA for any mutations causing the disease. Knowing that a child may be born with Opitz G/BBB syndrome could help physicians prepare for the child's needs and the family prepare emotionally. Furthermore, genetic counseling for young adults that are affected, are carriers or are at risk of carrying is strongly suggested, as well (Meroni, Opitz G/BBB syndrome, 2012). Current research suggests that the cause is genetic and no known environmental risk factors have been documented. The only education for prevention suggested is genetic testing for at-risk young adults when a mutation is found or suspected in a family member.

== Treatment ==
Because the variability of this disease is so great and the way that it reveals itself could be multi-faceted; once diagnosed, a multidisciplinary team is recommended to treat the disease and should include a craniofacial surgeon, ophthalmologist, pediatrician, pediatric urologist, cardiologist, pulmonologist, speech pathologist, and a medical geneticist. Several important steps must be followed, as well.

- Past medical history
- Physical examination with special attention to size and measurements of facial features, palate, heart, genitourinary system and lower respiratory system
- Eye evaluation
- Hypospadias assessment by urologist
- Laryngoscopy and chest x-ray for difficulties with breathing/swallowing
- Cleft lip/palate assessment by craniofacial surgeon
- Assessment of standard age developmental and intellectual abilities
- Anal position assessment
- Echocardiogram
- Cranial imaging

Many surgical repairs may be needed, as assessed by professionals. Furthermore, special education therapies and psychoemotional therapies may be required, as well. In some cases, antireflux drugs can be prescribed until risk of breathing and swallowing disorders are removed. Genetic counseling is highly advised to help explain who else in the family may be at risk for the disease and to help guide family planning decisions in the future.

Because of its wide variability in which defects will occur, there is no known mortality rate specifically for the disease. However, the leading cause of death for people with Opitz G/BBB syndrome is due to infant death caused by aspiration due to esophageal, pharyngeal or laryngeal defects. Fortunately, to date there are no factors that can increase the expression of symptoms of this disease. All abnormalities and symptoms are present at birth.

Since the symptoms caused by this disease are present at birth, there is no “cure.” The best cure that scientists are researching is awareness and genetic testing to determine risk factors and increase knowledgeable family planning. Prevention is the only option at this point in time for a cure.

== See also ==
- DiGeorge syndrome (22q11.2 Deletion Syndrome)
