= Congenital trigger thumb =

- Other names: Pediatric trigger thumb (PTT)
- This condition is inherited in an autosomal dominant manner
- Specialty: Plastic surgery Medical genetics

Congenital trigger thumb is a trigger thumb in infants and young children. Triggering, clicking or snapping is observed by flexion or extension of the interphalangeal joint (IPJ). In the furthest stage, no extension is possible and there is a fixed flexion deformity of the thumb in the IPJ. Cause, natural history, prognosis and recommended treatment are controversial.

== Signs and symptoms ==
Besides the clicking, snapping or triggering, a characteristic Notta nodule is commonly found on the palmar side at the metacarpophalangeal (MCP) joint. This nodule can be found by palpation. Children can also present a thumb which they cannot extend actively due to entrapment of the nodule to the A1 pulley. Some may even present with a fixed flexion deformity of the IPJ where no extension is possible.

== Cause ==
It is unclear whether the cause of the trigger thumb is congenital or acquired. The occurrence of bilateral incidence and trigger thumbs in both children of twins are an indication for a congenital cause. Trigger thumb in children is also associated with trisomy of chromosome 13. For these reasons it was assumed that trigger thumbs in children are to be of congenital cause. However, more and more evidence which point towards an acquired cause have been found in recent studies. Therefore, the name pediatric trigger thumb is also widely used (and currently preferred by some) for the same disorder.

== Diagnosis ==
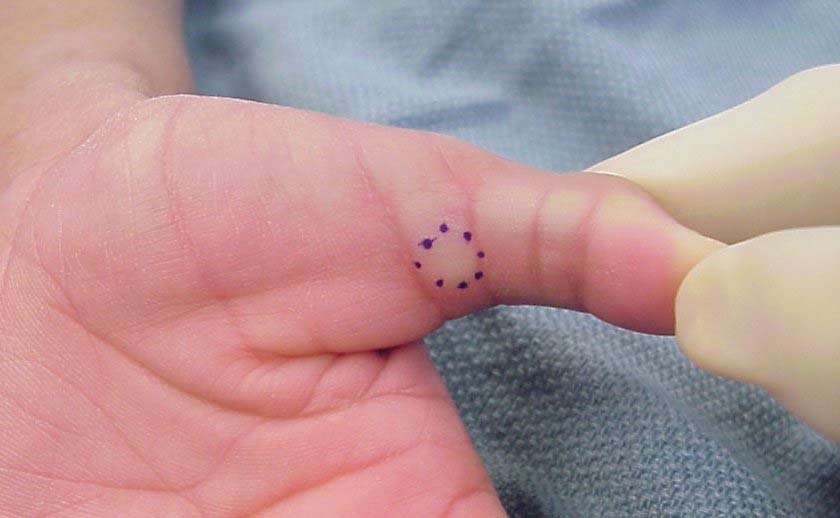
A Notta nodule

Diagnosis of a trigger thumb is solely made by these clinical observations and further classified into four stages:

Stage	Observations
I	A Notta nodule is present, but no triggering is observed in the IPJ.
II	Triggering is observed during active extension of the IPJ.
III	Active extension of the IPJ is not possible and triggering is observed during passive extension of the IPJ.
IV	Passive extension of the IPJ is not possible. (There is a fixed flexion deformity.)

== Treatment ==
There are several types of treatment for congenital trigger thumb, conservative and surgical.

=== Conservative ===
The conservative treatment consists of observation in time. Studies show that the trigger thumb spontaneously resolves in 49 months. According to Leung et al., trigger thumbs in infants resolve spontaneously in 63% of the cases. No residual deformities were found and there is no recurrence once resolved. Residual deformity is defined as persistent flexion deformities of the thumb and radial deviation at the IPJ. Extension exercises and splinting can be added to the observation. These two elements have favourable results in improvement in flexion impairment of the thumb. However, compared to observation, the benefit of merely extension exercises and splinting are still unclear.

It has been recommended to attempt conservative treatment first, before attempting surgical treatment.

=== Surgical ===
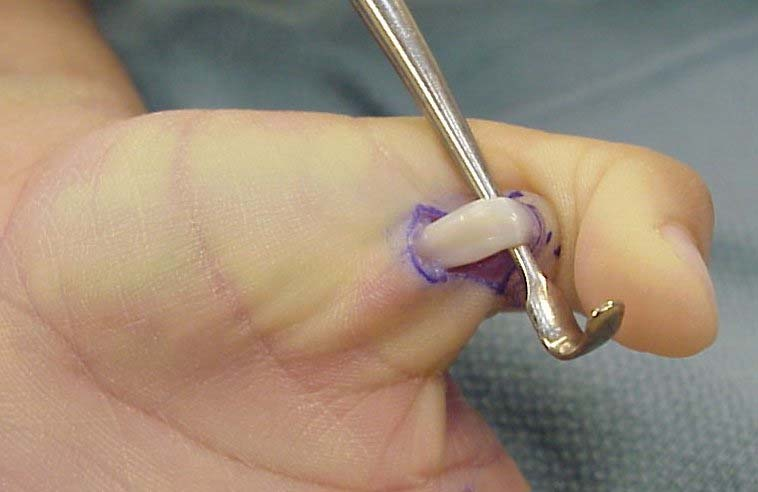
A1 Pulley release through open surgery

Surgical treatment should be considered when the patient has a trigger thumb bilaterally and when the patient has a severe trigger thumb. Severe is defined as when the thumb is locked so that the thumb cannot be flexed or extended either passively or actively. Surgical treatment should also be considered when observation and/or splint therapy has not achieved sufficient results after 49 months. Unlike the surgical treatment given for adults, which is unambiguously a surgical release of the A1 pulley of the thumb, the optimum surgical treatment for infants has not yet been discerned. In case of infants, research has shown that only in 15% of the cases A1 pulley release alone is sufficient. In most of the cases there was an additional annular pulley structure distal to the A1 to be released resolving the triggering: the so-called Av pulley or variable pulley. Therefore, infants and adults need to be treated differently as the main problem is different.

==== Open vs. percutaneous ====
There are two types of surgery: open surgery which is mentioned above and percutaneous surgery. Unlike open surgery percutaneous surgery is done without exposing the anatomical structures beneath the skin. Research has shown that percutaneous surgery is a good alternative to open surgery. Percutaneous surgery is done with a needle that is inserted in the flexor sheath at the level of the A1 pulley. Before the needle insertion the thumb is placed in extension, whereas when the needle is already inserted the thumb will be put into semi-flexion, so that the needle can be moved and the palmar skin is movable. The A1 pulley will then be cut with the needle longitudinally and parallel to the fibers of the tendon of the flexor pollicis longus muscle. When the release with the needle is done according to the pivot maneuver the chances of incomplete release and damage to the digital nerve nearby will be increased. To prevent any postoperative hematoma and swelling, pressure should be applied for at least 10 minutes after the procedure. Percutaneous surgery has also been proven to be without residual deformities and recurrence after surgery. When the A1 pulley is too thick and long to be released at once, open surgery still can be a solution. The advantages over open surgery are that percutaneous surgery is simpler, more straightforward and shorter concerning the duration. It can also be done in every other examination room unlike the open surgery, which is done in an operation room. The risk nonetheless is that the digital nerve of the thumb nearby can be damaged.

== Epidemiology ==
Not much research has been done on the epidemiology of congenital trigger thumbs. There are a few reports on the incidence in their respective studies. The most recent data comes from a Japanese study by Kukichi and Ogino where they found an incidence 3.3 trigger thumbs per 1,000 live births in 1-year-old children.
