= MED8 =

Protein-coding gene in humans

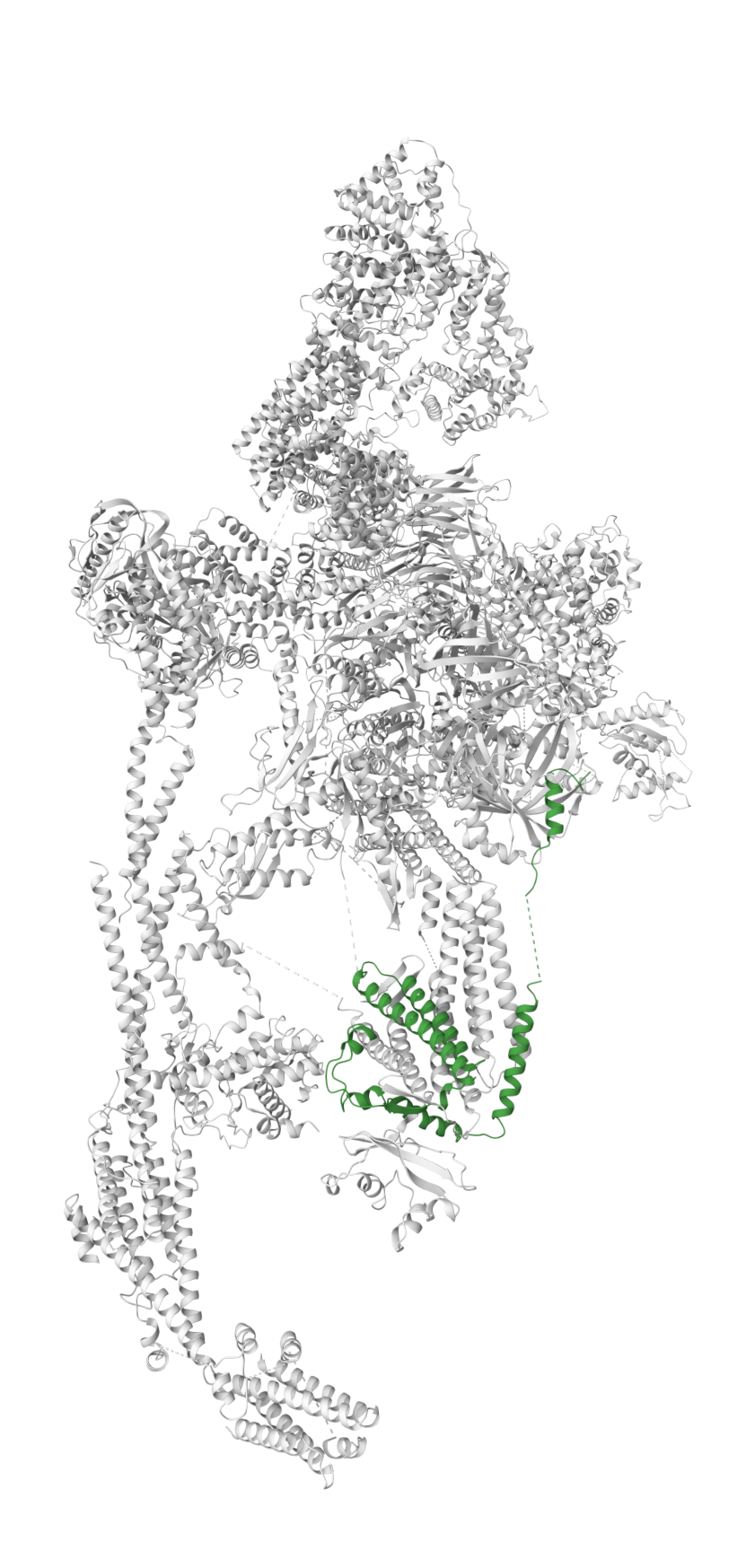

Identifiers
- Aliases: MED8, ARC32, mediator complex subunit 8
- External IDs: OMIM: 607956; MGI: 1915269; GeneCards: MED8

Gene location (Human)
Chr.	Chromosome 1 (human)
Band	1p34.2	Start	43,383,917 bp
Band	1p34.2	End	43,389,808 bp

Gene location (Mouse)
Chr.	Chromosome 4 (mouse)
Band	4 D2.1|4	Start	118,266,534 bp
Band	4 D2.1|4	End	118,272,979 bp
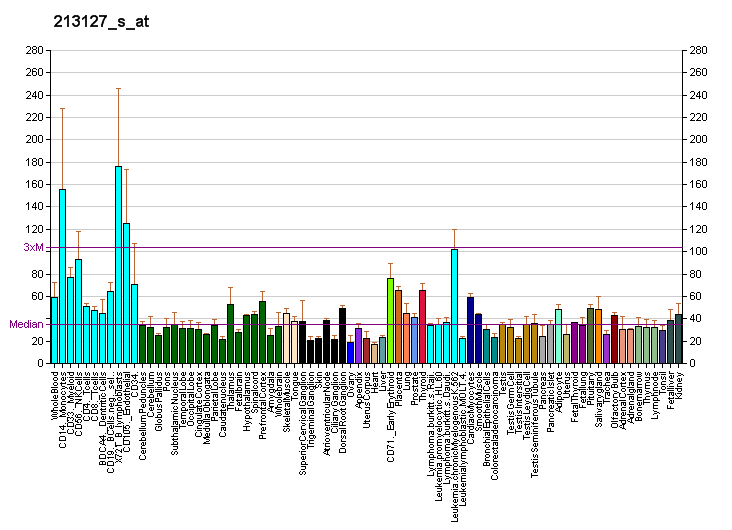

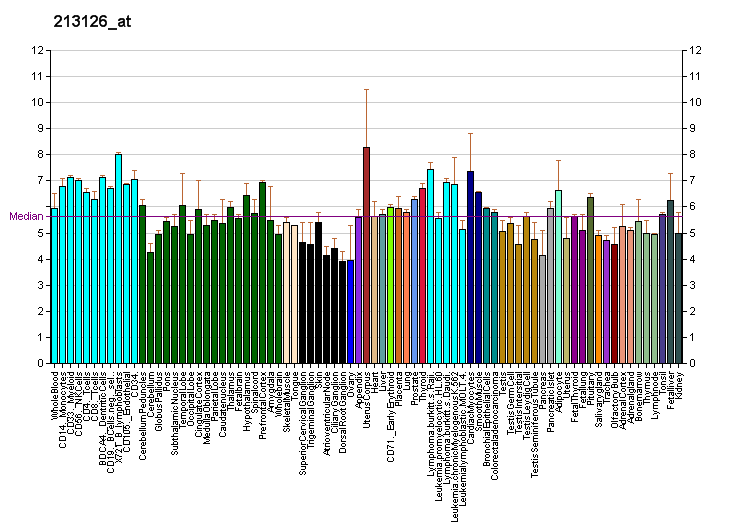

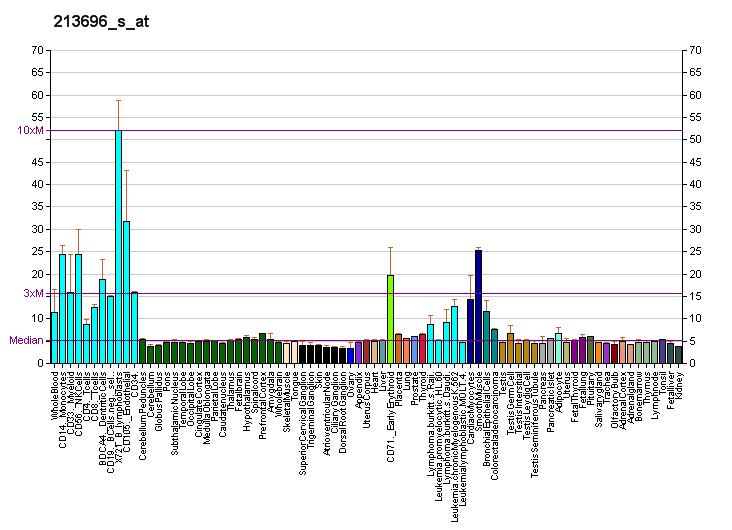
RNA expression pattern
Bgee	Human / Mouse (ortholog); Top expressed in: oocyte; secondary oocyte; stromal cell of endometrium; anterior pituitary; mucosa of esophagus; mucosa of transverse colon; skin of leg; body of pancreas; skin of abdomen; body of stomach / Top expressed in: ectoderm; otic vesicle; otic placode; saccule; yolk sac; abdominal wall; medial ganglionic eminence; fetal liver hematopoietic progenitor cell; endocardial cushion; epiblast; More reference expression data
BioGPS	More reference expression data
Gene ontology
Molecular function	transcription coregulator activity; protein binding; RNA polymerase II cis-regulatory region sequence-specific DNA binding
Cellular component	mediator complex; nucleus; nucleoplasm; core mediator complex
Biological process	regulation of transcription by RNA polymerase II; transcription initiation from RNA polymerase II promoter; regulation of transcription, DNA-templated; protein ubiquitination; transcription, DNA-templated
Sources:Amigo / QuickGO
Orthologs
Databases	NCBI: entry; OMA: entry
Species	Human	Mouse
Entrez	112950	80509
Ensembl	ENSG00000159479	ENSMUSG00000006392
UniProt	Q96G25	Q9D7W5
RefSeq (mRNA)	NM_201542; NM_001001653; NM_052877	NM_001290688; NM_020000; NM_173719
RefSeq (protein)	NP_001001653; NP_443109; NP_963836	NP_001277617; NP_064384; NP_776067
Location (UCSC)	Chr 1: 43.38 – 43.39 Mb	Chr 4: 118.27 – 118.27 Mb
PubMed search
- Wikidata
View/Edit Human	View/Edit Mouse

Mediator of RNA polymerase II transcription subunit 8 is an enzyme that in humans is encoded by the MED8 gene.

== Function ==
This gene encodes a protein that is one of more than 20 subunits of the mediator complex, first identified in S. cerevisiae, that is required for activation of transcription. The product of this gene also interacts with elongins B and C, and CUL2 and RBX1, to reconstitute a ubiquitin ligase. Five alternative transcripts encoding four isoforms have been described.

== Interactions ==
MED8 has been shown to interact with MED26.
