= Lujan–Fryns syndrome =

- Other names: X-linked mental retardation with Marfanoid habitus, Lujan syndrome
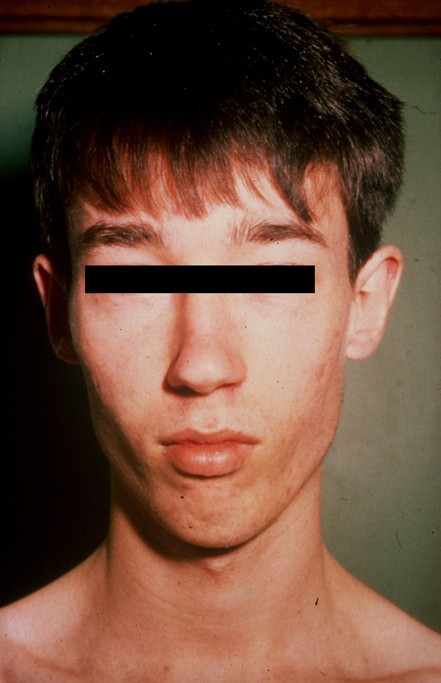
- Lujan–Fryns syndrome in a young adult male, with features that include a long, narrow face and recessed chin.
- Specialty: Medical genetics

Lujan–Fryns syndrome (LFS) is an X-linked genetic disorder that causes mild to moderate intellectual disability and features described as Marfanoid habitus, referring to a group of physical characteristics similar to those found in Marfan syndrome. These features include a tall, thin stature and long, slender limbs. LFS is also associated with psychopathology and behavioral abnormalities, and it exhibits a number of malformations affecting the brain and heart. The disorder is inherited in an X-linked dominant manner, and is attributed to a missense mutation in the MED12 gene. There is currently no treatment or therapy for the underlying MED12 malfunction, and the exact cause of the disorder remains unclear.

== Signs and symptoms ==
Intellectual disability in LFS usually ranges from mild to moderate, but severe cases have also been reported. A relatively common brain anomaly seen with LFS is agenesis of the corpus callosum, an error of embryonic development in which the corpus callosum (a structure of the mammalian brain composed of nerves that allows communication between the left and right cerebral hemispheres) is not present. Among a number of adverse neurological effects sometimes found with an absence of the corpus callosum, intellectual disability has been shown to occur at a rate of approximately 73 percent. A correlation between agenesis of the corpus callosum and intellectual disability in LFS, however, has not been suggested.

=== Psychiatric ===
Psychopathology and related behavioral abnormalities are typically seen in LFS, and they may be considered in the diagnosis of the disorder. The most common of these in LFS is an autism-like spectrum disorder, and LFS is considered one of a number of genetic disorders associated with autism. Additional alterations of psychopathology with behavioral manifestations that have been observed in LFS include: psychotic behavior, schizophrenia, hyperactivity and attention-deficit hyperactivity disorder, aggression, oppositional defiant disorder, obsessive compulsive disorder, extreme shyness, learning disability, cognitive impairment, short-term memory deficit, low frustration tolerance, social dysfunction, lack of impulse control, eating disorder and associated malnutrition, attributed to psychogenic loss of appetite; and pyromania.

While psychiatric conditions like these are to be expected with LFS, there have also been cases of the disorder with some preservation of mental and behavioral abilities, such as problem solving, reasoning and normal intelligence.

The psychopathology of LFS usually exhibits schizophrenia. When schizophrenia is diagnosed in an individual known to be affected by intellectual disability, LFS may be considered in the differential diagnosis of schizophrenia, with confirmation of cause through appropriate psychiatric and genetic evaluation methods.

=== Marfanoid habitus ===
LFS is clinically distinguished from other X-linked forms of intellectual disability by the accompanying presence of marfanoid habitus. Marfanoid habitus describes a group of physical features common to Marfan syndrome. Including Marfan syndrome and LFS, marfanoid features of this type have also been observed with several other disorders, one of which is multiple endocrine neoplasia type 2.

In LFS, specific features identified as marfanoid include: a long, narrow face; tall, thin stature; long, slender limbs, fingers and toes (not unlike arachnodactyly) with joint hyperextensibility, shortened halluces (the big toes) and long second toes.

The diagnosis of marfanoid habitus in LFS is often delayed because many of the physical features and characteristics associated with it are usually not evident until adolescence.

=== Head and face ===
Craniofacial and other features of LFS include: maxillary hypoplasia (underdevelopment of the upper jaw bone), a small mandible (lower jaw bone) and receding chin, a high-arched palate (the roof of the mouth), with crowding and misalignment of the upper teeth; macrocephaly (enlarged skull) with a prominent forehead, hypernasal speech (voice), a long nose with a high, narrow nasal bridge; a deep, short philtrum (the indentation in the upper lip, beneath the nose), low-set ears with some apparent retroversion, hypotonia (decreased muscle tone), pectus excavatum (a malformity of the chest), slightly enlarged to normal testicular size in males, and seizures.

Hypernasal speech, or "hypernasality", is primarily the result of velopharyngeal insufficiency, a sometimes congenital aberration in which the velopharyngeal sphincter allows too much air into the nasal cavity during speech. In LFS, hypernasality may also be caused by failure of the soft palate and uvula to reach the back wall of the pharynx (the interior cavity of the throat where swallowing generally occurs) during speech, a condition that can be associated with a submucosal cleft palate.

=== Heart ===
A number of features involving the heart have been noted in several LFS cases, the most significant being dilation of the aortic root, a section of the ascending aorta. Aortic root dilation (enlargement) is associated with a greatly increased risk of dissection of the aortic wall, resulting in aortic aneurysm. As this presents a possible life-threatening consequence of LFS, routine cardiac evaluation methods such as echocardiogram are implemented when the disorder is first diagnosed, along with MRI scans of the brain to screen for suspected agenesis of the corpus callosum. Additional effects on the heart that have been reported with LFS are ventricular and atrial septal defect.

== Cause ==
A missense mutation in the MED12 gene, located on the human X chromosome, has been established as the cause of LFS. Missense mutations are genetic point mutations in which a single nucleotide in the genetic sequence is exchanged with another one. This leads to an erroneous substitution of a particular amino acid in the protein sequence during translation. The missense mutation in the MED12 gene, that causes LFS, is identified as p.N1007S. This indicates that the amino acid asparagine, normally located at position 1007 along the MED12 sequence, has been mistakenly replaced by serine. This mutation in MED12 causes incorrect expression and activity of the protein it encodes, resulting in the disorder.

== Pathophysiology ==
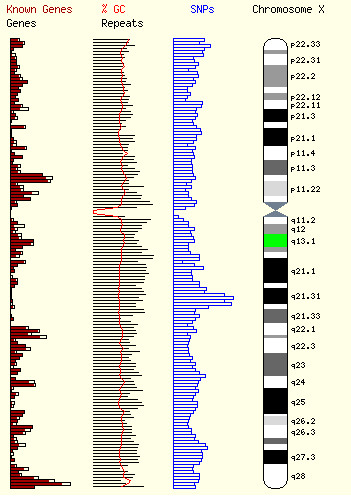
Known genes and mutations found on the human X chromosome. The MED12 gene is found at location q13, highlighted in green.

MED12, or mediator of RNA polymerase II transcription, subunit 12 homolog of S. cerevisiae, is one of several subunits in the mammalian mediator complex, which regulates RNA polymerase II during mRNA transcription.

The Mediator complex is required for polymerase II transcription and acts as a bridge between the polymerase II enzyme and different gene-specific transcription factors. Mediator can contain up to 30 subunits, but some of the subunits are only required for regulation of transcription in particular tissues or cells. Currently, the exact mechanism by which dysfunction of MED12 results in LFS and its associated neuropsychopathic and physical characteristics is unclear. Marfanoid habitus, a highly arched palate and several other features of LFS can be found with Marfan syndrome, a connective tissue disorder. The finding of aortic root dilation in both disorders suggests that a mutation in an unspecified connective tissue regulating gene may contribute to the etiology of LFS.

A number of interesting experimental results have been obtained by studying MED12 mutations in the zebrafish, an animal model representing vertebrates. In zebrafish, a mutation in MED12 was found to be responsible for the mutant motionless (mot). Zebrafish with the mot mutation have neuronal and cardiovascular defects, although not all types of neurons are affected. Introduction of human MED12 mRNA into the zebrafish restores normal development. MED12 is also a critical coactivator for the gene SOX9, which is involved in the developmental regulation of neurons, cartilage and bone. In the zebrafish, MED12 defects cause maldevelopment of vertebrate embryonic structures such as the neural crest, which would alter function of the autonomic and peripheral nervous systems; and they also cause malformations of cell types serving as precursors to cartilage and bone, such as osteocytes. Some features found in LFS, like agenesis of the corpus callosum and cartilage-related craniofacial anomalies, are similar to defects found in zebrafish with MED12 and associated mutations.

=== Genetics ===
This condition is inherited in an X-linked dominant manner.

Lujan–Fryns syndrome is inherited in an X-linked dominant manner. This means the defective gene responsible for the disorder (MED12) is located on the X chromosome, and only one copy of the defective gene is sufficient to cause the disorder when inherited from a parent who has the disorder. Males are normally hemizygous for the X chromosome, having only one copy. As a result, X-linked dominant disorders usually show higher expressivity in males than females. This phenomenon is thought to occur with LFS.

As the X chromosome is one of the sex chromosomes (the other being the Y chromosome), X-linked inheritance is determined by the karyotype of the parent carrying a specific gene and can often seem complex. This is because, typically, females have two copies of the X-chromosome, while males have only one copy. The difference between dominant and recessive inheritance patterns also plays a role in determining the chances of a child inheriting an X-linked disorder from their parentage.

In LFS, X-linked dominant inheritance was suspected, as boy and girl siblings in one family both exhibited the disorder. A scenario such as this would also be possible with X-linked recessive inheritance, but in this particular case report, the girl was believed to be a manifesting heterozygote carrying one copy of the mutated gene.

Sporadic cases of LFS, where the disorder is present in an individual with no prior family history of it, have also been reported in a small number of affected males.

=== Similarities to other genetic diseases ===
An individual exhibiting intellectual disability and other symptoms similar to LFS was found to have a terminal deletion of the subtelomeric region in the short arm of chromosome 5. Deletion of this area of chromosome 5 is associated with intellectual disability, psychotic behavior, autism, macrocephaly and hypernasal-like speech, as well as the disorder Cri du chat syndrome. Fryns (2006) suggests a detailed examination of chromosome 5 with FISH should be performed as part of the differential diagnosis of LFS.

Mutations in the UPF3B gene, also found on the X chromosome, are another cause of X-linked intellectual disability. UPF3B is part of the nonsense-mediated mRNA decay (NMD) complex, which performs mRNA surveillance, detecting mRNA sequences that have been erroneously truncated (shortened) by the presence of nonsense mutations. Mutations in UPF3B alter and prevent normal function of the NMD pathway, resulting in translation and expression of truncated mRNA sequences into malfunctioning proteins that can be associated with developmental errors and intellectual disability. Individuals from two families diagnosed with LFS and one family with FGS were found to have mutations in UPF3B, confirming that the clinical presentations of the different mutations can overlap.

== Diagnosis ==
Although LFS is usually suspected when intellectual disability and marfanoid habitus are observed together in a patient, the diagnosis of LFS can be confirmed by the presence of the p.N1007S missense mutation in the MED12 gene.

=== Differential diagnosis ===
In the differential diagnosis of LFS, another disorder that exhibits some features and symptoms of LFS and is also associated with a missense mutation of MED12 is Opitz-Kaveggia syndrome (FGS). Common features shared by both LFS and FGS include X-linked intellectual disability, hyperactivity, macrocephaly, corpus callosum agenesis and hypotonia. Notable features of FGS that have not been reported with LFS include excessive talkativeness, consistent strength in socialization skills, imperforate anus (occlusion of the anus) and ocular hypertelorism (extremely wide-set eyes).

Whereas LFS is associated with missense mutation p.N1007S, FGS is associated with missense mutation p.R961W. As both disorders originate from an identical type of mutation in the same gene, while exhibiting similar, yet distinct characteristics; LFS and FGS are considered to be allelic. In the context of MED12, this suggests that the phenotype of each disorder is related to the way in which their respective mutations alter the MED12 sequence and its function.

== Treatment ==
While there is no specific treatment for the underlying genetic cause of LFS, corrective procedures, preventive intervention measures, and therapies may be considered in the treatment and management of the many craniofacial, orthopedic, and psychiatric problems associated with the disorder. More pressing issues such as cardiac involvement or epileptic seizures should be routinely examined and monitored. Close attention and specialized follow-up care, including neuro-psychological evaluation methods and therapies, and special education, should be given to diagnose and prevent psychiatric disorders and related behavioral problems such as psychosis and outbursts of aggression.

== Epidemiology ==
Lujan–Fryns syndrome is a rare X-linked dominant syndrome and is more common in males than females. Its prevalence within the general population has not yet been determined.

== History ==
Lujan–Fryns syndrome is named after physicians J. Enrique Lujan and Jean-Pierre Fryns. The initial observation of suspected X-linked intellectual disability with Marfanoid features and craniofacial effects such as a high-arched palate was described by Lujan et al. in 1984. In the report, four affected male members of a large kindred (consanguinous family) were noted. Additional investigations of combined X-linked intellectual disability and Marfanoid habitus in other families, including two brothers, were reported by Fryns et al., beginning in 1987. The disorder soon became known as Lujan–Fryns syndrome.

== See also ==
- Fragile X syndrome
- Aarskog syndrome
- Coffin–Lowry syndrome
- FG syndrome
