= Laryngeal cleft =

Medical condition

A laryngeal cleft or laryngotracheoesophageal cleft is a rare congenital abnormality in the posterior laryngo-tracheal wall. It occurs in approximately 1 in 10,000 to 20,000 births. It means there is a communication between the oesophagus and the trachea, which allows food or fluid to pass into the airway.

== Presentation ==
=== Associated conditions ===
Twenty to 27% of individuals with a laryngeal cleft also have a tracheoesophageal fistula and approximately 6% of individuals with a fistula also have a cleft. Other congenital anomalies commonly associated with laryngeal cleft are gastro-oesophageal reflux, tracheobronchomalacia, congenital heart defect, dextrocardia and situs inversus. Laryngeal cleft can also be a component of other genetic syndromes, including Pallister–Hall syndrome and G syndrome (Opitz-Frias syndrome).

== Diagnosis ==
Laryngeal cleft is usually diagnosed in an infant after they develop problems with feeding, such as coughing, cyanosis (blue lips) and failing to gain weight over time. Pulmonary infections are also common. The longer the cleft, the more severe are the symptoms. Laryngeal cleft is suspected after a video swallow study (VSS) shows material flowing into the airway rather than the esophagus, and diagnosis is confirmed through endoscopic examination, specifically microlaryngoscopy and bronchoscopy. If a laryngeal cleft is not seen on flexible nasopharyngoscopy, that does not mean that there is not one there. Laryngeal clefts are classified into four types according to Benjamin and Inglis. Type I clefts extend down to the vocal cords; Type II clefts extend below the vocal cords and into the cricoid cartilage; Type III clefts extend into the cervical trachea and Type IV clefts extend into the thoracic trachea. Subclassification of type IV clefts into Type IVA (extension to 5 mm below the innominate artery) and Type IV B (extension greater than 5 mm below the innominate artery) may help with preoperative selection of those who can be repaired via transtracheal approach (Type IV A) versus a cricotracheal separation approach (type IV B).

== Treatment ==
Treatment of a laryngeal cleft depends on the length and resulting severity of symptoms. A shallow cleft (Type I) may not require surgical intervention. Symptoms may be able to be managed by thickening the infant's feeds. If symptomatic, Type I clefts can be sutured closed or injected with filler as a temporary fix to determine if obliterating the cleft is beneficial and whether or not a more formal closure is required at a later date. Slightly longer clefts (Type II and short Type III) can be repaired endoscopically. Short type IV clefts extending to within 5 mm below the innominate artery can be repaired through the neck by splitting the trachea vertically in the midline and suturing the back layers of the esophagus and trachea closed. A long, tapered piece of rib graft can be placed between the esophageal and tracheal layers to make them rigid so the patient will not require a tracheotomy after the surgery and to decrease chances of fistula postoperatively. Long Type IV clefts extending further than 5 mm below the innominate artery cannot be reached with a vertical incision in the trachea, and therefore are best repaired through cricotracheal resection. This involves separating the trachea from the cricoid cartilage, leaving the patient intubated through the trachea, suturing each of the esophagus and the back wall of the trachea closed independently, and then reattaching the trachea to the cricoid cartilage. This prevents the need for pulmonary bypass or extracorporeal membrane oxygenation.
