= MID1 =

Protein-coding gene in humans

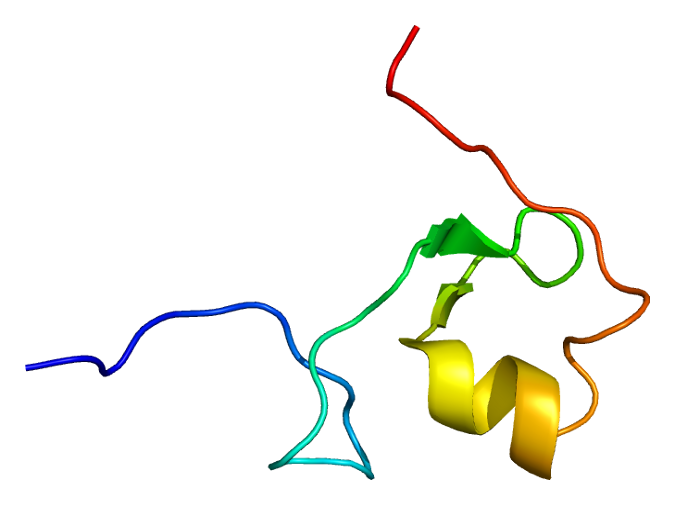

Identifiers
- Aliases: MID1, BBBG1, FXY, GBBB1, MIDIN, OGS1, OS, OSX, RNF59, TRIM18, XPRF, ZNFXY, midline 1, GBBB
- External IDs: OMIM: 300552; MGI: 1100537; GeneCards: MID1
Available structures
PDB	Ortholog search: PDBe RCSB
PDB	List of PDB id codes 2DQ5, 2FFW, 2JUN, 5IM8
Enzyme activity
EC #	BRENDA	ExPASy	KEGG	MetaCyc
2.3.2.27	↗	↗	↗	↗

Gene location (Human)
Chr.	X chromosome (human)
Band	Xp22.2	Start	10,445,310 bp
Band	Xp22.2	End	10,833,654 bp

Gene location (Mouse)
Chr.	X chromosome (mouse)
Band	X F5|X 79.19 cM	Start	168,468,195 bp
Band	X F5|X 79.19 cM	End	168,788,732 bp
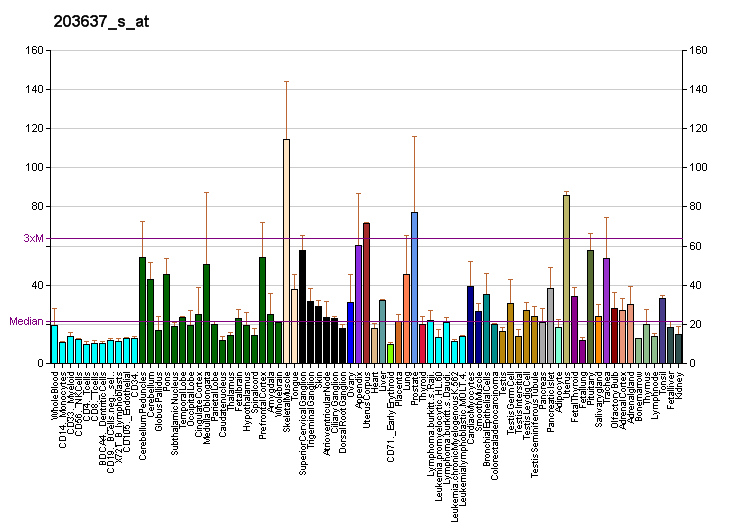

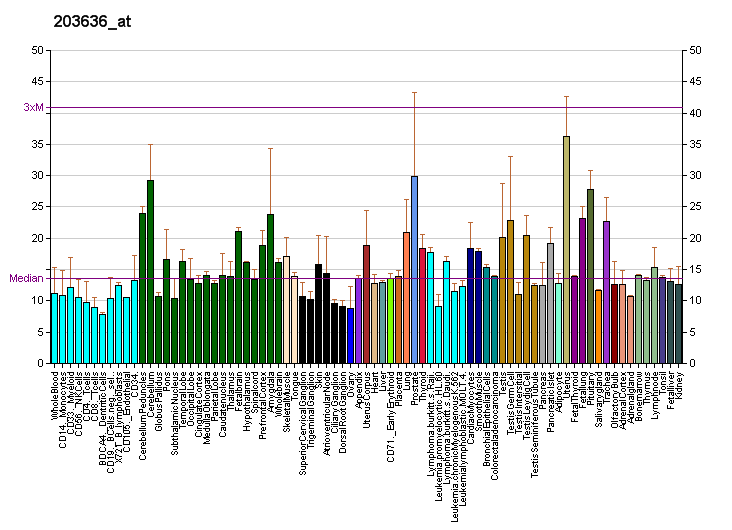
RNA expression pattern
Bgee	Human / Mouse (ortholog); Top expressed in: mucosa of paranasal sinus; ventricular zone; pancreatic ductal cell; hair follicle; bronchial epithelial cell; seminal vesicula; right ventricle; Epithelium of choroid plexus; ganglionic eminence; mucosa of urinary bladder / Top expressed in: neural layer of retina; genital tubercle; zygote; ventricular zone; Paneth cell; maxillary prominence; internal carotid artery; ciliary body; tail of embryo; mandibular prominence; More reference expression data
BioGPS	More reference expression data
Gene ontology
Molecular function	protein homodimerization activity; microtubule binding; zinc ion binding; metal ion binding; phosphoprotein binding; protein binding; identical protein binding; protein heterodimerization activity; ubiquitin protein ligase binding; transferase activity
Cellular component	cytoplasm; cytosol; microtubule cytoskeleton; spindle; intracellular anatomical structure; microtubule associated complex; cytoplasmic microtubule; microtubule; cytoskeleton
Biological process	pattern specification process; interferon-gamma-mediated signaling pathway; negative regulation of microtubule depolymerization; protein localization to microtubule; microtubule cytoskeleton organization; positive regulation of stress-activated MAPK cascade
Sources:Amigo / QuickGO
Orthologs
Databases	NCBI: entry; OMA: entry
Species	Human	Mouse
Entrez	4281	17318
Ensembl	ENSG00000101871	ENSMUSG00000035299
UniProt	O15344	O70583
RefSeq (mRNA)	NM_000381; NM_001098624; NM_001193277; NM_001193278; NM_001193279 NM_001193280; NM_001193281; NM_033289; NM_033290; NM_033291; NM_001347733	NM_001290504; NM_001290505; NM_001290506; NM_001290512; NM_010797 NM_183151
RefSeq (protein)	NP_000372; NP_001092094; NP_001180206; NP_001180207; NP_001180208 NP_001180209; NP_001334662; NP_150631; NP_150632	NP_001277433; NP_001277434; NP_001277435; NP_001277441; NP_034927
Location (UCSC)	Chr X: 10.45 – 10.83 Mb	Chr X: 168.47 – 168.79 Mb
PubMed search
- Wikidata
View/Edit Human	View/Edit Mouse

MID1 is a protein that belongs to the Tripartite motif family (TRIM) and is also known as TRIM18. The MID1 gene is located on the short arm of the X chromosome and loss-of-function mutations in this gene are causative of the X-linked form of a rare developmental disease, Opitz G/BBB Syndrome.

== The MID1 gene and its product ==
The human MID1 gene is located on the short arm of the X chromosome (Xp22.2) and includes 9 coding exons, spanning approximately 400 kb of the genome. Upstream to the first coding exon, the MID1 gene employs alternative 5' untranslated exons and at least five alternative promoters that drive the transcription of the gene, resulting in several MID1 transcript isoforms. The MID1 gene encodes a 667 amino acid protein that belongs to the TRIM family. MID1 protein consists of a conserved N-terminal tripartite module composed of a RING domain, 2 B-Box domains (B-box 1 and B-box 2) and a coiled-coil region. Within the TRIM family, MID1 belongs to the C-I subgroup characterised by the presence, downstream to the tripartite motif, of a COS domain, a Fibronectin type III (FN3) repeat and a PRY-SPRY domain.

== MID1 main cellular functions ==
=== MID1 as an E3 ubiquitin ligase ===
MID1 is a microtubular protein that acts as an ubiquitin E3 ligase in vitro and in cells. Ubiquitination is a type of post-translational modification in which the transfer of one or several ubiquitin peptide molecules to substrates determines their stability and/or activity. The MID1 E3 ubiquitin ligase activity is catalysed by the RING domain, a hallmark of one of the main classes of E3 ubiquitin ligases that, within the ubiquitination cascade, facilitate the transfer of the ubiquitin peptide to specific substrates. Several MID1 E3 ubiquitin ligase targets have been reported: Alpha4 (α4) and its associated phosphatase, PP2A, Fu, Pax6 and BRAF35.

=== MID1-α4-PP2A complex ===
Together with α4 and PP2A, MID1 can form a ternary complex in which α4 acts as an adaptor protein. The data so far indicate that MID1 promotes α4 mono-ubiquitination, leading to its calpain-dependent cleavage that in turn causes PP2A catalytic subunit (PP2Ac) polyubiquitination and proteasomal degradation. Since PP2A is involved in many cellular processes, the MID1-α4-PP2A ternary complex may be involved in the regulation of several of them, mainly on microtubules. The complex can modulate mTORC1 signalling; indeed PP2A attenuates mTORC1 activity through dephosphorylation. By lowering PP2Ac levels, MID1 leads to increase mTORC1 signalling. Conversely, the lack or loss-of-function mutations of MID1 lead to increased levels of PP2A and, as a consequence, to a general hypo-phosphorylation of PP2A targets, included mTORC1. The signalling of mTORC1 is implicated in cytoskeletal dynamics, intracellular transport, cell migration, autophagy, protein synthesis, cell metabolism, so it is possible that MID1, by controlling PP2Ac, is ultimately implicated in some of these cellular processes.

=== MID1 and Sonic Hedgehog ===
MID1 is also involved is the Sonic Hedgehog (Shh) pathway. MID1 catalyses the ubiquitination and proteasomal-dependent cleavage of Fu, a kinase involved in Hedgehog signalling pathway. The cleavage of the kinase domain of Fu favours the translocation of the transcription factor GLI3A (activator form) in the nucleus. In this way, GLI3A activates the expression of Shh target genes, leading to an increase of Shh signalling. The cross talk between MID1 and the Shh pathway is also supported by experimental evidence in model organisms.

== Role and expression during embryonic development ==
MID1 is nearly ubiquitously expressed in all embryonic tissues, having an important function during development. Several model organisms have been used to study the expression pattern of MID1 transcript at different times of gestation: mouse, chicken, xenopus and also human embryos. At the very early stage of embryonic development, MID1 is expressed in the primitive node where MID1 plays a pivotal role in establishing the molecular asymmetry at the node, which is crucial for the early definition of the laterality as embryonic development progresses. Later in embryogenesis, at the neurulation stage, MID1 transcript is mainly observed in the cranial region of the developing neural folds. Starting from midgestation, the highest levels of MID1 transcript are observed in the proliferating compartments of the central nervous system and in the epithelia of the developing branchial arches, craniofacial processes, optic vesicle, in the heart and in the gastrointestinal and urogenital system.

== Clinical significance ==
The MID1 gene was identified concomitantly with the discovery that it was causatively mutated in patients with a rare genetic disease, the X-linked form of Opitz G/BBB syndrome (XLOS) (OMIM #300000). XLOS is a congenital malformative disorder characterised by defects in the embryonic development of midline structures. XLOS is characterised by high variability of the clinical signs and, being X-linked, males are generally affected. The most frequently observed signs are: dysmorphic features, mainly represented by hypertelorism often associated with cleft lip and palate, frontal bossing, large nasal bridge, and low-set ears. Laryngo-tracheo-esophageal abnormalities are also frequently observed in XLOS patients as well as external genitalia abnormalities that are predominantly represented by various-degree-hypospadias. In addition, XLOS patients can present cardiac abnormalities and anal defects. XLOS also shows a neurological component represented by cerebellar vermis hypoplasia and agenesis or hypoplasia of the corpus callosum accompanied by intellectual disabilities and developmental delays. Since its discovery as the causative gene for XLOS, approximately one hundred different pathogenetic mutations have been described in the MID1 gene. Even though the type and the distribution of mutations suggested a loss-of-function mechanism in the pathogenesis of Opitz syndrome, the aetiology of the disease remains still unclear. Additional clinical conditions are described to be associated with alterations of MID1, given also its implication in a wide variety of cellular mechanisms. In fact, involvement of MID1 in asthma, cancer, and neurodegeneration relevant pathways has been reported.
