= Cyclin-dependent kinase 8 =

Protein-coding gene in the species Homo sapiens

CDK8

Identifiers
- Aliases: CDK8, K35, cyclin-dependent kinase 8, cyclin dependent kinase 8, IDDHBA
- External IDs: OMIM: 603184; MGI: 1196224; GeneCards: CDK8
Available structures
PDB	Ortholog search: PDBe RCSB
PDB	List of PDB id codes 3RGF, 4F6S, 4F6U, 4F6W, 4F70, 4F7J, 4F7L, 4F7N, 4F7S, 4G6L, 4CRL, 5HBH, 5CEI, 5FGK, 5HBE, 5BNJ, 5HBJ, 5HVY, 5HNB, 5I5Z
Enzyme activity
EC #	BRENDA	ExPASy	KEGG	MetaCyc
2.7.11.22	↗	↗	↗	↗
2.7.11.23	↗	↗	↗	↗

Gene location (Human)
Chr.	Chromosome 13 (human)
Band	13q12.13	Start	26,254,104 bp
Band	13q12.13	End	26,405,238 bp

Gene location (Mouse)
Chr.	Chromosome 5 (mouse)
Band	5|5 G3	Start	146,168,040 bp
Band	5|5 G3	End	146,239,684 bp
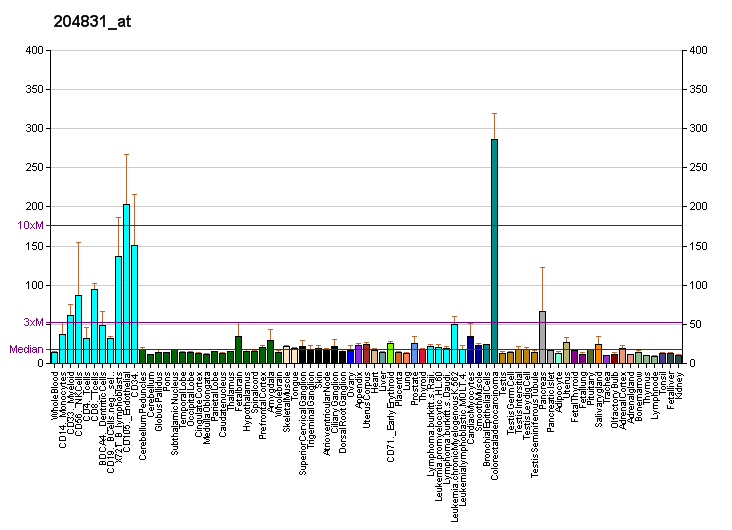
RNA expression pattern
Bgee	Human / Mouse (ortholog); Top expressed in: buccal mucosa cell; secondary oocyte; sperm; parietal pleura; endothelial cell; muscle layer of sigmoid colon; visceral pleura; amniotic fluid; jejunal mucosa; ganglionic eminence / Top expressed in: ureter; secondary oocyte; primitive streak; zygote; medullary collecting duct; mandibular prominence; Paneth cell; somite; vestibular sensory epithelium; maxillary prominence; More reference expression data
BioGPS	More reference expression data
Gene ontology
Molecular function	transferase activity; protein kinase activity; nucleotide binding; kinase activity; protein binding; RNA polymerase II CTD heptapeptide repeat kinase activity; ATP binding; protein serine/threonine kinase activity; cyclin-dependent protein serine/threonine kinase activity
Cellular component	mediator complex; nucleoplasm; nucleus; nucleolus; protein-containing complex
Biological process	regulation of transcription, DNA-templated; phosphorylation; protein phosphorylation; transcription initiation from RNA polymerase II promoter; positive regulation of transcription by RNA polymerase II; transcription, DNA-templated; regulation of mitotic cell cycle; regulation of cell cycle
Sources:Amigo / QuickGO
Orthologs
Databases	NCBI: entry; OMA: entry
Species	Human	Mouse
Entrez	1024	264064
Ensembl	ENSG00000132964	ENSMUSG00000029635
UniProt	P49336	Q8R3L8
RefSeq (mRNA)	NM_001260; NM_001318368; NM_001346501	NM_153599; NM_181570; NM_001359990; NM_001359991
RefSeq (protein)	NP_001251; NP_001305297; NP_001333430	NP_705827; NP_001346919; NP_001346920
Location (UCSC)	Chr 13: 26.25 – 26.41 Mb	Chr 5: 146.17 – 146.24 Mb
PubMed search
- Wikidata
View/Edit Human	View/Edit Mouse

Cell division protein kinase 8 is an enzyme that in humans is encoded by the CDK8 gene.

== Function ==
The protein encoded by this gene is a member of the cyclin-dependent protein kinase (CDK) family. CDK8 and cyclin C associate with the mediator complex and regulate transcription by several mechanisms. CDK8 binds to and/or phosphorylates several transcription factors, which can have an activating or inhibitory effect on transcription factor function. CDK8 phosphorylates the Notch intracellular domain, SREBP, and STAT1 S727. CDK8 also inhibits transcriptional activation by influencing turnover of subunits in the mediator complex tail module. In addition, CDK8 influences binding of RNA polymerase II to the mediator complex.

== Clinical significance ==
CDK8 is a colorectal cancer oncogene: the CDK8 gene is amplified in human colorectal tumors, activating β-catenin-mediated transcription that drives colon tumorigenesis. However, CDK8 may not be oncogenic in all cell types, and indeed may act as a tumor suppressor in the notch and EGFR signaling pathways. Specifically, CDK8 promotes turnover of the notch intracellular domain, and inhibits EGFR signaling-driven cell fates in C. elegans. Thus, CDK8 may be an oncogene in cancers driven by Wnt/β-catenin signaling, but could instead be a tumor suppressor gene in cancers driven by notch or EGFR signaling. In addition, CDK8 promotes transcriptional activation mediated by the tumor suppressor protein p53, indicating that it may have an important role in tumor suppression Further research is needed to delineate the effects of CDK8 inhibition in different tissues, so for the time being, drugs targeting CDK8 for cancer treatment remain untested in humans.

An autosomal dominant syndrome has been described that is associated with mutations in the ATP binding pocket of the kinase domain. The clinical features include agenesis of the corpus callosum, mild to moderate intellectual disability, hypotonia, seizures, hearing or visual impairments, behavioral disorders, variable facial dysmorphism, congenital heart disease and ano-rectal malformations.

== As a potential drug target ==
The natural product cortistatin A is a potent and selective inhibitor of CDK8 and CDK19. Inhibition of CDK8 and CDK19 with cortistatin A suppresses AML cell growth and has anticancer activity in animal models of AML by causing selective and disproportionate upregulation of super-enhancer-associated genes, including the cell identity genes CEBPA and IRF8.

Romaciclib is a dual CDK8 and CDK19 inhibitor which is being developed for the treatment of acute myeloid leukaemia (AML).

== Interactions ==
Cyclin-dependent kinase 8 has been shown to interact with:

- CCNC
- CREB binding protein
- CRSP3
- MED1
- MED12
- MED14
- MED16
- MED17
- MED21
- MED24
- MED26
- MED6
- Notch proteins
- POLR2A
- SMARCB1
- STAT1
- SREBP
