= Trisomy 18 =

Chromosomal disorder in which there are three copies of chromosome 18

- Other names: Trisomy 18 (T18), chromosome 18 duplication, trisomy E syndrome, Edwards syndrome
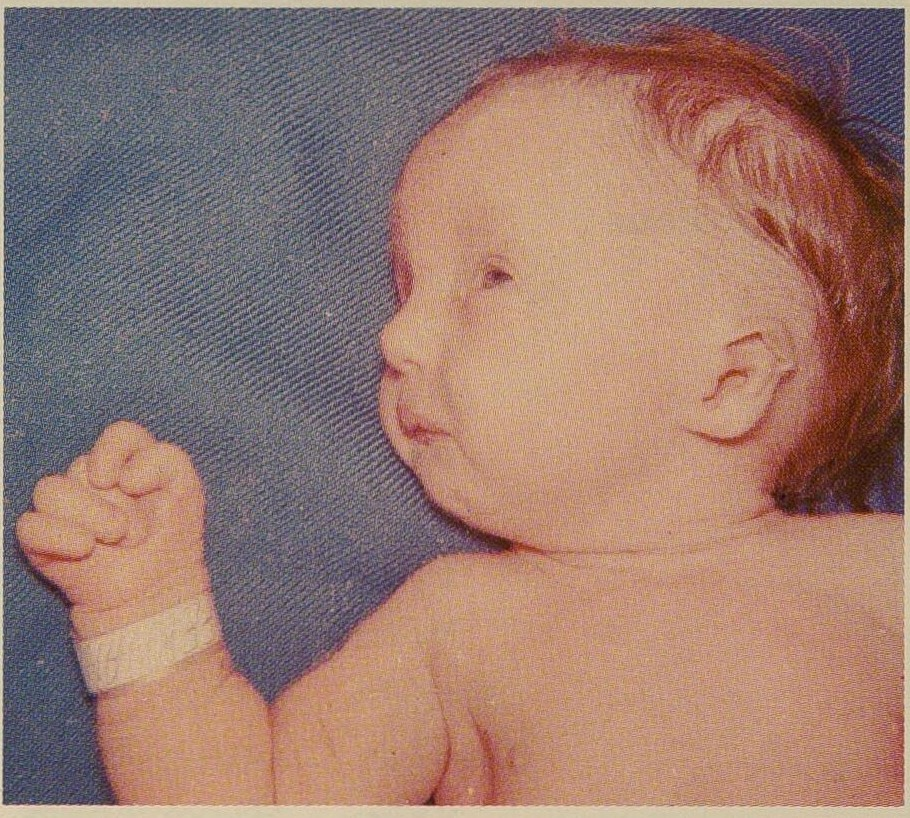
- Infant with trisomy 18
- Specialty: Medical genetics, pediatrics
- Symptoms: Small head, small jaw, clenched fists with overlapping fingers, profound intellectual disability
- Complications: Heart defects
- Usual onset: Present at birth
- Causes: Third copy of chromosome 18 (usually new mutation)
- Risk factors: Older mother
- Diagnostic method: Ultrasound, amniocentesis
- Treatment: Supportive care
- Prognosis: 5–10% survive past a year old
- Frequency: 1 per 5,000 births

Trisomy 18, also known as Edwards syndrome, is a genetic disorder. Many parts of the body are affected. Babies are often born small and have heart defects. Other features include a small head, small jaw, clenched fists with overlapping fingers, and severe intellectual disability.

Most cases of trisomy 18 are due to problems during the formation of the reproductive cells or during early development. The chance of this condition occurring increases with the mother's age. Rarely, cases may be inherited. Occasionally, not all cells have the extra chromosome, known as mosaic trisomy, and symptoms in these cases may be less severe. An ultrasound during pregnancy can increase suspicion for the condition, which can be confirmed by amniocentesis.

Treatment is supportive. After having one child with the condition, a woman's risk of having a second is typically around one percent. It is the second-most common condition due to a third chromosome at birth, after Down syndrome for a third chromosome 21.

Trisomy 18 occurs in around 1 in 5,000 live births. Many of those affected die before birth. Some studies suggest that more babies that survive to birth are female. Survival beyond a year of life is around 5–10%. It is named after the English geneticist John Hilton Edwards, who first described the syndrome in 1960.

== Signs and symptoms ==
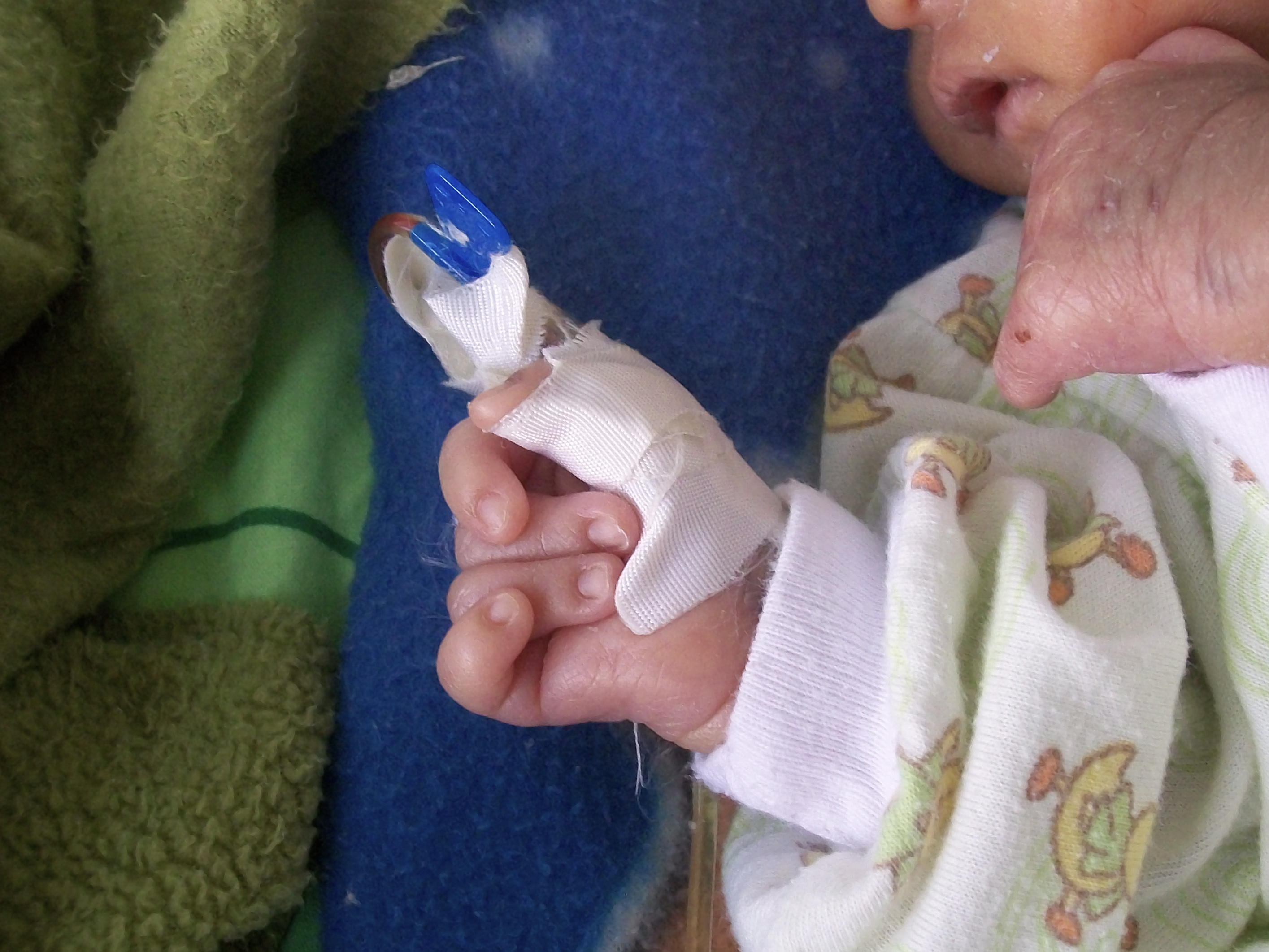
Clenched hand and overlapping fingers: index finger overlaps third finger and fifth finger overlaps fourth finger, characteristically seen in trisomy 18. This is caused by congenital joint contracture.

Children born with Edwards' syndrome may have some or all of these characteristics: kidney malformations, structural heart defects at birth (e.g., ventricular septal defect, atrial septal defect, patent ductus arteriosus), intestines protruding outside the body (omphalocele), esophageal atresia, intellectual disability, developmental delays, growth deficiency, feeding difficulties, breathing difficulties, and arthrogryposis (a muscle disorder that causes multiple joint contractures at birth).

Some physical malformations associated with Edwards' syndrome include small head (microcephaly) accompanied by a prominent back portion of the head (occiput), low-set, malformed ears, abnormally small jaw (micrognathia), cleft lip/cleft palate, upturned nose, narrow eyelid openings (blepharophimosis), widely spaced eyes (ocular hypertelorism), drooping of the upper eyelids (ptosis), a short breast bone, clenched hands, choroid plexus cysts, underdeveloped thumbs and/or nails, absent radius, webbing of the second and third toes, clubfoot or rocker bottom feet, and in males, undescended testicles.

In utero, the most common characteristic is cardiac anomalies, followed by central nervous system anomalies such as head shape abnormalities. The most common intracranial anomaly is the presence of choroid plexus cysts, which are pockets of fluid on the brain. These are not problematic in themselves, but their presence may be a marker for trisomy 18. Sometimes, excess amniotic fluid or polyhydramnios is exhibited. Although uncommon in the syndrome, trisomy 18 causes a large portion of prenatally diagnosed cases of Dandy–Walker malformation.

== Genetics ==
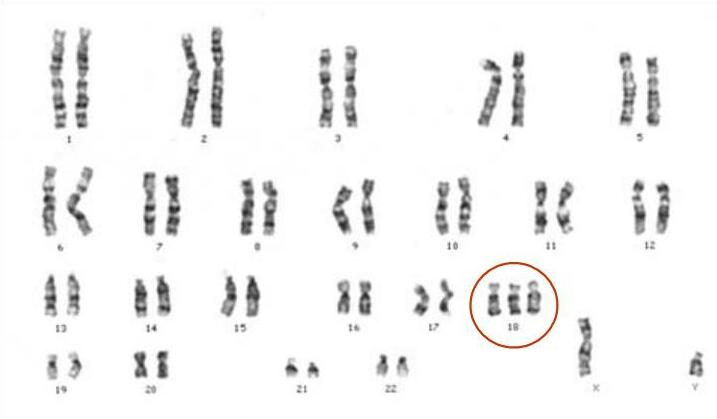
Karyotype of a person with trisomy 18. Three copies of the Chromosome 18 are detected.

Trisomy 18 is a chromosomal abnormality characterized by the presence of an extra copy of genetic material on the 18th chromosome, either in whole (trisomy 18) or in part (such as due to translocations). The additional chromosome usually occurs before conception. The effects of the extra copy vary greatly, depending on the extent of the extra copy, genetic history, and chance. Trisomy 18 occurs in all human populations but is more prevalent in female offspring.

A typical egg or sperm cell contains individual chromosomes, each of which contributes to the 23 pairs of chromosomes needed to form a normal cell with a typical human karyotype of 46 chromosomes. Numerical errors can arise at either of the two meiotic divisions and cause the failure of a chromosome to segregate into the daughter cells (nondisjunction). This results in an extra chromosome, making the haploid number 24 rather than 23. Fertilization of eggs or insemination by sperm that contain an extra chromosome results in trisomy, or three copies of a chromosome rather than two.

Trisomy 18 (47,XX,+18) is caused by a meiotic nondisjunction event. In nondisjunction, a pair of chromosomes fails to separate during cell division; thus, a gamete (i.e., a sperm or egg cell) is produced with an extra copy of a chromosome (for a total of 24 chromosomes). When combined with a normal gamete from the other parent, the resulting embryo has 47 chromosomes, with three copies of the problematic chromosome (in this case, chromosome 18). (Although an embryo could inherit a trisomy from both parents, it is, as a rule, extremely rare, and worse in terms of clinical perspective and prognosis.)

A small percentage of cases occur when only some of the body's cells have an extra copy of chromosome 18, resulting in a mixed population of cells with a differing number of chromosomes. Such cases are sometimes called mosaic trisomy 18. Very rarely, a piece of chromosome 18 becomes attached to another chromosome (translocated) before or after conception. Affected individuals have two copies of chromosome 18 plus extra material from chromosome 18 attached to another chromosome. With a translocation, a person has a partial trisomy for chromosome 18, and the abnormalities are often less severe than for the typical trisomy 18.

== Diagnosis ==
Ultrasound can increase suspicion of the condition, which can be confirmed by CVS or amniocentesis.

Levels of PAPP-A, AFP, and uE3 are generally decreased during pregnancy, and free beta HCG is elevated.

== Prognosis ==
About 60% of pregnancies that are affected do not result in a live birth. Major causes of death include hypoxia and heart abnormalities. It is impossible to predict an exact prognosis during pregnancy or the neonatal period. Half of the live infants do not survive beyond the first week of life without interventions. The median lifespan is five to 15 days without interventions. About 8–12% of infants survive longer than 1 year without interventions. One percent of children live to age 10. However, a retrospective Canadian study of 254 children with trisomy 18 demonstrated ten-year survival of 9.8%, and another found that 68.6% of children with surgical intervention survived infancy. Though rare, some persons with Trisomy 18 survive into their twenties and thirties.

== Epidemiology ==
Trisomy 18 occurs in about 1 in 5,000 live births, but more pregnancies are affected by the syndrome as the majority of those diagnosed with the condition prenatally will not survive to birth. Although women in their teens, 20s, and early 30s may conceive babies with trisomy 18, the risk increases with age. The average maternal age for conceiving a child with this disorder is 32.5.

== History ==
Trisomy 18 was first identified by John Hilton Edwards in 1960, although he originally believed it to be caused by a trisomy of chromosome 17. Klaus Patau and Eeva Therman reported another two cases shortly thereafter. They identified the extra chromosome as being part of what Patau's lab called "group E", containing chromosomes 16, 17, and 18, but were unable to determine which chromosome was responsible at the time. Analyzing 5 more cases, they were able to determine that the extra chromosome was chromosome 18.

== See also ==
- 18q deletion syndrome
