= FG syndrome =

Rare genetic disease

- Other names: Opitz–Kaveggia syndrome, FGS1
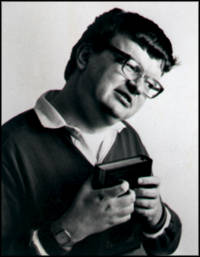
- Kim Peek (1951–2009), an American man with prodigious memory, was once believed to be autistic but a 2008 study proposed he had FG syndrome.
- Specialty: Medical genetics
- Usual onset: Birth
- Duration: Lifelong
- Risk factors: Family history (genetics)
- Differential diagnosis: Lujan-Fryns syndrome

FG syndrome (FGS) is a rare genetic syndrome caused by one or more recessive genes located on the X chromosome and causing physical anomalies and developmental delays. FG syndrome was named after the first letters of the surnames of the first patients noted with the disease. First reported by American geneticists John M. Opitz and Elisabeth G. Kaveggia in 1974, its major clinical features include intellectual disability, hyperactivity, hypotonia (low muscle tone), and a characteristic facial appearance including macrocephaly (an abnormally large head).

== Presentation ==
FG syndrome's major clinical features include physical disability, usually mild; hyperactive behavior, often with a slow personality; severe constipation, with or without structural anomalies in the anus such as imperforate anus; macrocephaly; severe hypotonia; a characteristic facial appearance due to hypotonia, giving a droopy, "open-mouthed" expression, a thin upper lip, a full or pouting lower lip; and most or complete loss of the corpus callosum. About a third of reported cases of individuals with FG syndrome die in infancy, usually due to respiratory infection; premature death is rare after infancy.

=== Developmental effects ===
Associated with agenesis (absence) of the corpus callosum, intellectual disabilities are common among individuals with FG syndrome. Motor ability is also impaired as a result of FG syndrome, and it also affects the development of semen. During childhood, problems arise in the gastrointestinal and gastroesophageal systems of the body. The most common gastrointestinal problems include constipation from an imperforate anus and gastroesophageal reflux. Cardiopulmonary defects contribute to roughly 60% of premature deaths in infants with FG syndrome. Septal defects are the most common. After infancy, long-term survival has been recorded beyond the age of 50.

== Genetics ==
Most mutations that cause FG syndrome can be found in the MED12 gene. However, mutations have also been found in FMR1, FLNA, UPF3B, CASK, MECP2 and ATRX genes. Mutations on these different genes lead to the different types of FG syndrome, all with similar characteristics. The FGS8 type mutation is the most common of the types, and is found in the MED12 gene.

Known types and affected genes include:

Type	OMIM	Gene	Locus
FGS1	305450	MED12	Xq13
FGS2	300321	FLNA	Xq28
FGS3	300406	FGS3	Xp22.3
FGS4	300422	CASK	Xp11.4-p11.3
FGS5	300581	FGS5	Xq22.3

=== MED12 gene ===
The MED12 gene codes for the mediator complex subunit 12 protein. The mediator complex is composed of around 25 different proteins that all help with the regulation of gene activity. This mediator complex regulates gene expression by bridging interaction between RNA polymerase II and gene-specific regulating proteins such as transcription factors, repressor proteins, activator proteins, etc. Changes to this complex and the proteins associated can have a severe impact on the production of new proteins. The MED12 gene is also thought to be highly linked to neuron development as well as high usage in the cells signal transduction pathway. This explains the slowed intellectual development individuals with FG syndrome have.

== Diagnosis ==
There is no established clinical diagnostic criteria for FG syndrome. A healthcare professional might consider the following clinical features in an individual as indicative for further evaluation:

- Neurodevelopmental delays
- A family history consistent with X-linked inheritance
- Characteristic facial features
  - Absolute or relative macrocephaly
  - Dolichocephaly
  - Frontal hair upsweep
  - Very large forehead
  - Downslanted palpebral fissures
  - Far-apart eyes
  - Missing part of the upper eyelids
  - Small, simple ears (≤10th percentile)
  - Open mouth
  - Long wide face
- Broad thumbs and halluces
- Congenital anomaly (corpus callosum, anal, cardiac, skeletal)
- Hypotonia, constipation, or feeding problems
- Characteristic behavior (affable and eager to please)

== Treatment ==
There is no specific treatment for FG syndrome. Physical defects may be correctable with surgery and behavioral issues may benefit from specialized treatment educational approaches and therapy.

== History ==
The name of the syndrome comes from the initials of the surnames of two sisters, who had five sons with the syndrome. The first study of the syndrome, published in 1974, established that it was linked to inheritance of the X chromosome.

== See also ==
- Lujan–Fryns syndrome
