= Cortistatins =

Cortistatin A

Names
- IUPAC name (1R,2R,3S,5R,8β,17β)-3-(Dimethylamino)-17-(isoquinolin-7-yl)-5,8-epoxy-9,19-cyclo-9,10-secoandrosta-9(11),10-diene-1,2-diol
- Other names Cortistatine A

Identifiers
CAS Number	882976-95-6
3D model (JSmol)	Interactive image
ChEBI	CHEBI:67171
ChemSpider	9736681
PubChem CID	11561907
UNII	6VG04XOV89
- InChI: InChI=1S/C30H36N2O3/c1-28-10-8-21-15-23-26(33)27(34)24(32(2)3)16-29(23)11-12-30(21,35-29)25(28)7-6-22(28)19-5-4-18-9-13-31-17-20(18)14-19/h4-5,8-9,13-15,17,22,24-27,33-34H,6-7,10-12,16H2,1-3H3/t22-,24+,25-,26-,27-,28-,29-,30-/m1/s1 Key: KSGZCKSNTAJOJS-DZBMUNJRSA-N; InChI=1/C30H36N2O3/c1-28-10-8-21-15-23-26(33)27(34)24(32(2)3)16-29(23)11-12-30(21,35-29)25(28)7-6-22(28)19-5-4-18-9-13-31-17-20(18)14-19/h4-5,8-9,13-15,17,22,24-27,33-34H,6-7,10-12,16H2,1-3H3/t22-,24+,25-,26-,27-,28-,29-,30-/m1/s1 Key: KSGZCKSNTAJOJS-DZBMUNJRBJ
- SMILES: C[C@]12CC=C3C=C4[C@H]([C@@H]([C@H](C[C@]45CC[C@@]3([C@@H]1CC[C@@H]2c6ccc7ccncc7c6)O5)N(C)C)O)O

Properties
Chemical formula	C_{30}H_{36}N_{2}O_{3}
Molar mass	472.629 g·mol^{−1}
- Except where otherwise noted, data are given for materials in their standard state (at 25 °C [77 °F], 100 kPa). Infobox references

The cortistatins are a group of steroidal alkaloids first isolated in 2006 from the marine sponge Corticium simplex. The cortistatins were first discovered in a search for naturally occurring compounds that inhibit proliferation of human umbilical vein endothelial cells (HUVECs), with cortistatin A being the most potent compound in the class.

The Shair group at Harvard along with collaborators have shown that cortistatin A is a highly potent and selective inhibitor of CDK8 and CDK19, the kinases that associate with Mediator complex. Out of 386 kinases evaluated, cortistatin A only inhibited CDK8 and CDK19, revealing that it is among the most selective kinase inhibitors. It was also shown that cortistatin A potently inhibits growth of acute myeloid leukemia cells and AML in two in vivo mouse models. Identification of dominant drug-resistant alleles of CDK8 and CDK19 demonstrate that these kinases mediate the activity of cortistatin A in AML cells. Thus, inhibition of CDK8 and CDK19 is a new therapeutic approach to AML. Cortistatin A caused selective and disproportionate up-regulation of super-enhancer-associated genes in AML cells which contributed to its anti-leukemic activity. This work indicated that CDK8 and CDK19 are negative regulators of super-enhancer-associated genes in AML.

Di-dehydrocortistatin A suppresses viral replication in cells infected with HIV via binding to the Tat protein.

Cortistatin A was synthesized first by Baran, thereafter by Shair, Myers, and Nicolaou labs.

== Chemical structures ==
Cortistatin A

Cortistatin B

Cortistatin C

Cortistatin D

Cortistatin E

Cortistatin F

Cortistatin G

Cortistatin H

Cortistatin J

Cortistatin K

Cortistatin L
