= MED12 =

Protein-coding gene in humans

Identifiers
- Aliases: MED12, ARC240, CAGH45, FGS1, HOPA, MED12S, OHDOX, OKS, OPA1, TNRC11, TRAP230, mediator complex subunit 12, Kto, HDKR
- External IDs: OMIM: 300188; MGI: 1926212; GeneCards: MED12

Gene location (Human)
| Chr. | X chromosome (human) |
| Band | Xq13.1 | Start | 71,118,543 bp |
| Band | Xq13.1 | End | 71,144,103 bp |

Gene location (Mouse)
| Chr. | X chromosome (mouse) |
| Band | X|X D | Start | 100,317,636 bp |
| Band | X|X D | End | 100,341,071 bp |
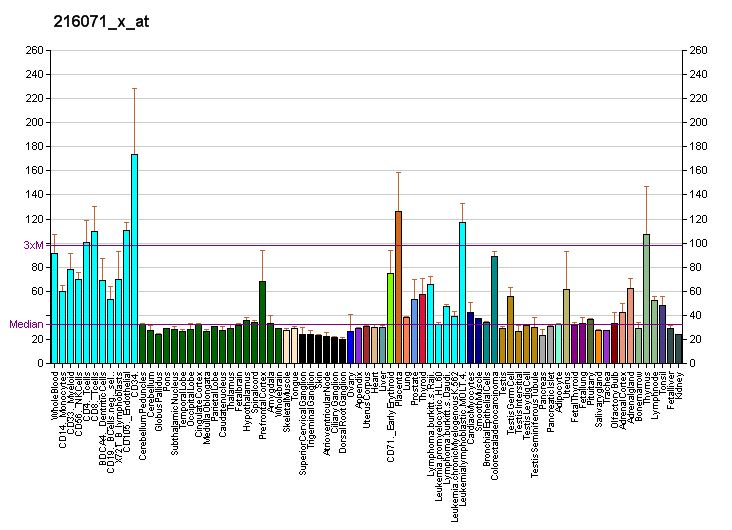

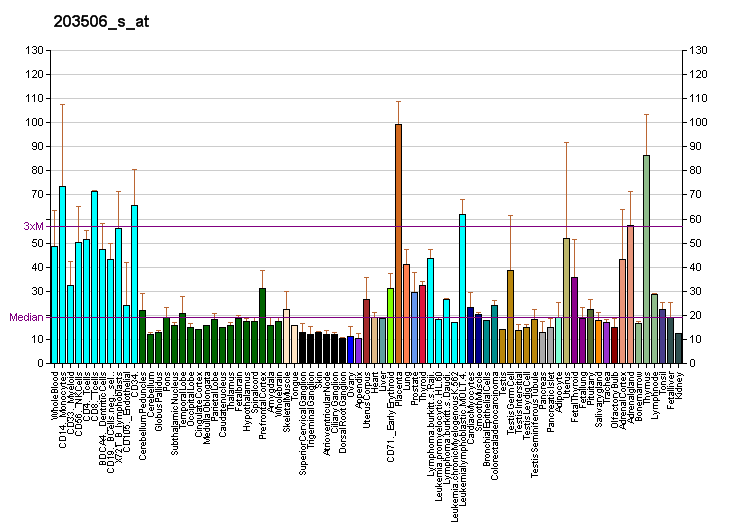

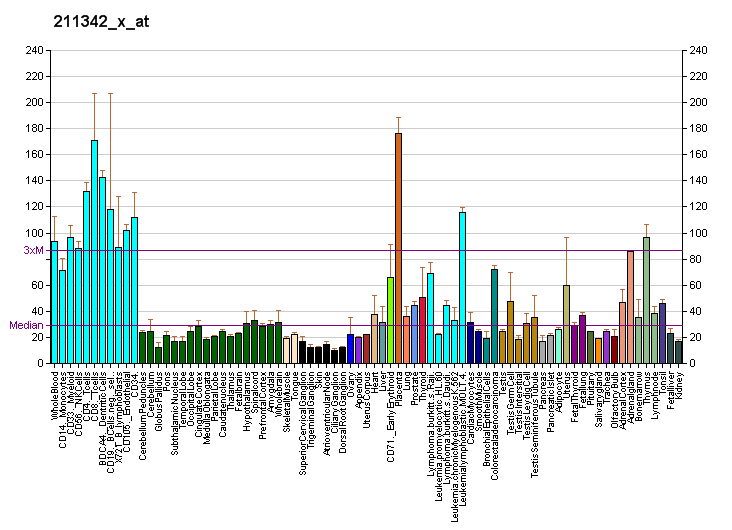
RNA expression pattern
| Bgee | Human / Mouse (ortholog); Top expressed in: right adrenal cortex; left ovary; right ovary; left adrenal gland; left adrenal cortex; body of uterus; right uterine tube; spleen; canal of the cervix; right lobe of thyroid gland / Top expressed in: bone marrow; tail of embryo; islet of Langerhans; spleen; genital tubercle; neural layer of retina; thymus; adrenal gland; cerebellar cortex; granulocyte; More reference expression data |
| BioGPS | More reference expression data |
Gene ontology
| Molecular function | RNA polymerase II cis-regulatory region sequence-specific DNA binding; transcription coactivator activity; beta-catenin binding; protein domain specific binding; ubiquitin protein ligase activity; transcription coregulator activity; transcription factor binding; chromatin binding; thyroid hormone receptor binding; protein C-terminus binding; protein binding; nuclear receptor coactivator activity; vitamin D receptor binding; signaling receptor activity |
| Cellular component | membrane; ubiquitin ligase complex; mediator complex; nucleus; nucleoplasm |
| Biological process | somitogenesis; androgen receptor signaling pathway; endoderm development; regulation of transcription, DNA-templated; embryonic organ development; embryonic neurocranium morphogenesis; axis elongation involved in somitogenesis; regulation of transcription by RNA polymerase II; Schwann cell development; negative regulation of Wnt signaling pathway; intracellular steroid hormone receptor signaling pathway; transcription, DNA-templated; stem cell population maintenance; positive regulation of transcription, DNA-templated; Wnt signaling pathway, planar cell polarity pathway; development of the heart; neural tube closure; embryonic brain development; protein ubiquitination; neural tube development; spinal cord development; post-anal tail morphogenesis; canonical Wnt signaling pathway; oligodendrocyte development; transcription initiation from RNA polymerase II promoter; positive regulation of transcription by RNA polymerase II |
Sources:Amigo / QuickGO
Orthologs
| Databases | NCBI: entry; OMA: entry |
| Species | Human | Mouse |
| Entrez | 9968 | 59024 |
| Ensembl | ENSG00000184634 | ENSMUSG00000079487 |
| UniProt | Q93074 | A2AGH6 |
| RefSeq (mRNA) | NM_005120 | NM_021521 |
| RefSeq (protein) | NP_005111 | NP_067496 |
| Location (UCSC) | Chr X: 71.12 – 71.14 Mb | Chr X: 100.32 – 100.34 Mb |
| PubMed search |
- Wikidata
| View/Edit Human | View/Edit Mouse |

Mediator of RNA polymerase II transcription, subunit 12 homolog (S. cerevisiae), also known as MED12, is a human gene found on the X chromosome.

== Clinical significance ==
Mutations in MED12 are responsible for at least two different forms of X-linked dominant Intellectual disability, Lujan-Fryns syndrome and FG syndrome, as well as instances of prostate cancer.

Mutations in MED12 are associated with uterine leiomyomas and breast fibroepithelial tumors (e.g. fibroadenoma and phyllodes tumors).

== Interactions ==
MED12 has been shown to interact with:

- Calcitriol receptor,
- Cyclin-dependent kinase 8
- Estrogen receptor alpha,
- Gli3, G9a, PPARGC1A,
- MED26,
- SOX9, and
- Thyroid hormone receptor alpha.
