= Klaus Patau =

American physician (1908–1975)

- Born: Klaus Pätau; 30 September 1908
- Died: 30 November 1975 (aged 67)
- Citizenship: German-born American
- Education: University of Berlin (Ph.D. 1936)
- Known for: Patau syndrome (trisomy 13)
- Spouse: Eeva Therman (1961-1975)
- Scientific career
- Fields: Clinical genetics
- Institutions: Kaiser Wilhelm Institute for Biology, University of Wisconsin–Madison
- Notable students: John M. Opitz

Klaus Patau (30 September 1908 – 30 November 1975; born Klaus Pätau; pronounced [ˈklaʊs ˈpɛtaʊ]) was a German-born American geneticist. He received his PhD from the University of Berlin in 1936, worked from 1938 to 1939 in London, and then returned to Germany, where he worked at the Kaiser Wilhelm Institute for Biology until 1947. He emigrated to the United States in 1948 and obtained American citizenship. In 1960 he first reported the extra chromosome in trisomy 13. The syndrome caused by trisomy 13 is often called Patau syndrome. It is also known as Bartholin-Patau syndrome, since the clinical picture associated with trisomy 13 was described by Thomas Bartholin in 1656. At the time, laboratory techniques were unable to distinguish between chromosomes of similar size, so chromosomes were grouped into seven groups by size, lettered A through G. Chromosomes 13 through 15 were in group D, so Patau originally named his eponymous syndrome "trisomy D".

Patau was in the Department of Genetics at the University of Wisconsin–Madison, as was his wife and collaborator, the Finnish cytogeneticist Eeva Therman (1916–2004). John M. Opitz completed his fellowship under Patau.

His son, Peter Hinrich Patau (1942—2017), was a journalist who contributed to several Wisconsin publications.
