= Cyclin-C =

Protein-coding gene in humans

CCNC

Identifiers
- Aliases: CCNC, CycC, cyclin C, hSRB11, SRB11
- External IDs: OMIM: 123838; MGI: 1858199; GeneCards: CCNC
Available structures
PDB	Ortholog search: PDBe RCSB
PDB	List of PDB id codes 3RGF, 4F6S, 4F6U, 4F6W, 4F70, 4F7J, 4F7L, 4F7N, 4F7S, 4G6L, 4CRL, 5HBE, 5HBH, 5BNJ, 5HBJ, 5FGK, 5CEI, 5HNB, 5HVY, 5I5Z

Gene location (Human)
Chr.	Chromosome 6 (human)
Band	6q16.2	Start	99,542,387 bp
Band	6q16.2	End	99,568,825 bp

Gene location (Mouse)
Chr.	Chromosome 4 (mouse)
Band	4|4 A3	Start	21,727,701 bp
Band	4|4 A3	End	21,759,922 bp
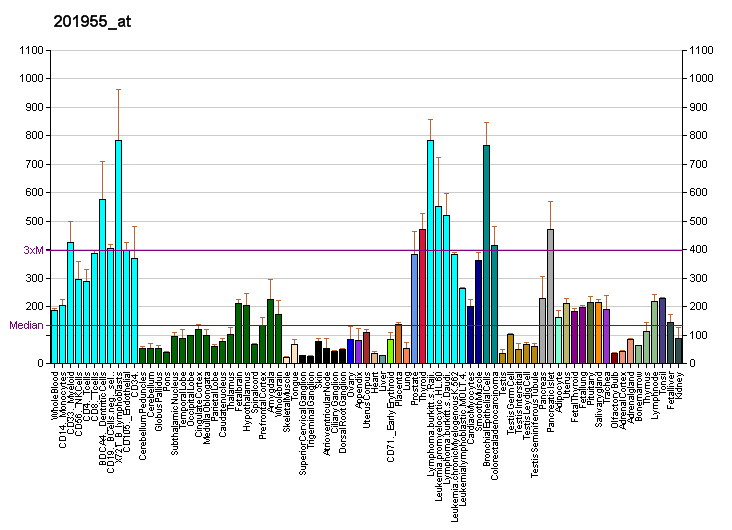
RNA expression pattern
Bgee	Human / Mouse (ortholog); Top expressed in: parotid gland; oral cavity; corpus epididymis; jejunal mucosa; islet of Langerhans; nasal epithelium; mucosa of sigmoid colon; skin of thigh; caput epididymis; amniotic fluid / Top expressed in: spermatid; spermatocyte; ventricular zone; right kidney; embryo; pineal gland; ventral tegmental area; medial vestibular nucleus; genital tubercle; dorsomedial hypothalamic nucleus; More reference expression data
BioGPS	More reference expression data
Gene ontology
Molecular function	protein binding; protein serine/threonine kinase activity; cyclin-dependent protein serine/threonine kinase regulator activity
Cellular component	mediator complex; cyclin-dependent protein kinase holoenzyme complex; nucleus; nucleoplasm
Biological process	positive regulation of phosphorylation of RNA polymerase II C-terminal domain; transcription initiation from RNA polymerase II promoter; regulation of transcription, DNA-templated; positive regulation of cyclin-dependent protein serine/threonine kinase activity; positive regulation of transcription by RNA polymerase II; protein phosphorylation; transcription, DNA-templated; regulation of cyclin-dependent protein serine/threonine kinase activity; regulation of transcription by RNA polymerase II; regulation of protein kinase activity
Sources:Amigo / QuickGO
Orthologs
Databases	NCBI: entry; OMA: entry
Species	Human	Mouse
Entrez	892	51813
Ensembl	ENSG00000112237	ENSMUSG00000028252
UniProt	P24863	Q62447
RefSeq (mRNA)	NM_001013399; NM_005190; NM_001363537	NM_001122982; NM_001290420; NM_001290422; NM_016746
RefSeq (protein)	NP_001013417; NP_005181; NP_001350466	NP_001116454; NP_001277349; NP_001277351; NP_058026
Location (UCSC)	Chr 6: 99.54 – 99.57 Mb	Chr 4: 21.73 – 21.76 Mb
PubMed search
- Wikidata
View/Edit Human	View/Edit Mouse

Cyclin-C is a protein that in humans is encoded by the CCNC gene.

The protein encoded by this gene is a member of the cyclin family of proteins. The encoded protein interacts with cyclin-dependent kinase 8 and induces the phosphorylation of the carboxy-terminal domain of the large subunit of RNA polymerase II. The level of mRNAs for this gene peaks in the G1 phase of the cell cycle. Two transcript variants encoding different isoforms have been found for this gene.

== Interactions ==
CCNC (gene) has been shown to interact with Estrogen receptor alpha and Cyclin-dependent kinase 8.
