= Mediator (coactivator) =

Multiprotein complex involved in transcription in eukaryotes

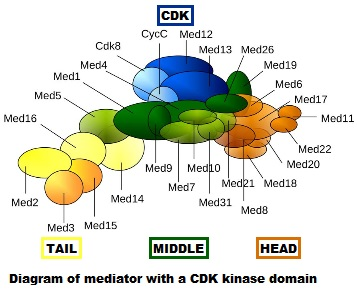
Figure 1: Diagram of Mediator with its cyclin-dependent kinase module attached

Mediator is a multiprotein complex that functions as a transcriptional coactivator in all eukaryotes. It was discovered in 1990 in the lab of Roger D. Kornberg, recipient of the 2006 Nobel Prize in Chemistry. Mediator (Note: Mediator is also referred to in scientific literature as the vitamin D receptor interacting protein (DRIP) coactivator complex and the thyroid hormone receptor-associated proteins (TRAP).) interacts with transcription factors and RNA polymerase II. It mainly functions to transmit signals from the transcription factors to the polymerase.

Mediator complexes are variable at the evolutionary, compositional and conformational levels. Figure 1 shows only one "snapshot" of what a particular complex might comprise, (Note: However note that more recently it has been found that the CDK module and MED26 cannot be present concurrently in a complex.) but it is an inaccurate depiction of the conformation in vivo. During evolution, Mediator has complexified. The yeast Saccharomyces cerevisiae (a simple eukaryote) is thought to have up to 21 subunits in the core Mediator (exclusive of the CDK module), while mammals have up to 26.

Individual subunits can be absent or replaced by other subunits under different conditions. Also, there are many intrinsically disordered regions in Mediator proteins, which may contribute to the conformational flexibility seen both with and without other bound proteins or protein complexes. A more realistic model of Mediator without the CDK module is shown in Figure 2.

Mediator is required for successful transcription of genes by RNA polymerase II, and contacts the polymerase in the transcription preinitiation complex. A recent model showing the polymerase associating with Mediator without DNA is shown in Figure 3. In addition to RNA polymerase II, Mediator must also associate with transcription factors and DNA; a model of such interactions is shown in Figure 4. Note that the different morphologies of Mediator do not necessarily mean that a particular model is correct; rather those differences may reflect the flexibility of Mediator as it interacts with other molecules. (Note: The sharp bend in the DNA associated with the transcription bubble is shown in the graphical abstract and first figure of this research paper) For example, after binding the enhancer and core promoter, the Mediator complex compositionally changes, dissociating the kinase module and associating with RNA polymerase II for transcriptional activation.

Mediator is located within the cell nucleus. It is required for successfully transcribing nearly all class II gene promoters in yeast. It works similarly in mammals. Mediator functions as a coactivator and binds to the C-terminal domain of RNA polymerase II holoenzyme, bridging this enzyme and transcription factors.

== Structure ==
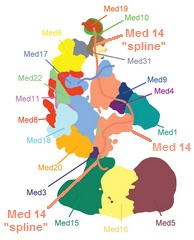
Figure 5: Mediator complex architecture with focus on the disordered "spline" of MED14

The yeast Mediator complex is approximately as massive as a small subunit of a eukaryotic ribosome. The yeast Mediator has 25 subunits, while the mammalian Mediator is slightly larger. Mediator comprises 4 main parts: the head, middle, tail, and the transiently associated CDK8 kinase module.

Mediator subunits have many intrinsically disordered regions called "splines", which may be important to allow the structural changes of Mediator that change the function of the complex. (Note: Some of those changes are diagrammed in figure 1 of the review article, which can be viewed in slightly larger form by clicking it at that site.) Figure 5 shows the splines of the MED14 subunit connecting a large portion of the complex together while still allowing flexibility. (Note: Note that Med 17 (shown in blue) also has that sort of spline)

Mediator complexes lacking a subunit have been found or produced. These smaller complexes can still function normally in some activity, but lack other capabilities. This indicates a somewhat independent function of some of the subunits while composing the larger complex.

Another example of structural variability is seen in vertebrates, in which 3 paralogues of subunits of the cyclin-dependent kinase (CDK) module have evolved by 3 independent gene duplication events followed by sequence divergence.

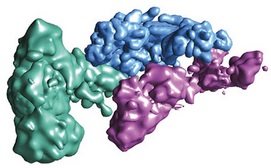
Figure 2: Mediator structural model

There is a report that Mediator stably associates with a particular type of non-coding RNA, ncRNA-a. (Note: These non-coding activating RNAs have not been mentioned yet in the ncRNA article as of 16 February 2017) These stable associations regulate gene expression in vivo, and are prevented by mutations in MED12 that produce the human disease FG syndrome. Thus, the structure of a Mediator complex can be augmented by RNA as well as proteinaceous transcription factors.

== Function ==
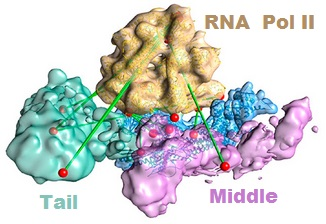
Figure 3: Structural model of Mediator's tail and middle bound to RNA polymerase II

Mediator was originally discovered because it was important for RNA polymerase II function, but it has many more functions than just interactions at the transcription start site.

=== RNA polymerase II–Mediator core initiation complex ===
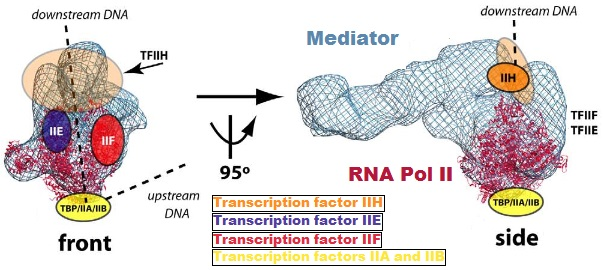
Figure 4: Model of Mediator with some transcription factors, Pol II and DNA

Mediator is a crucial component for transcription initiation. Mediator interacts with the pre-initiation complex, composed of RNA Polymerase II and general transcription factors TFIIB, TFIID, TFIIE, TFIIF, and TFIIH to stabilize and initiate transcription. Studies of Mediator–RNA Pol II contacts in budding yeast showed the importance of TFIIB-Mediator contacts in the formation of the complex. Interactions of Mediator with TFIID in the initiation complex has been shown.

The structure of a core Mediator (cMed) while associated with a core pre-initiation complex was elucidated.

=== RNA synthesis ===
The preinitiation complex, which contains Mediator, transcription factors, a nucleosome (Note: This is the +1 nucleosome, which "covers" the transcription start site during the preinitiation phase.) and RNA polymerase II, is important for positioning the polymerase for the start of transcription. Before RNA synthesis starts, the polymerase dissociates from Mediator. This is seemingly via phosphorylation of the polymerase by a kinase. Importantly, Mediator and transcription factors do not dissociate from the DNA when the polymerase begins transcription. Rather, the complex remains at the promoter to recruit another RNA polymerase to begin another round of transcription. (Note: This is diagrammed in figure 2 of the review article, which can be viewed in slightly larger form by clicking it at that site.)

There is some evidence to suggest that Mediator in Schizosaccharomyces pombe helps regulate RNA polymerase III (Pol III) transcripts of tRNAs. An independent report confirmed Mediator specifically associating with Pol III in Saccharomyces cerevisiae. Those authors also reported specific associations with RNA polymerase I and proteins involved in transcription elongation and RNA processing, supporting other evidence of Mediator's involvement in elongation and processing.

=== Chromatin organization ===
Mediator is involved in chromatin looping, which brings distant regions of a chromosome into closer physical proximity. The ncRNA-a mentioned above is involved in such looping. (Note: This is diagrammed in figure 3 of the review article, which can be viewed in slightly larger form by clicking it at that site. That figure also shows Pol II disengaged from mediator, etc, which remains on the DNA) Enhancer RNAs (eRNAs) can function similarly.

In addition to euchromatin looping, Mediator helps form or maintain heterochromatin at centromeres and telomeres.

=== Signal transduction ===
TGFβ signaling at the cell membrane involves two different intracellular pathways. Only one depends on MED15. (Note: Also known as ARC105 in Xenopus laevis, the model species in which the work was done.) In both human cells and Caenorhabditis elegans, MED15 helps lipid homeostasis through the SREBP-containing pathway. In the model plant Arabidopsis thaliana, the ortholog of MED15 is required for signaling by the plant hormone salicylic acid, while MED25 is required for the transcriptional activation of responses to hypoxia, jasmonate and shade signalling. Two components of the CDK module (MED12 and MED13) are involved in the Wnt signaling pathway. MED23 is involved in the RAS/MAPK/ERK pathway. This abbreviated review shows the versatility of individual Mediator subunits, and leads to the idea that Mediator is an end-point of signaling pathways.

=== Human disease ===
Involvement of Mediator in various human diseases has been reviewed. Since inhibiting one interaction of a disease-causing signaling pathway with a subunit of Mediator may not inhibit general transcription needed for normal function, Mediator subunits are attractive candidates for therapeutic drugs.

== Interactions ==
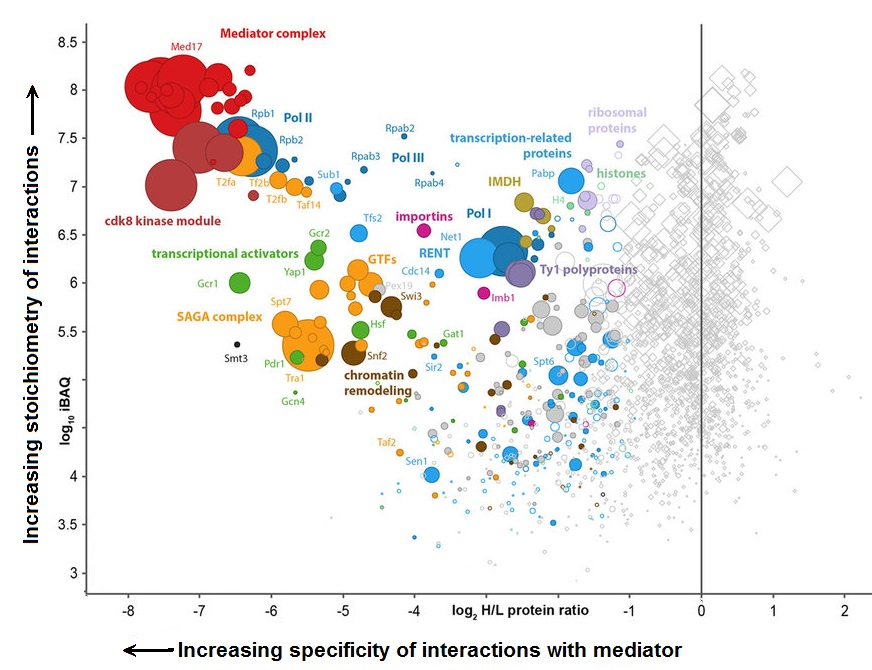
Mediator interactome in Saccharomyces cerevisiae

Very gentle cell lysis in yeast followed by co-immunoprecipitation with an antibody to a MED17 has confirmed almost all previously reported or predicted interactions and revealed many previously unsuspected specific interactions of various proteins with Mediator.

== MED1 ==
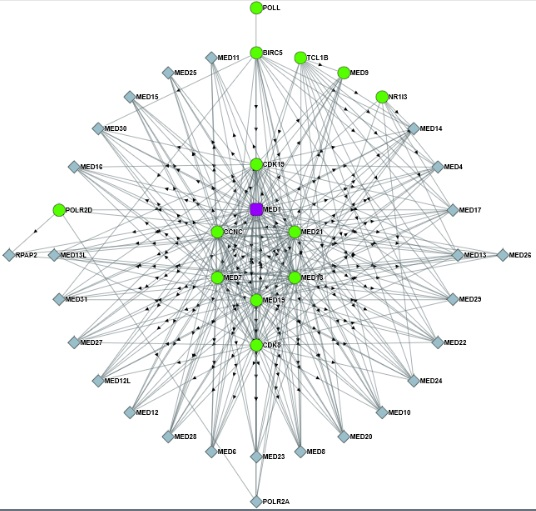
The interaction network of MED1 protein from BioPlex 2.0

Details of the first subunit are illustrative of the types of information that may be gathered for other subunits. See § Subunit composition for them.

=== Regulation by MicroRNAs ===
MicroRNAs help regulate the expression of many proteins. MED1 is targeted by miR-1, which is important in gene regulation in cancers. The tumor suppressor miR-137 also regulates MED1.

=== Mouse embryonic development ===
Null mutants die early (embryonic day 11.5). Investigating hypomorphic mutants (which survive 2 days longer) found that placental defects were primarily lethal and that there were also defects in cardiac and hepatic development, but many other organs were normal.

=== Mouse cells and tissues ===
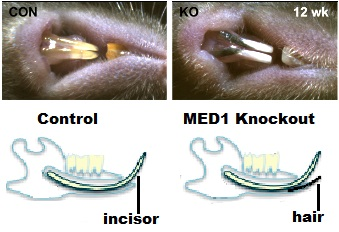
A Mediator mutation causes hairy teeth in mice

In mice, conditional mutations can be produced to affect only specific cells or tissues at specific times, so that the mouse can develop to adulthood to have its adult phenotype studied. In one case, MED1 was found to participate in controlling the timing of events of meiosis in male mice. Conditional mutants in keratinocytes differ in skin wound healing. A conditional mutation in mice changed dental epithelium into epidermal epithelium, which caused hair to grow beside the incisors.

== Subunit composition ==
The Mediator complex is composed of at least 31 subunits in all eukaryotes studied: MED1, MED4, MED6, MED7, MED8, MED9, MED10, MED11, MED12, MED13, MED13L, MED14, MED15, MED16, MED17, MED18, MED19, MED20, MED21, MED22, MED23, MED24, MED25, MED26, MED27, MED28, MED29, MED30, MED31, CCNC, and CDK8. There are three fungal-specific components, referred to as MED2, MED3 and MED5.

The subunits form at least three structurally distinct submodules. The head and the middle modules interact directly with RNA polymerase II, whereas the elongated tail module interacts with gene-specific regulatory proteins. Mediator containing the CDK8 module is less active than Mediator lacking this module in supporting transcriptional activation.

- The head module contains: MED6, MED8, MED11, SRB4/MED17, SRB5/MED18, ROX3/MED19, SRB2/MED20 and SRB6/MED22.
- The middle module contains: MED1, MED4, NUT1/MED5, MED7, CSE2/MED9, NUT2/MED10, SRB7/MED21 and SOH1/MED31. CSE2/MED9 interacts directly with MED4.
- The tail module contains: MED2, PGD1/MED3, RGR1/MED14, GAL11/MED15 and SIN4/MED16.
- The CDK8 module contains: MED12, MED13, CCNC and CDK8. Individual preparations of the Mediator complex lacking one or more distinct subunits have been variously termed ARC, CRSP, DRIP, PC2, SMCC and TRAP.

== In other species ==
Below is a cross-species comparison of Mediator complex subunits.

Subunit No.	Human gene	C. elegans gene	D. melanogaster gene	S. cerevisiae gene	Sch. pombe gene
MED1	MED1	Sop3/mdt-1.1, 1.2	MED1	MED1	med1
MED2 (Note: Fungal-specific)				MED2	
MED3				PGD1	
MED4	MED4		MED4	MED4	med4
MED5				NUT1	
MED6	MED6	MDT-6	MED6	MED6	med6
MED7	MED7	MDT-7/let-49	MED7	MED7	med7
MED8	MED8	MDT-8	MED8	MED8	med8
MED9	MED9		MED9	CSE2	
MED10	MED10	MDT-10		NUT2	med10
MED11	MED11	MDT-11	MED11	MED11	med11
MED12	MED12	MDT-12/dpy-22	MED12	SRB8	srb8
MED12L	MED12L				
MED13	MED13	MDT-13/let-19	MED13	SSN2	srb9
MED14	MED14	MDT-14/rgr-1	MED14	RGR1	med14
MED15	MED15	mdt-15	MED15	GAL11	YN91_SCHPO (Note: Protein-name in Sch. pombe)
MED16	MED16		MED16	SIN4	
MED17	MED17	MDT-17	MED17	SRB4	med17
MED18	MED18	MDT-18	MED18	SRB5	med18
MED19	MED19	MDT-19	MED19	ROX3	med19
MED20	MED20	MDT-20	MED20	SRB2	med20
MED21	MED21	MDT-21	MED21	SRB7	med21
MED22	MED22	MDT-22	MED22	SRB6	med22
MED23	MED23	MDT-23/sur-2	MED23		
MED24	MED24		MED24		
MED25	MED25		MED25		
MED26	MED26		MED26		
MED27	MED27		MED27		med27
MED28	MED28		MED28		
MED29	MED29	MDT-19	MED29		
MED30	MED30		MED30		
MED31	MED31	MDT-31	MED31	SOH1	med31
CCNC	CCNC	cic-1	CycC	SSN8	pch1
CDK8	CDK8	cdk-8	Cdk8	SSN3	srb10
