= MED29 =

Identifiers
- Aliases: MED29, IXL, MED2, mediator complex subunit 29
- External IDs: OMIM: 612914; MGI: 1914474; GeneCards: MED29

Gene location (Human)
Chr.	Chromosome 19 (human)
Band	19q13.2	Start	39,391,303 bp
Band	19q13.2	End	39,400,641 bp

Gene location (Mouse)
Chr.	Chromosome 7 (mouse)
Band	7|7 A3	Start	28,085,571 bp
Band	7|7 A3	End	28,092,133 bp
RNA expression pattern
Bgee	Human / Mouse (ortholog); Top expressed in: prefrontal cortex; amygdala; cingulate gyrus; anterior cingulate cortex; putamen; nucleus accumbens; caudate nucleus; hypothalamus; C1 segment; muscle of thigh / Top expressed in: interventricular septum; lumbar spinal ganglion; morula; yolk sac; seminiferous tubule; embryo; embryo; right kidney; otic placode; epiblast; More reference expression data
BioGPS	n/a
Gene ontology
Molecular function	protein binding
Cellular component	mediator complex; nucleus; nucleoplasm
Biological process	regulation of transcription, DNA-templated; transcription, DNA-templated
Sources:Amigo / QuickGO
Orthologs
Databases	NCBI: entry; OMA: entry
Species	Human	Mouse
Entrez	55588	67224
Ensembl	ENSG00000063322	ENSMUSG00000003444
UniProt	Q9NX70	Q9DB91
RefSeq (mRNA)	NM_017592; NM_001317770	NM_026042
RefSeq (protein)	NP_001304699; NP_060062	NP_080318
Location (UCSC)	Chr 19: 39.39 – 39.4 Mb	Chr 7: 28.09 – 28.09 Mb
PubMed search
- Wikidata
View/Edit Human	View/Edit Mouse

Mediator of RNA polymerase II transcription subunit 29 (Med29) is a transcription suppressor that in humans is encoded by the MED29 gene. It represents subunit MED29 of the Mediator complex.

Med29, along with Med11 and Med28 in mammals, is part of the core head-region of the Mediator complex. Med29 is the apparent orthologue of the Drosophila melanogaster Intersex protein (IXL), which interacts directly with, and functions as a transcriptional coactivator for, the DNA-binding transcription factor Doublesex, so it is likely that mammalian Med29 serves as a target for one or more DNA-binding transcriptional activators.

== See also ==
- Mediator
