= MED6 =

Protein-coding gene in the species Homo sapiens

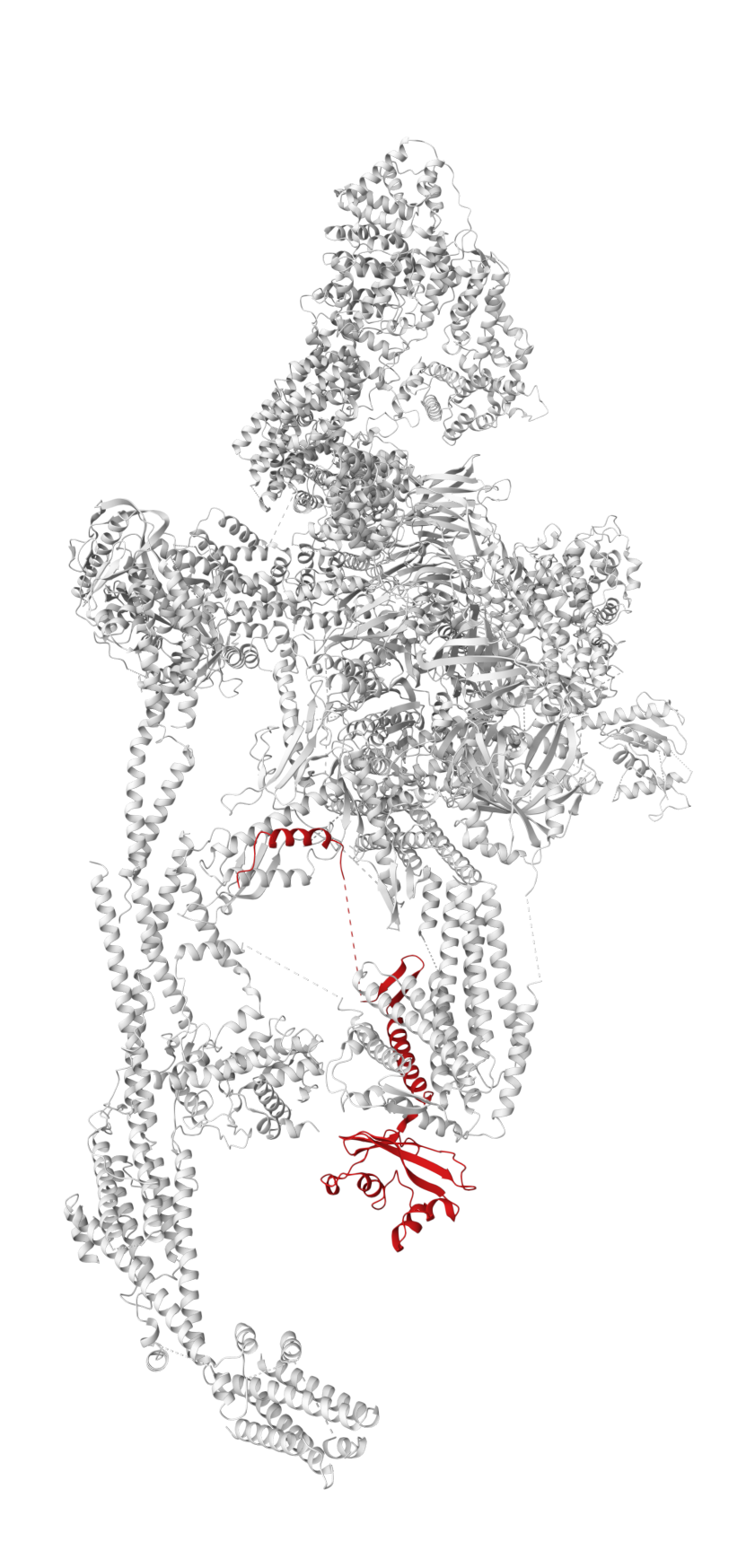

Identifiers
- Aliases: MED6, ARC33, NY-REN-28, mediator complex subunit 6
- External IDs: OMIM: 602984; MGI: 1917042; GeneCards: MED6

Gene location (Human)
Chr.	Chromosome 14 (human)
Band	14q24.2	Start	70,581,257 bp
Band	14q24.2	End	70,600,690 bp

Gene location (Mouse)
Chr.	Chromosome 12 (mouse)
Band	12|12 D1	Start	81,620,331 bp
Band	12|12 D1	End	81,641,782 bp
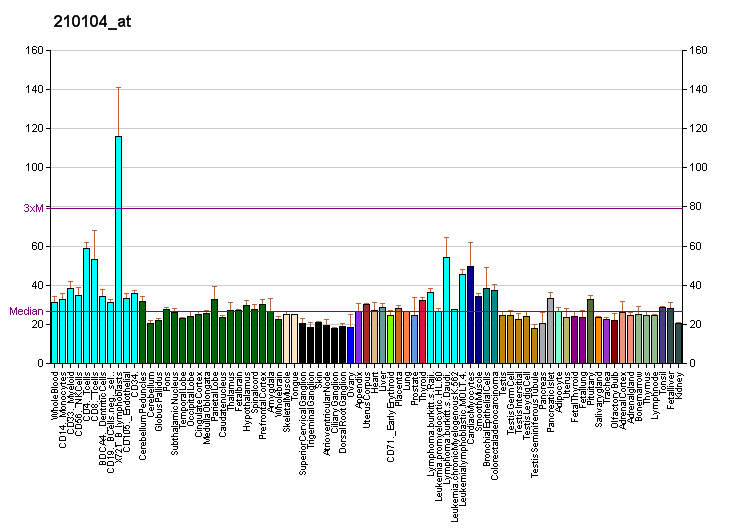

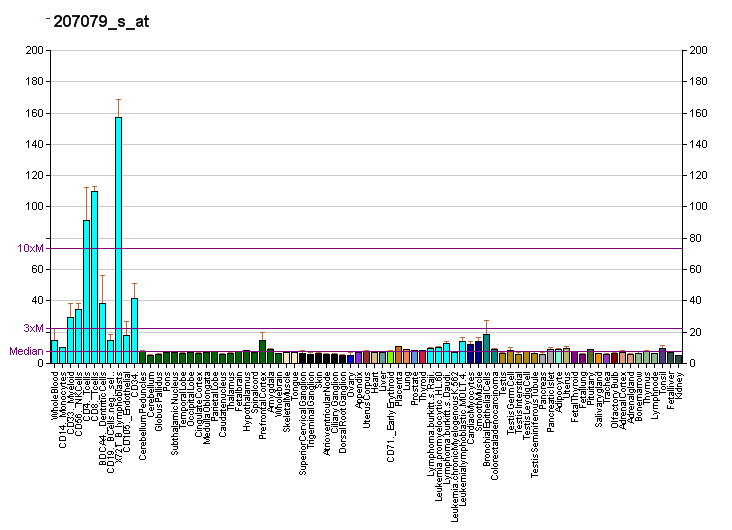
RNA expression pattern
Bgee	Human / Mouse (ortholog); Top expressed in: Achilles tendon; testicle; islet of Langerhans; monocyte; skin of leg; skin of abdomen; ganglionic eminence; muscle of thigh; gastrocnemius muscle; rectum / Top expressed in: zygote; genital tubercle; tail of embryo; yolk sac; morula; neural layer of retina; interventricular septum; maxillary prominence; mandibular prominence; epiblast; More reference expression data
BioGPS	More reference expression data
Gene ontology
Molecular function	transcription coactivator activity; transcription coregulator activity; transcription factor binding; protein binding
Cellular component	mediator complex; core mediator complex; membrane; nucleus; nucleoplasm
Biological process	regulation of transcription by RNA polymerase II; RNA polymerase II preinitiation complex assembly; transcription initiation from RNA polymerase II promoter; regulation of transcription, DNA-templated; positive regulation of transcription by RNA polymerase II; transcription, DNA-templated
Sources:Amigo / QuickGO
Orthologs
Databases	NCBI: entry; OMA: entry
Species	Human	Mouse
Entrez	10001	69792
Ensembl	ENSG00000133997	ENSMUSG00000002679
UniProt	O75586	Q921D4
RefSeq (mRNA)	NM_005466; NM_001284209; NM_001284210; NM_001284211	NM_027213; NM_001347384; NM_001347385; NM_001347386
RefSeq (protein)	NP_001271138; NP_001271139; NP_001271140; NP_005457	NP_001334313; NP_001334314; NP_001334315
Location (UCSC)	Chr 14: 70.58 – 70.6 Mb	Chr 12: 81.62 – 81.64 Mb
PubMed search
- Wikidata
View/Edit Human	View/Edit Mouse

Med6

Identifiers
- Symbol: Med6
- Pfam: PF04934
- InterPro: IPR007018
Available protein structures:
- PDB: IPR007018 PF04934 (ECOD; PDBsum)
- AlphaFold: IPR007018; PF04934

Mediator of RNA polymerase II transcription subunit 6 is one of the subunits of the Mediator complex. It is an enzyme that in humans is encoded by the MED6 gene.

== Protein family ==
This family of proteins represent the transcriptional mediator protein subunit 6 that is required for activation of many RNA polymerase II promoters and which are conserved from yeast to humans.

== Interactions ==
MED6 has been shown to interact with:

- Cyclin-dependent kinase 8,
- Estrogen receptor alpha,
- MED21, and
- Thyroid hormone receptor alpha.
