= MED10 =

Protein-coding gene in the species Homo sapiens

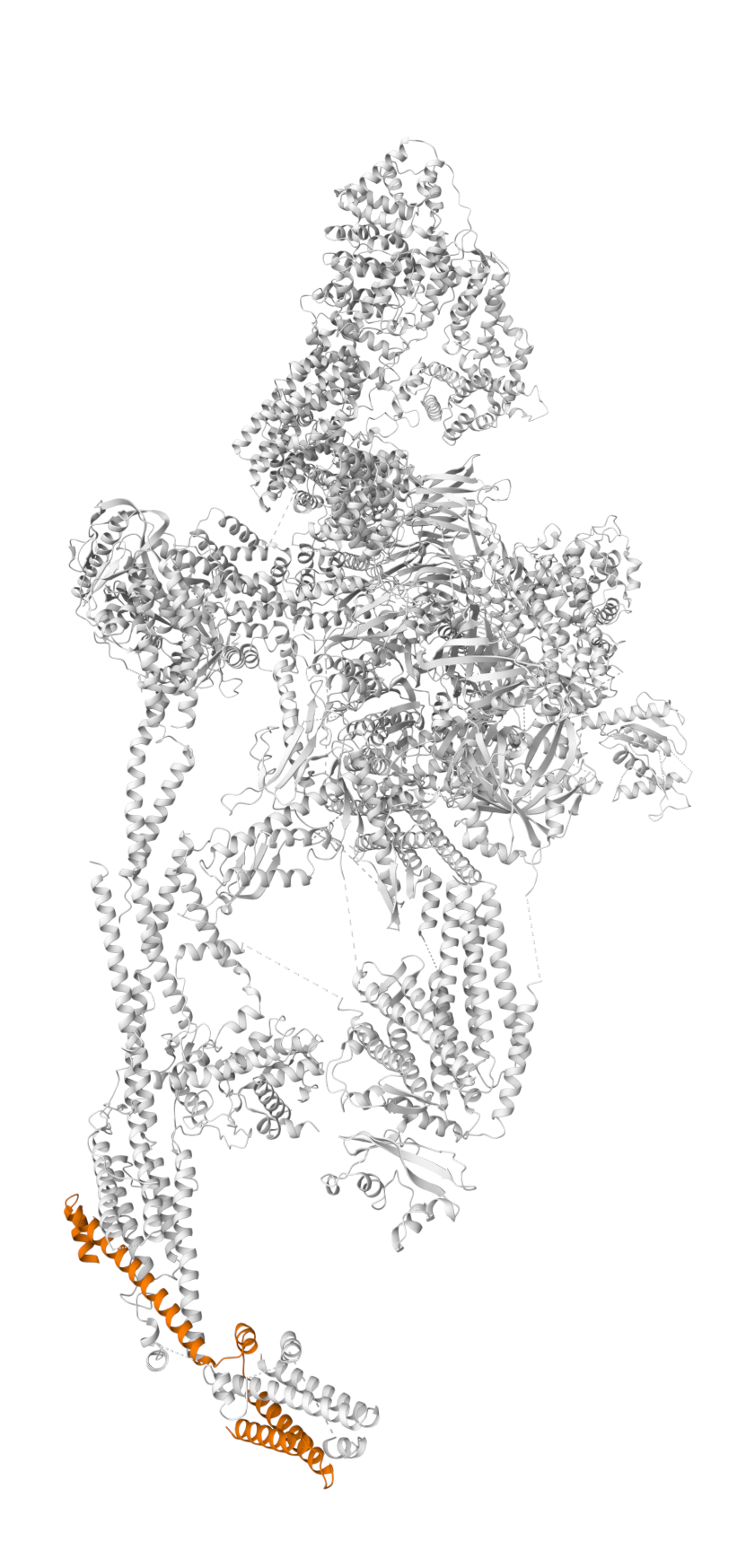

Identifiers
- Aliases: MED10, NUT2, TRG20, L6, mediator complex subunit 10
- External IDs: OMIM: 612382; MGI: 106331; GeneCards: MED10

Gene location (Human)
Chr.	Chromosome 5 (human)
Band	5p15.31	Start	6,371,874 bp
Band	5p15.31	End	6,378,571 bp

Gene location (Mouse)
Chr.	Chromosome 13 (mouse)
Band	13 C1|13 35.55 cM	Start	69,950,514 bp
Band	13 C1|13 35.55 cM	End	69,964,223 bp
RNA expression pattern
Bgee	Human / Mouse (ortholog); Top expressed in: monocyte; Brodmann area 9; muscle layer of sigmoid colon; prefrontal cortex; tibial arteries; oocyte; cingulate gyrus; anterior cingulate cortex; C1 segment; thoracic aorta / Top expressed in: seminiferous tubule; morula; morula; facial motor nucleus; neural tube; ovary; gastrula; zygote; medial ganglionic eminence; otic placode; More reference expression data
BioGPS	n/a
Gene ontology
Molecular function	protein binding; ubiquitin protein ligase activity; transcription coregulator activity
Cellular component	nucleoplasm; mediator complex; ubiquitin ligase complex; nucleus; core mediator complex
Biological process	positive regulation of transcription by RNA polymerase II; protein ubiquitination; transcription initiation from RNA polymerase II promoter; stem cell population maintenance; regulation of transcription, DNA-templated; regulation of transcription by RNA polymerase II; transcription, DNA-templated
Sources:Amigo / QuickGO
Orthologs
Databases	NCBI: entry; OMA: entry
Species	Human	Mouse
Entrez	84246	28077
Ensembl	ENSG00000133398	ENSMUSG00000021598
UniProt	Q9BTT4	Q9CXU0
RefSeq (mRNA)	NM_032286	NM_138596; NM_001378925
RefSeq (protein)	NP_115662	NP_613062; NP_001365854
Location (UCSC)	Chr 5: 6.37 – 6.38 Mb	Chr 13: 69.95 – 69.96 Mb
PubMed search
- Wikidata
View/Edit Human	View/Edit Mouse

Mediator complex subunit 10 (Med10) is a protein that in humans is encoded by the MED10 gene.

== Function ==
Med10 is a component of the Mediator complex, which is a coactivator for DNA-binding factors that activate transcription via RNA polymerase II.[supplied by OMIM, Oct 2008].

== See also ==
- Mediator
