= MED31 =

Protein-coding gene in the species Homo sapiens

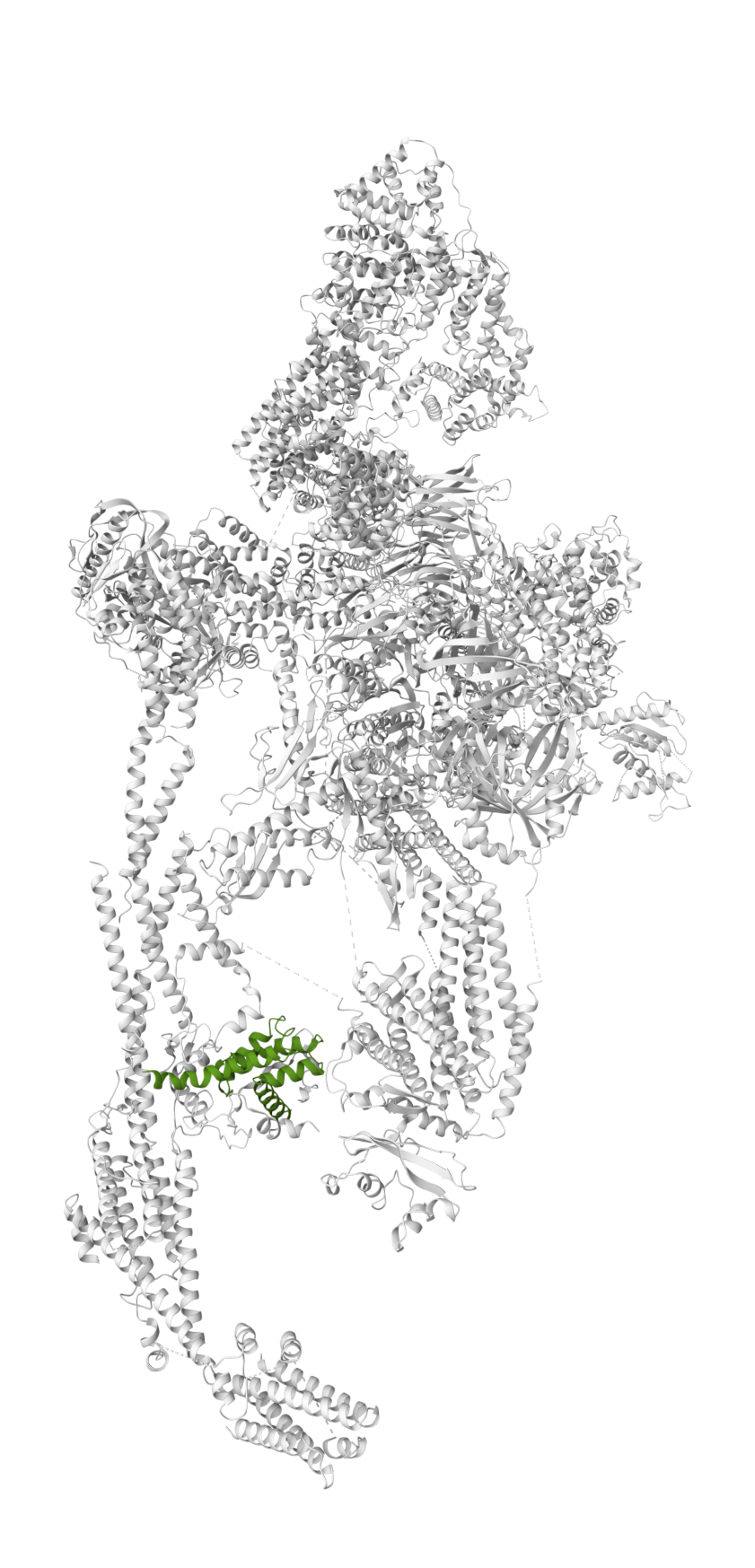

Identifiers
- Aliases: MED31, 3110004H13Rik, Soh1, CGI-125, mediator complex subunit 31
- External IDs: MGI: 1914529; GeneCards: MED31

Gene location (Human)
Chr.	Chromosome 17 (human)
Band	17p13.1	Start	6,643,311 bp
Band	17p13.1	End	6,651,634 bp

Gene location (Mouse)
Chr.	Chromosome 11 (mouse)
Band	11|11 B4	Start	72,102,550 bp
Band	11|11 B4	End	72,106,418 bp
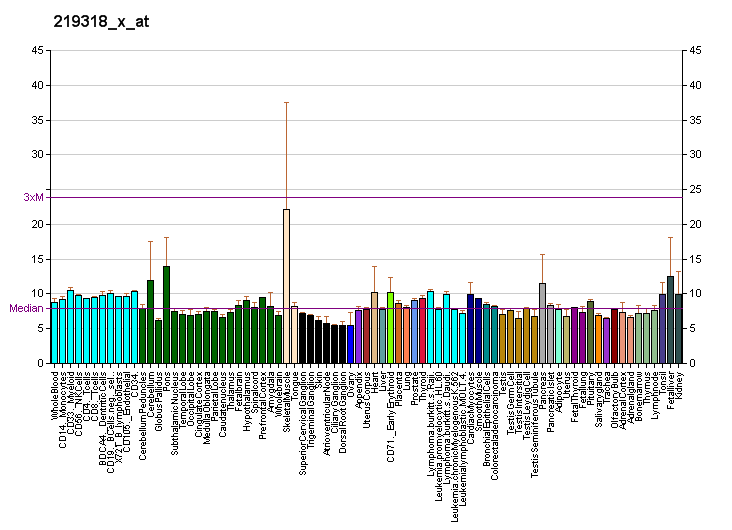
RNA expression pattern
Bgee	Human / Mouse (ortholog); Top expressed in: buccal mucosa cell; bronchial epithelial cell; anterior pituitary; sperm; testicle; islet of Langerhans; prefrontal cortex; right adrenal gland; right adrenal cortex; nucleus accumbens / Top expressed in: endocardial cushion; zygote; medial ganglionic eminence; facial motor nucleus; interventricular septum; secondary oocyte; atrioventricular valve; olfactory epithelium; morula; right lung lobe; More reference expression data
BioGPS	More reference expression data
Gene ontology
Molecular function	transcription coactivator activity; transcription coregulator activity; protein binding; ubiquitin protein ligase activity
Cellular component	core mediator complex; nucleus; nucleoplasm; ubiquitin ligase complex; mediator complex
Biological process	regulation of transcription by RNA polymerase II; limb development; transcription initiation from RNA polymerase II promoter; regulation of transcription, DNA-templated; negative regulation of fibroblast proliferation; protein ubiquitination; transcription, DNA-templated; positive regulation of nucleic acid-templated transcription
Sources:Amigo / QuickGO
Orthologs
Databases	NCBI: entry; OMA: entry
Species	Human	Mouse
Entrez	51003	67279
Ensembl	ENSG00000108590	ENSMUSG00000020801
UniProt	Q9Y3C7	Q9CXU1
RefSeq (mRNA)	NM_016060	NM_026068
RefSeq (protein)	NP_057144	NP_080344
Location (UCSC)	Chr 17: 6.64 – 6.65 Mb	Chr 11: 72.1 – 72.11 Mb
PubMed search
- Wikidata
View/Edit Human	View/Edit Mouse

Med31

Identifiers
- Symbol: Med31
- Pfam: PF05669
- InterPro: IPR008831
Available protein structures:
- PDB: IPR008831 PF05669 (ECOD; PDBsum)
- AlphaFold: IPR008831; PF05669

Mediator of RNA polymerase II transcription subunit 31 is a protein in humans encoded by the MED31 gene. It represents subunit Med31 of the Mediator complex. The family contains the Saccharomyces cerevisiae SOH1 homologues. SOH1 is responsible for the repression of temperature sensitive growth of the HPR1 mutant and has been found to be a component of the RNA polymerase II transcription complex. SOH1 not only interacts with factors involved in DNA repair, but transcription as well. Thus, the SOH1 protein may serve to couple these two processes.
