= MED18 =

Protein-coding gene in humans

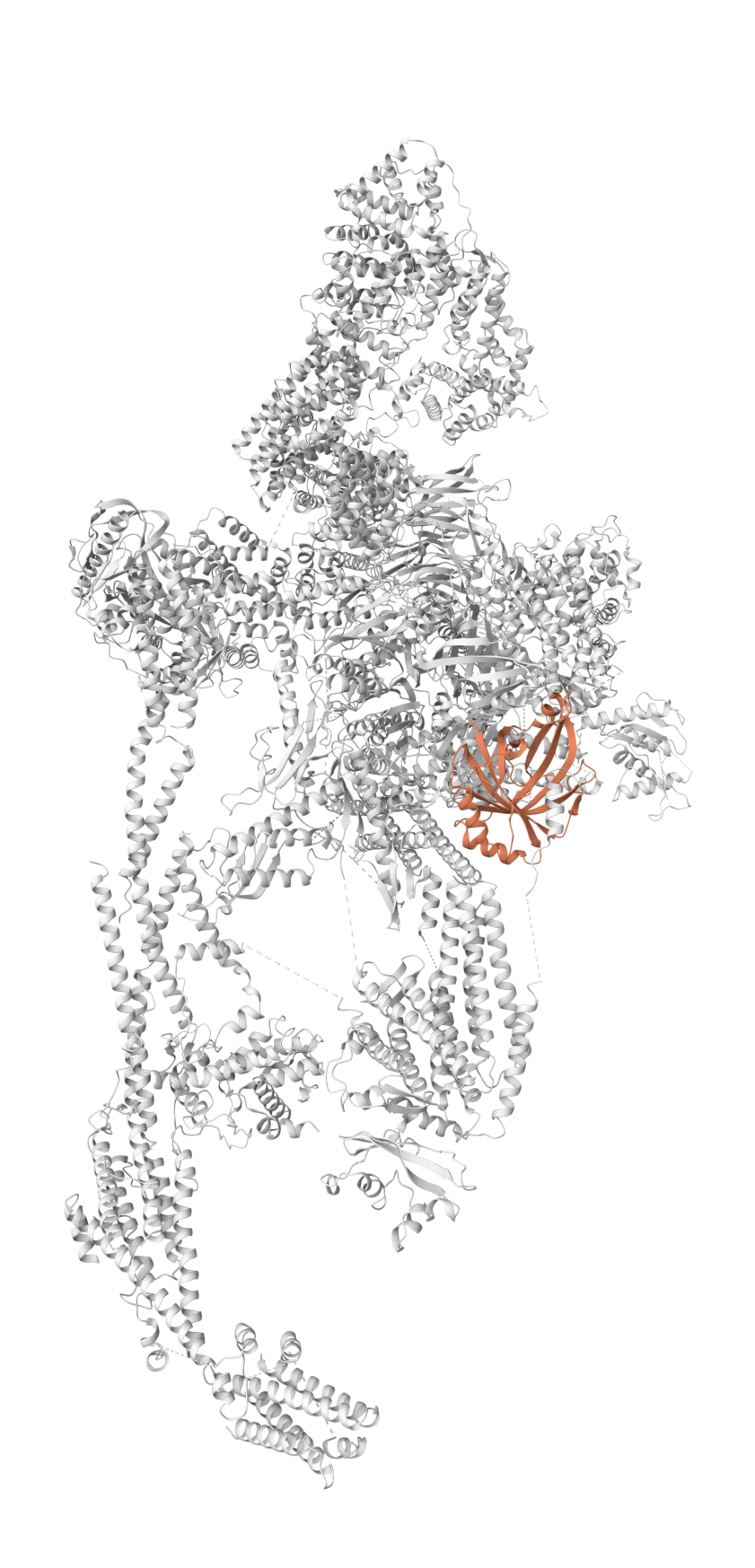

Identifiers
- Aliases: MED18, p28b, mediator complex subunit 18, SRB5
- External IDs: OMIM: 612384; MGI: 1914469; GeneCards: MED18

Gene location (Human)
Chr.	Chromosome 1 (human)
Band	1p35.3	Start	28,329,002 bp
Band	1p35.3	End	28,335,965 bp

Gene location (Mouse)
Chr.	Chromosome 4 (mouse)
Band	4|4 D2.3	Start	132,186,042 bp
Band	4|4 D2.3	End	132,191,232 bp
RNA expression pattern
Bgee	Human / Mouse (ortholog); Top expressed in: mucosa of transverse colon; islet of Langerhans; stromal cell of endometrium; lymph node; blood; rectum; granulocyte; skeletal muscle tissue; duodenum; appendix / Top expressed in: Region I of hippocampus proper; hand; maxillary prominence; mandibular prominence; globus pallidus; intercostal muscle; internal carotid artery; parotid gland; external carotid artery; mesenteric lymph nodes; More reference expression data
BioGPS	n/a
Gene ontology
Molecular function	transcription coregulator activity; protein binding; ubiquitin protein ligase activity
Cellular component	core mediator complex; mediator complex; nucleus; ubiquitin ligase complex
Biological process	regulation of transcription by RNA polymerase II; termination of RNA polymerase II transcription; regulation of transcription, DNA-templated; transcription, DNA-templated; protein ubiquitination
Sources:Amigo / QuickGO
Orthologs
Databases	NCBI: entry; OMA: entry
Species	Human	Mouse
Entrez	54797	67219
Ensembl	ENSG00000130772; ENSG00000284944	ENSMUSG00000066042
UniProt	Q9BUE0	Q9CZ82
RefSeq (mRNA)	NM_001127350; NM_017638	NM_026039
RefSeq (protein)	NP_001120822; NP_060108	NP_080315
Location (UCSC)	Chr 1: 28.33 – 28.34 Mb	Chr 4: 132.19 – 132.19 Mb
PubMed search
- Wikidata
View/Edit Human	View/Edit Mouse

Mediator complex subunit 18 (Med18) is a protein that in humans is encoded by the MED18 gene.

== Function ==
Med18 is a component of the Mediator complex, which is a coactivator for DNA-binding factors that activate transcription via RNA polymerase II.

== See also ==
- Mediator
