= MED30 =

Protein-coding gene in the species Homo sapiens

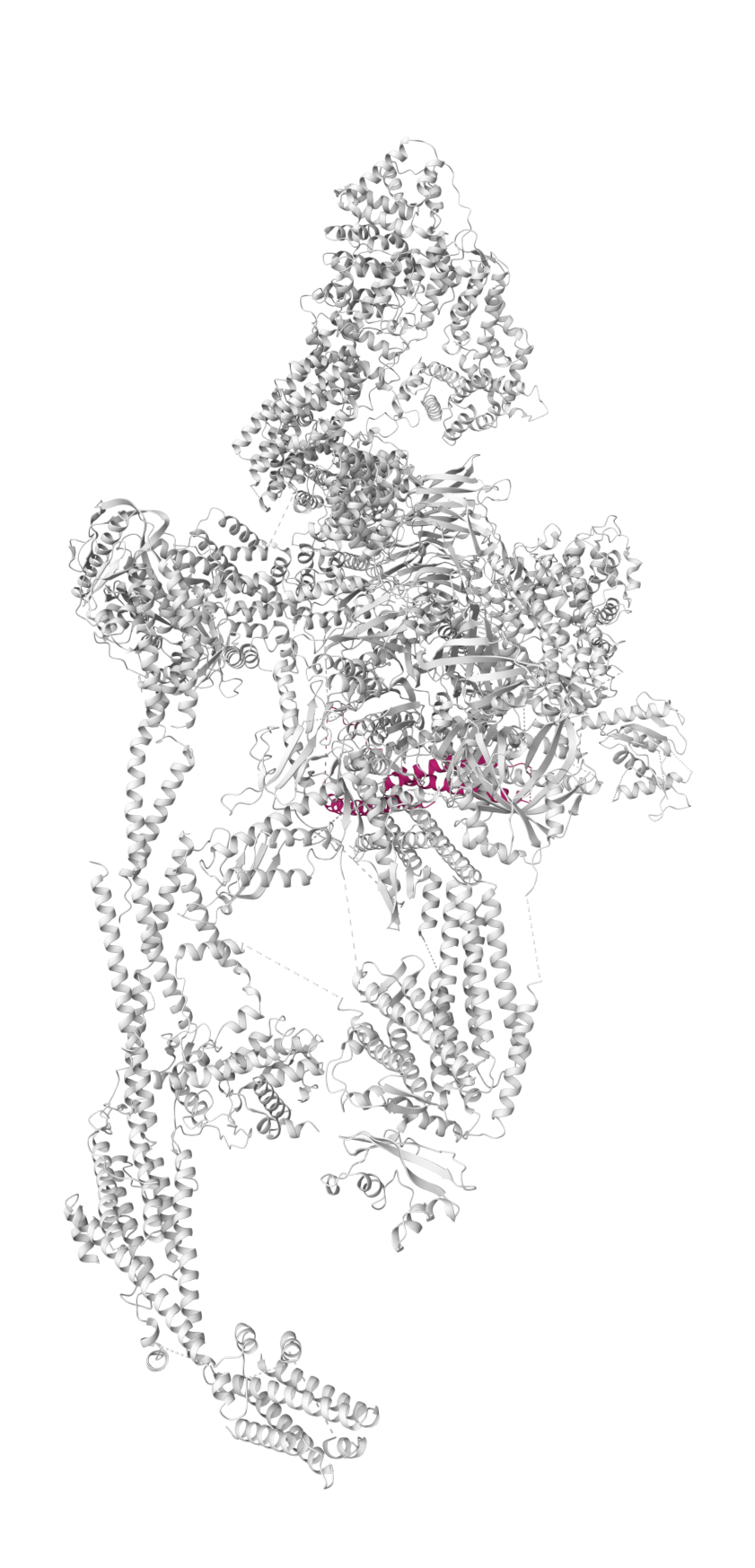

Identifiers
- Aliases: MED30, MED30S, THRAP6, TRAP25, mediator complex subunit 30
- External IDs: OMIM: 610237; MGI: 1917040; GeneCards: MED30

Gene location (Human)
Chr.	Chromosome 8 (human)
Band	8q24.11	Start	117,520,713 bp
Band	8q24.11	End	117,540,262 bp

Gene location (Mouse)
Chr.	Chromosome 15 (mouse)
Band	15|15 C	Start	52,575,804 bp
Band	15|15 C	End	52,593,960 bp
RNA expression pattern
Bgee	Human / Mouse (ortholog); Top expressed in: oocyte; secondary oocyte; bone marrow; monocyte; ganglionic eminence; sperm; testicle; cartilage tissue; Achilles tendon; left ovary / Top expressed in: medial ganglionic eminence; zygote; interventricular septum; endocardial cushion; secondary oocyte; primary oocyte; granulocyte; atrioventricular valve; thymus; lens; More reference expression data
BioGPS	n/a
Gene ontology
Molecular function	transcription coregulator activity; vitamin D receptor binding; thyroid hormone receptor binding; nuclear receptor coactivator activity; ubiquitin protein ligase activity; protein binding; signaling receptor activity
Cellular component	nucleoplasm; nucleus; mediator complex; ubiquitin ligase complex
Biological process	transcription, DNA-templated; androgen receptor signaling pathway; stem cell population maintenance; intracellular steroid hormone receptor signaling pathway; positive regulation of transcription, DNA-templated; protein ubiquitination; regulation of transcription, DNA-templated; transcription initiation from RNA polymerase II promoter; regulation of transcription by RNA polymerase II
Sources:Amigo / QuickGO
Orthologs
Databases	NCBI: entry; OMA: entry
Species	Human	Mouse
Entrez	90390	69790
Ensembl	ENSG00000164758	ENSMUSG00000038622
UniProt	Q96HR3	Q9CQI9
RefSeq (mRNA)	NM_001282986; NM_080651; NM_001363182	NM_027212
RefSeq (protein)	NP_001269915; NP_542382; NP_001350111	NP_081488
Location (UCSC)	Chr 8: 117.52 – 117.54 Mb	Chr 15: 52.58 – 52.59 Mb
PubMed search
- Wikidata
View/Edit Human	View/Edit Mouse

Med30

Identifiers
- Symbol: Med30
- Pfam: PF11315
- InterPro: IPR021019
Available protein structures:
- PDB: IPR021019 PF11315 (ECOD; PDBsum)
- AlphaFold: IPR021019; PF11315

Mediator of RNA polymerase II transcription subunit 30 is an enzyme that in humans is encoded by the MED30 gene. It represents subunit Med30 of the Mediator complex and is metazoan-specific, having no homologues in yeasts.

== Interactions ==
MED30 has been shown to interact with MED22.
