= MED4 =

Protein-coding gene in the species Homo sapiens

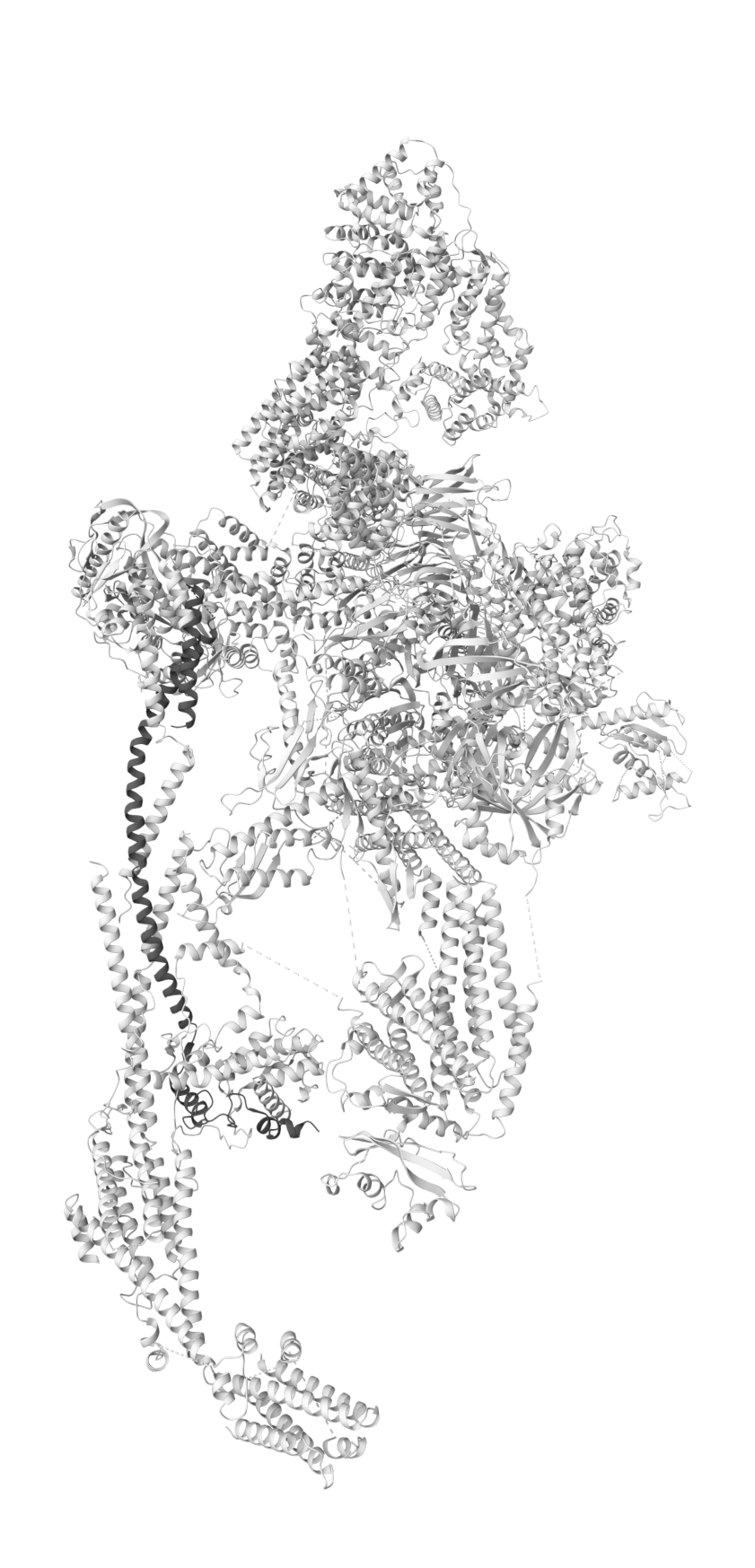

Identifiers
- Aliases: MED4, ARC36, DRIP36, HSPC126, TRAP36, VDRIP, mediator complex subunit 4
- External IDs: OMIM: 605718; MGI: 1914631; GeneCards: MED4

Gene location (Human)
Chr.	Chromosome 13 (human)
Band	13q14.2	Start	48,053,323 bp
Band	13q14.2	End	48,095,131 bp

Gene location (Mouse)
Chr.	Chromosome 14 (mouse)
Band	14|14 D3	Start	73,747,465 bp
Band	14|14 D3	End	73,756,289 bp
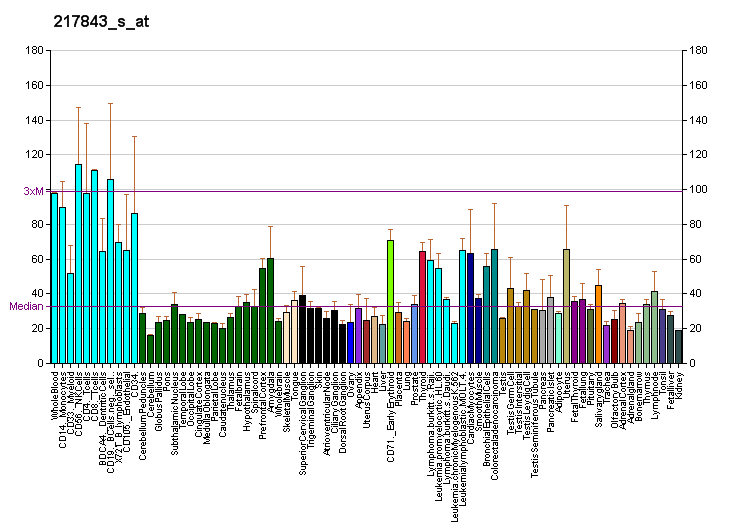
RNA expression pattern
Bgee	Human / Mouse (ortholog); Top expressed in: gonad; gingival epithelium; palpebral conjunctiva; germinal epithelium; rectum; monocyte; epithelium of nasopharynx; testicle; right testis; tibial arteries / Top expressed in: primary oocyte; interventricular septum; morula; ventricular zone; embryo; embryo; epiblast; abdominal wall; primitive streak; medial ganglionic eminence; More reference expression data
BioGPS	More reference expression data
Gene ontology
Molecular function	thyroid hormone receptor binding; protein binding; transcription coregulator activity; nuclear receptor coactivator activity; vitamin D receptor binding; signaling receptor activity
Cellular component	core mediator complex; membrane; nucleus; mediator complex; nucleoplasm
Biological process	regulation of transcription by RNA polymerase II; positive regulation of transcription, DNA-templated; androgen receptor signaling pathway; intracellular steroid hormone receptor signaling pathway; regulation of transcription, DNA-templated; transcription by RNA polymerase II; transcription, DNA-templated; transcription initiation from RNA polymerase II promoter
Sources:Amigo / QuickGO
Orthologs
Databases	NCBI: entry; OMA: entry
Species	Human	Mouse
Entrez	29079	67381
Ensembl	ENSG00000136146	ENSMUSG00000022109
UniProt	Q9NPJ6	Q9CQA5
RefSeq (mRNA)	NM_014166; NM_001270629	NM_026119
RefSeq (protein)	NP_001257558; NP_054885	NP_080395
Location (UCSC)	Chr 13: 48.05 – 48.1 Mb	Chr 14: 73.75 – 73.76 Mb
PubMed search
- Wikidata
View/Edit Human	View/Edit Mouse

Med4

Identifiers
- Symbol: Med4
- Pfam: PF10018
- InterPro: IPR019258
Available protein structures:
- PDB: IPR019258 PF10018 (ECOD; PDBsum)
- AlphaFold: IPR019258; PF10018

Mediator of RNA polymerase II transcription subunit 4 also known as mediator complex subunit 4 (MED4), a component of Mediator or vitamin D3 receptor-interacting protein complex 36 kDa component (DRIP36) is a protein that in humans is encoded by the MED4 gene.

== Function ==
The protein encoded by this gene is a component of the vitamin D receptor-interacting protein (DRIP) complex which functions as a nuclear receptor coactivator. The DRIP complex is capable of activating nuclear receptors in a ligand-dependent manner.

== Interactions ==
MED4 has been shown to interact with MED25.
