= MED9 =

Protein-coding gene in the species Homo sapiens

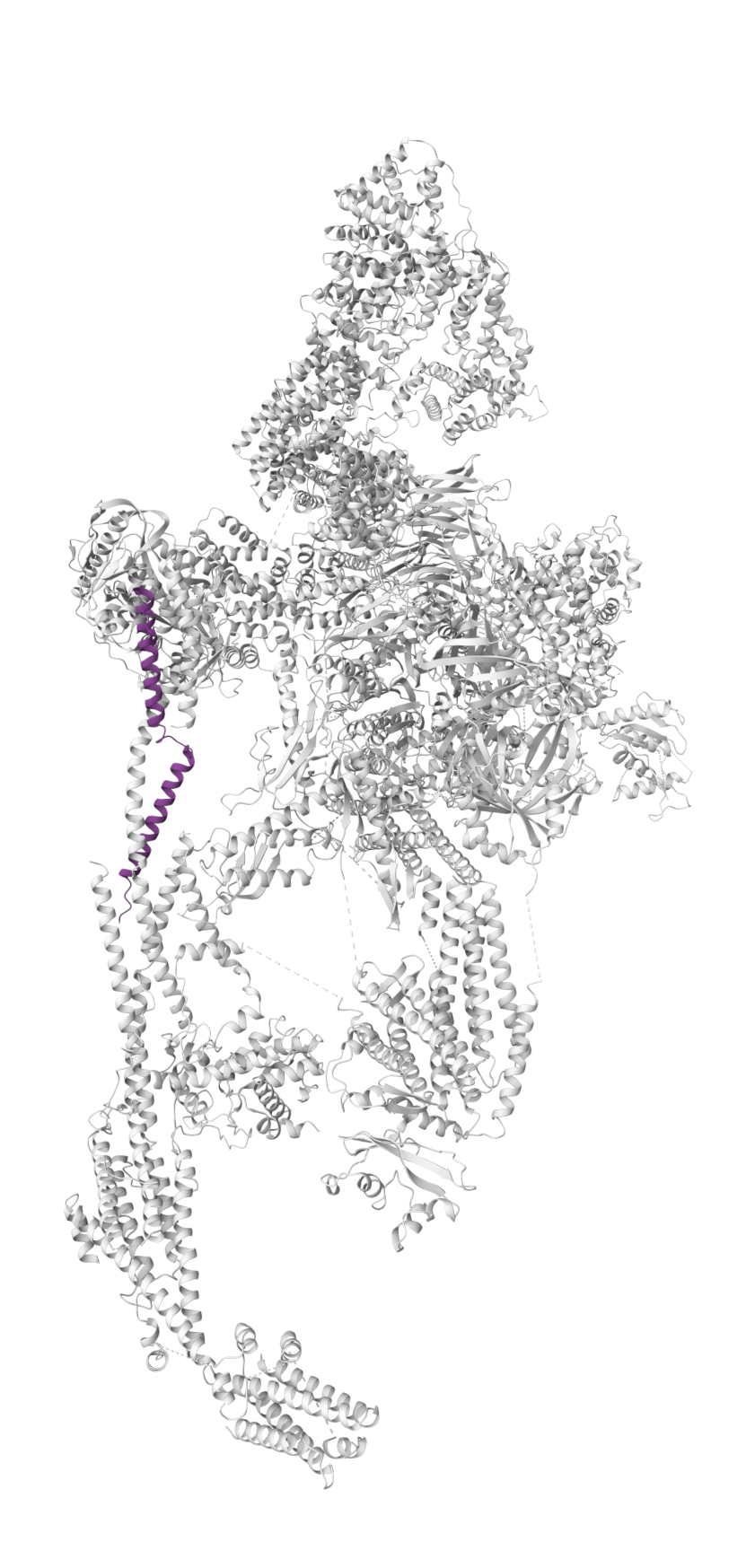

Identifiers
- Aliases: MED9, MED25, mediator complex subunit 9
- External IDs: OMIM: 609878; MGI: 2183151; GeneCards: MED9

Gene location (Human)
| Chr. | Chromosome 17 (human) |
| Band | 17p11.2 | Start | 17,476,994 bp |
| Band | 17p11.2 | End | 17,493,221 bp |

Gene location (Mouse)
| Chr. | Chromosome 11 (mouse) |
| Band | 11|11 B1.3 | Start | 59,839,032 bp |
| Band | 11|11 B1.3 | End | 59,853,031 bp |
RNA expression pattern
| Bgee | Human / Mouse (ortholog); Top expressed in: apex of heart; left ventricle; right auricle of heart; muscle of thigh; right frontal lobe; gonad; gastrocnemius muscle; anterior cingulate cortex; nucleus accumbens; caudate nucleus / Top expressed in: seminiferous tubule; internal carotid artery; yolk sac; external carotid artery; neural layer of retina; lens; somite; muscle of thigh; dentate gyrus of hippocampal formation granule cell; atrium; More reference expression data |
| BioGPS | n/a |
Gene ontology
| Molecular function | transcription coregulator activity; protein binding |
| Cellular component | mediator complex; nucleus |
| Biological process | regulation of transcription by RNA polymerase II; regulation of transcription, DNA-templated; transcription, DNA-templated |
Sources:Amigo / QuickGO
Orthologs
| Databases | NCBI: entry; OMA: entry |
| Species | Human | Mouse |
| Entrez | 55090 | 192191 |
| Ensembl | ENSG00000141026 | ENSMUSG00000061650 |
| UniProt | Q9NWA0 | Q8VCS6 |
| RefSeq (mRNA) | NM_018019 | NM_138675 |
| RefSeq (protein) | NP_060489 | NP_619616 |
| Location (UCSC) | Chr 17: 17.48 – 17.49 Mb | Chr 11: 59.84 – 59.85 Mb |
| PubMed search |
- Wikidata
| View/Edit Human | View/Edit Mouse |

Mediator complex subunit 9 (Med9) is a protein that in humans is encoded by the MED9 gene.

== Function ==
The multiprotein Mediator complex is a coactivator required for activation of RNA polymerase II transcription by DNA bound transcription factors. The protein encoded by this gene is thought to be a subunit of the Mediator complex. This gene is located within the Smith–Magenis syndrome region on chromosome 17. [provided by RefSeq, Jul 2008].

== See also ==
- Mediator
