= MED20 =

Protein-coding gene in the species Homo sapiens

Identifiers
- Aliases: MED20, PRO0213, TRFP, mediator complex subunit 20, SRB2
- External IDs: OMIM: 612915; MGI: 1929648; GeneCards: MED20

Gene location (Human)
Chr.	Chromosome 6 (human)
Band	6p21.1	Start	41,905,354 bp
Band	6p21.1	End	41,921,139 bp

Gene location (Mouse)
Chr.	Chromosome 17 (mouse)
Band	17|17 C	Start	47,611,582 bp
Band	17|17 C	End	47,624,418 bp
RNA expression pattern
Bgee	Human / Mouse (ortholog); Top expressed in: secondary oocyte; gonad; islet of Langerhans; stromal cell of endometrium; gingival epithelium; ganglionic eminence; hair follicle; gastrocnemius muscle; testicle; right adrenal cortex / Top expressed in: Paneth cell; medullary collecting duct; endocardial cushion; condyle; conjunctival fornix; external carotid artery; primary oocyte; internal carotid artery; renal corpuscle; secondary oocyte; More reference expression data
BioGPS	n/a
Gene ontology
Molecular function	DNA-directed 5'-3' RNA polymerase activity; transcription coactivator activity; transcription coregulator activity; protein binding; ubiquitin protein ligase activity
Cellular component	mediator complex; nucleus; nucleoplasm; ubiquitin ligase complex
Biological process	transcription initiation from RNA polymerase II promoter; regulation of transcription, DNA-templated; transcription by RNA polymerase II; protein ubiquitination; transcription, DNA-templated; regulation of transcription by RNA polymerase II; skeletal muscle cell differentiation; positive regulation of nucleic acid-templated transcription
Sources:Amigo / QuickGO
Orthologs
Databases	NCBI: entry; OMA: entry
Species	Human	Mouse
Entrez	9477	56771
Ensembl	ENSG00000124641	ENSMUSG00000092558
UniProt	Q9H944	Q9R0X0
RefSeq (mRNA)	NM_001305455; NM_001305456; NM_001305457; NM_004275	NM_020048
RefSeq (protein)	NP_001292384; NP_001292385; NP_001292386; NP_004266	NP_064432; NP_001351855; NP_001351856
Location (UCSC)	Chr 6: 41.91 – 41.92 Mb	Chr 17: 47.61 – 47.62 Mb
PubMed search
- Wikidata
View/Edit Human	View/Edit Mouse

Mediator of RNA polymerase II transcription subunit 20 (Med20) is a protein that in humans is encoded by the MED20 gene. Mutations in the MED20 are associated with basal ganglia degeneration and brain atrophy in infants.

== See also ==
- Mediator
