= MED19 =

Protein-coding gene in the species Homo sapiens

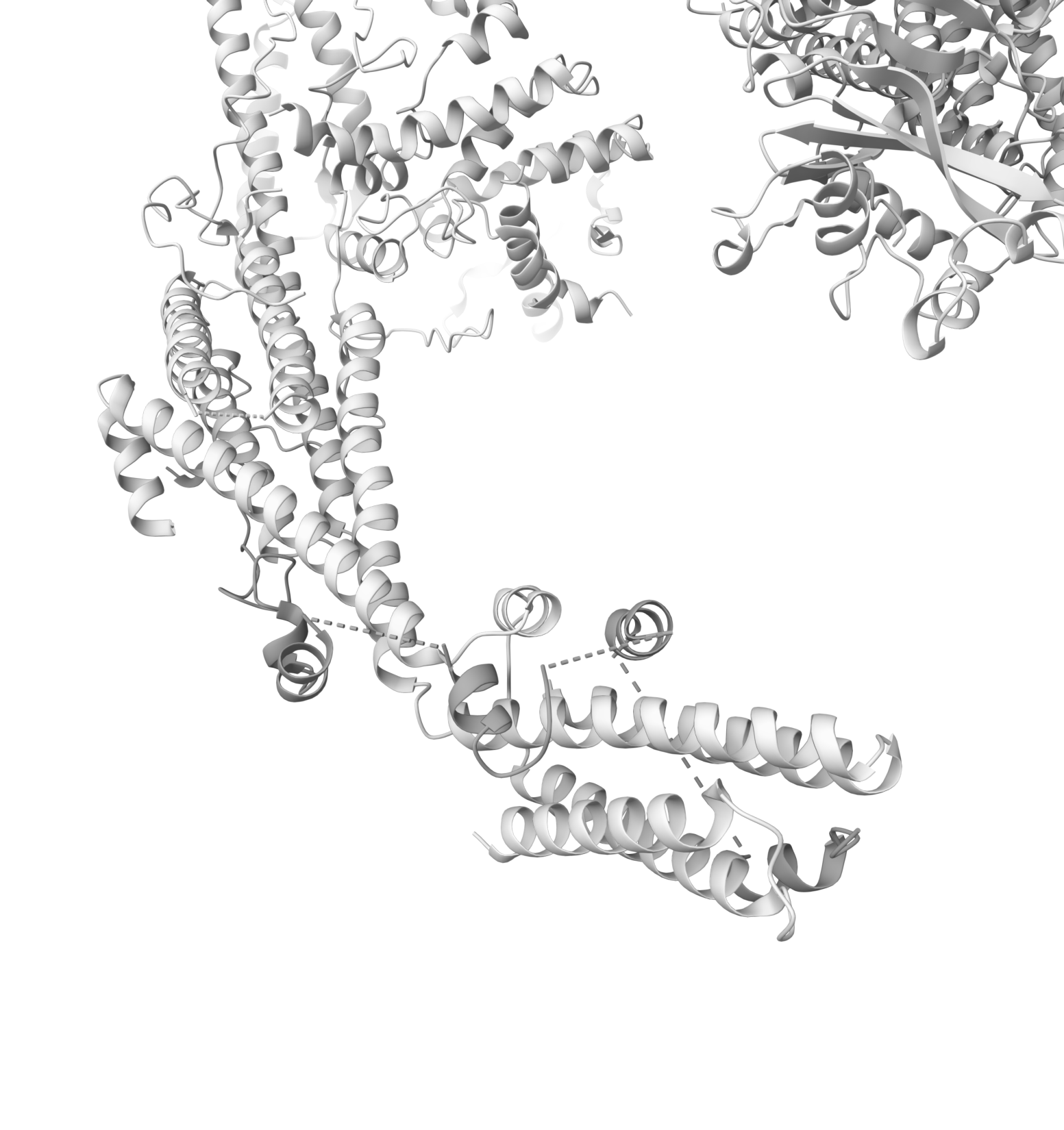

Identifiers
- Aliases: MED19, DT2P1G7, LCMR1, MED19AS, mediator complex subunit 19
- External IDs: OMIM: 612385; MGI: 1914234; GeneCards: MED19

Gene location (Human)
Chr.	Chromosome 11 (human)
Band	11q12.1	Start	57,703,710 bp
Band	11q12.1	End	57,712,221 bp

Gene location (Mouse)
Chr.	Chromosome 2 (mouse)
Band	2|2 D	Start	84,508,746 bp
Band	2|2 D	End	84,518,559 bp
RNA expression pattern
Bgee	Human / Mouse (ortholog); Top expressed in: oocyte; endothelial cell; secondary oocyte; pancreatic ductal cell; gonad; nipple; mucosa of ileum; sural nerve; tibialis anterior muscle; skin of arm / Top expressed in: pineal gland; medial ganglionic eminence; spermatocyte; ventricular zone; cumulus cell; abdominal wall; olfactory epithelium; epiblast; lens; primitive streak; More reference expression data
BioGPS	n/a
Gene ontology
Molecular function	protein binding; transcription coregulator activity; transcription factor binding
Cellular component	nucleus; mediator complex; nuclear body
Biological process	regulation of transcription by RNA polymerase II; transcription, DNA-templated; regulation of transcription, DNA-templated; positive regulation of transcription by RNA polymerase II
Sources:Amigo / QuickGO
Orthologs
Databases	NCBI: entry; OMA: entry
Species	Human	Mouse
Entrez	219541	381379
Ensembl	ENSG00000156603	ENSMUSG00000027080
UniProt	A0JLT2	Q8C1S0
RefSeq (mRNA)	NM_153450; NM_001317078	NM_025885
RefSeq (protein)	NP_001304007; NP_703151	NP_080161
Location (UCSC)	Chr 11: 57.7 – 57.71 Mb	Chr 2: 84.51 – 84.52 Mb
PubMed search
- Wikidata
View/Edit Human	View/Edit Mouse

Mediator complex subunit 19 (Med19) is a protein that in humans is encoded by the MED19 gene.

== Function ==
The protein encoded by this gene is a subunit of the Mediator complex, which binds to gene-specific regulatory factors and provides support for the basal RNA polymerase II transcription machinery. This gene has been implicated in the growth of several types of cancer, and inhibition of its expression inhibits the growth and spread of these cancers. Two transcript variants encoding different isoforms have been found for this gene. [provided by RefSeq, Nov 2015].

== See also ==
- Mediator
