= MED27 =

Protein-coding gene in the species Homo sapiens

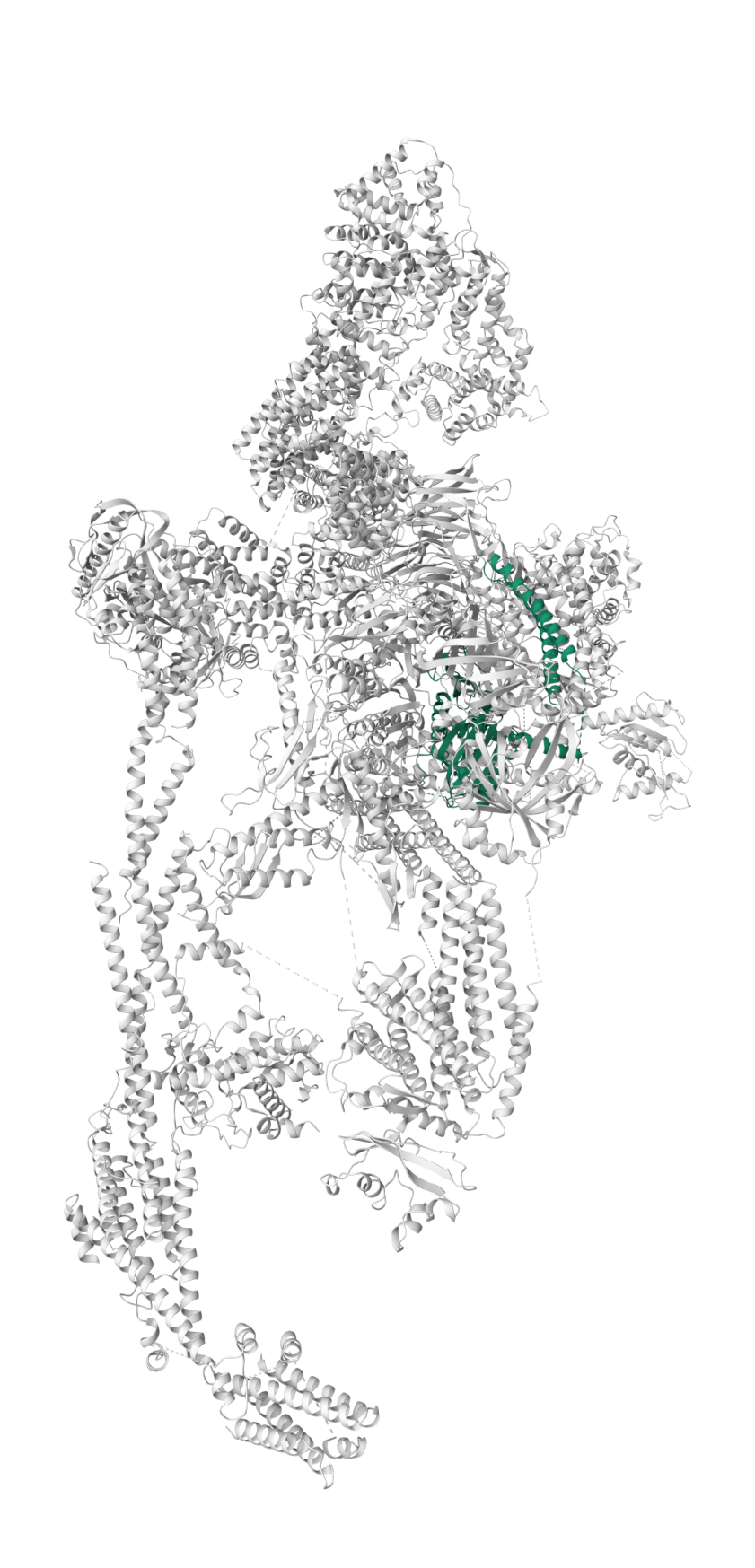

Identifiers
- Aliases: MED27, CRAP34, CRSP34, CRSP8, TRAP37, MED3, mediator complex subunit 27, NEDSCAC
- External IDs: OMIM: 605044; MGI: 1916225; GeneCards: MED27

Gene location (Human)
Chr.	Chromosome 9 (human)
Band	9q34.13	Start	131,852,928 bp
Band	9q34.13	End	132,079,867 bp

Gene location (Mouse)
Chr.	Chromosome 2 (mouse)
Band	2 B|2 19.84 cM	Start	29,236,831 bp
Band	2 B|2 19.84 cM	End	29,414,805 bp
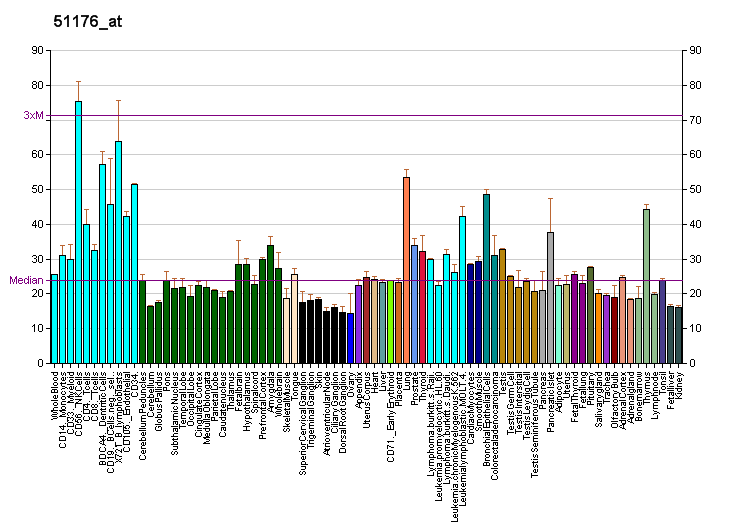

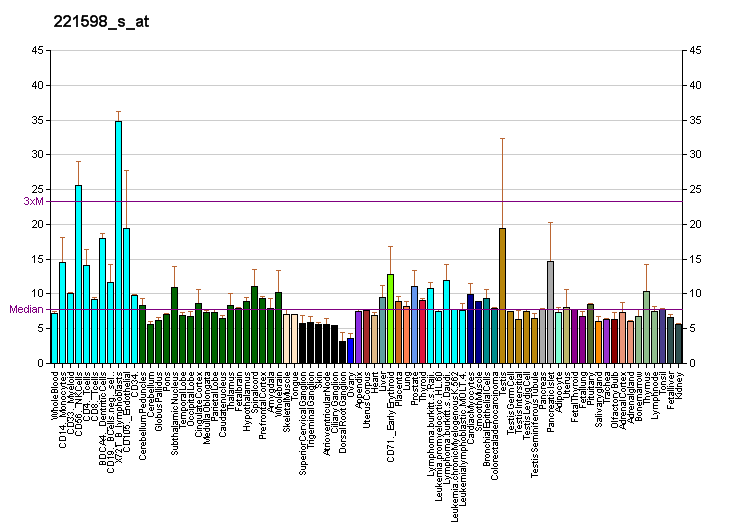
RNA expression pattern
Bgee	Human / Mouse (ortholog); Top expressed in: oocyte; endothelial cell; secondary oocyte; ganglionic eminence; islet of Langerhans; popliteal artery; tibial arteries; thoracic aorta; ascending aorta; ventricular zone / Top expressed in: zygote; superior surface of tongue; gallbladder; plantaris muscle; extensor digitorum longus muscle; entorhinal cortex; perirhinal cortex; corneal stroma; secondary oocyte; CA3 field; More reference expression data
BioGPS	More reference expression data
Gene ontology
Molecular function	transcription coactivator activity; protein binding; ubiquitin protein ligase activity
Cellular component	mediator complex; nucleolus; nucleus; transcription regulator complex; nucleoplasm; ubiquitin ligase complex; cytosol
Biological process	regulation of transcription by RNA polymerase II; stem cell population maintenance; transcription initiation from RNA polymerase II promoter; regulation of transcription, DNA-templated; protein ubiquitination; transcription, DNA-templated; positive regulation of nucleic acid-templated transcription
Sources:Amigo / QuickGO
Orthologs
Databases	NCBI: entry; OMA: entry
Species	Human	Mouse
Entrez	9442	68975
Ensembl	ENSG00000160563	ENSMUSG00000026799
UniProt	Q6P2C8	Q9DB40
RefSeq (mRNA)	NM_001253881; NM_001253882; NM_004269	NM_001290489; NM_026896; NM_029615; NM_001290490
RefSeq (protein)	NP_001240810; NP_001240811; NP_004260	NP_001277418; NP_001277419; NP_081172; NP_083891
Location (UCSC)	Chr 9: 131.85 – 132.08 Mb	Chr 2: 29.24 – 29.41 Mb
PubMed search
- Wikidata
View/Edit Human	View/Edit Mouse

Med27

Identifiers
- Symbol: Med27
- Pfam: PF11571
- InterPro: IPR021627
Available protein structures:
- PDB: IPR021627 PF11571 (ECOD; PDBsum)
- AlphaFold: IPR021627; PF11571

Mediator of RNA polymerase II transcription subunit 27 is an enzyme that in humans is encoded by the MED27 gene. It forms part of the Mediator complex.

The ubiquitous expression of Med27 mRNA suggests a universal requirement for Med27 in transcriptional initiation. Loss of Crsp34/Med27 decreases amacrine cell number, but increases the number of rod photoreceptor cells.

The activation of gene transcription is a multistep process that is triggered by factors that recognize transcriptional enhancer sites in DNA. These factors work with co-activators to direct transcriptional initiation by the RNA polymerase II apparatus. The protein encoded by this gene is a subunit of the CRSP (cofactor required for SP1 activation) complex, which, along with TFIID, is required for efficient activation by SP1. This protein is also a component of other multisubunit complexes e.g. thyroid hormone receptor-(TR-) associated proteins which interact with TR and facilitate TR function on DNA templates in conjunction with initiation factors and cofactors.

== See also ==
- Mediator complex
