= MED12L =

Protein-coding gene in the species Homo sapiens

Identifiers
- Aliases: MED12L, NOPAR, TNRC11L, TRALP, TRALPUSH, mediator complex subunit 12 like, mediator complex subunit 12L, NIZIDS
- External IDs: OMIM: 611318; MGI: 2139916; GeneCards: MED12L

Gene location (Human)
Chr.	Chromosome 3 (human)
Band	3q25.1	Start	151,085,286 bp
Band	3q25.1	End	151,437,072 bp

Gene location (Mouse)
Chr.	Chromosome 3 (mouse)
Band	3|3 D	Start	58,913,246 bp
Band	3|3 D	End	59,226,103 bp
RNA expression pattern
Bgee	Human / Mouse (ortholog); Top expressed in: monocyte; testicle; secondary oocyte; bone marrow cell; gonad; ventricular zone; ganglionic eminence; sural nerve; prefrontal cortex; Achilles tendon / Top expressed in: substantia nigra; olfactory epithelium; motor neuron; renal corpuscle; epithelium of lens; dorsomedial hypothalamic nucleus; fossa; lumbar subsegment of spinal cord; condyle; anterior horn of spinal cord; More reference expression data
BioGPS	n/a
Gene ontology
Molecular function	transcription coactivator activity; beta-catenin binding; transcription coregulator activity
Cellular component	nucleus; mediator complex
Biological process	regulation of transcription, DNA-templated; transcription, DNA-templated; positive regulation of transcription by RNA polymerase II; regulation of transcription by RNA polymerase II; transcription by RNA polymerase II; positive regulation of nucleic acid-templated transcription
Sources:Amigo / QuickGO
Orthologs
Databases	NCBI: entry; OMA: entry
Species	Human	Mouse
Entrez	116931	329650
Ensembl	ENSG00000144893	ENSMUSG00000056476
UniProt	Q86YW9	Q8BQM9
RefSeq (mRNA)	NM_053002; NM_001393769	NM_177855
RefSeq (protein)	NP_443728	NP_808523
Location (UCSC)	Chr 3: 151.09 – 151.44 Mb	Chr 3: 58.91 – 59.23 Mb
PubMed search
- Wikidata
View/Edit Human	View/Edit Mouse

Mediator complex subunit 12 like (Med12L) is a protein that in humans is encoded by the MED12L gene.

== Function ==
The protein encoded by this gene is part of the Mediator complex, which is involved in transcriptional coactivation of nearly all RNA polymerase II-dependent genes. The Mediator complex links gene-specific transcriptional activators with the basal transcription machinery. [provided by RefSeq, May 2010].

== See also ==
- Mediator
