= MED28 =

Protein-coding gene in the species Homo sapiens

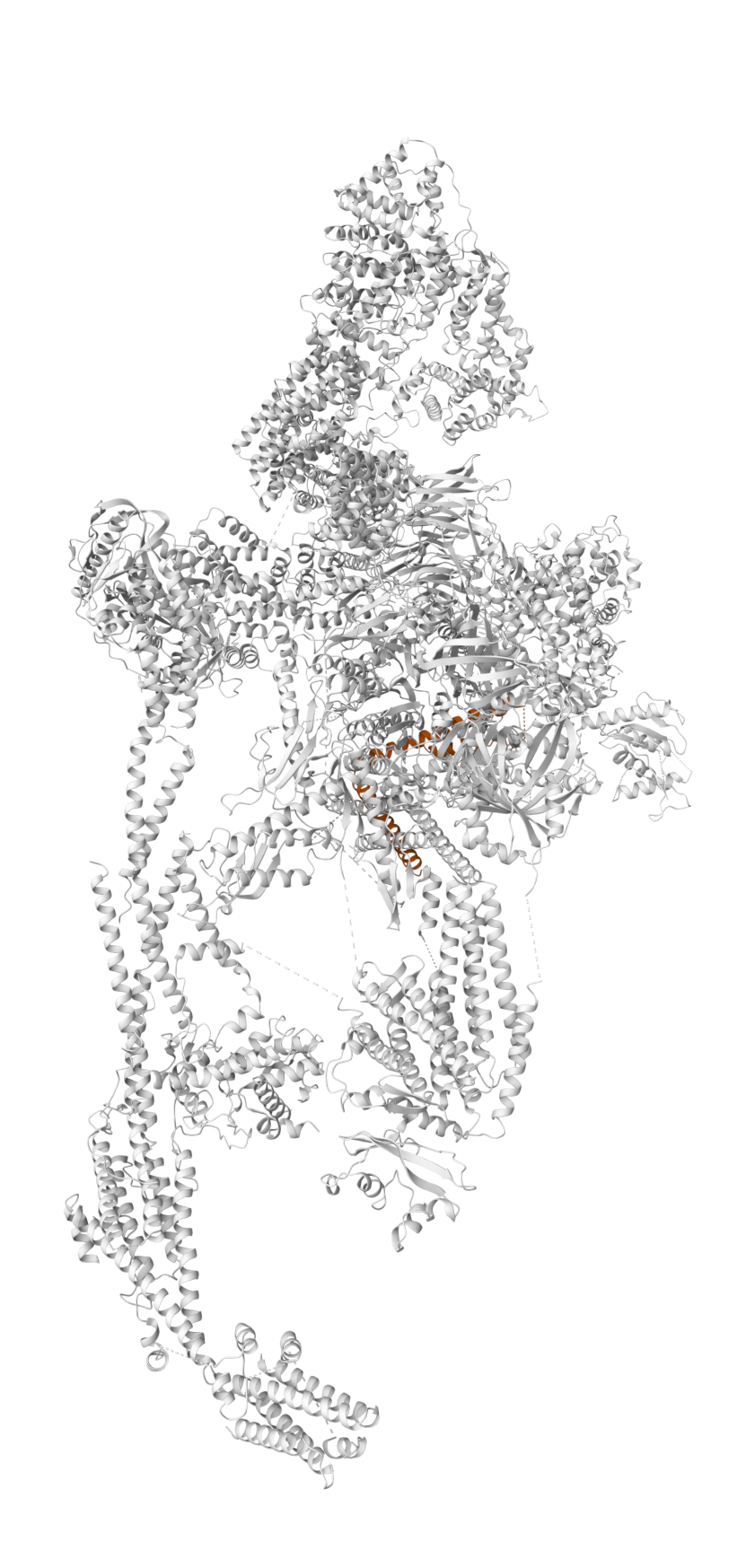

Identifiers
- Aliases: MED28, 1500003D12Rik, EG1, magicin, mediator complex subunit 28
- External IDs: OMIM: 610311; MGI: 1914249; GeneCards: MED28

Gene location (Human)
Chr.	Chromosome 4 (human)
Band	4p15.32	Start	17,614,641 bp
Band	4p15.32	End	17,634,105 bp

Gene location (Mouse)
Chr.	Chromosome 5 (mouse)
Band	5|5 B3	Start	45,677,571 bp
Band	5|5 B3	End	45,686,618 bp
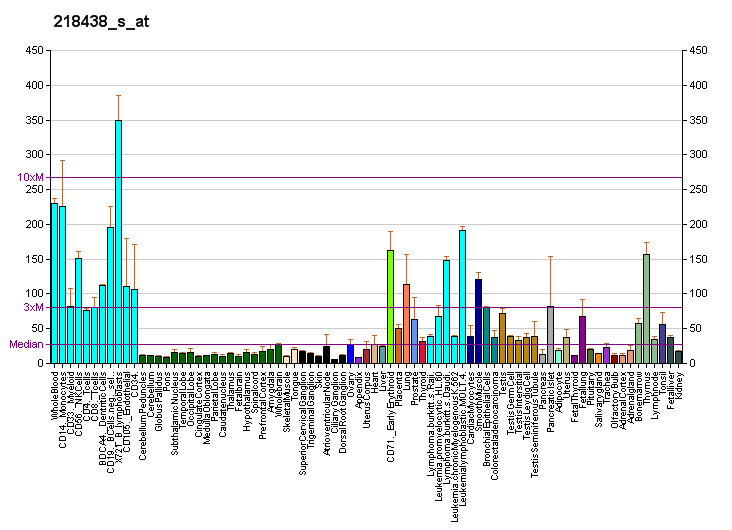
RNA expression pattern
Bgee	Human / Mouse (ortholog); Top expressed in: amniotic fluid; buccal mucosa cell; ventricular zone; monocyte; palpebral conjunctiva; embryo; ganglionic eminence; thymus; gastrocnemius muscle; cartilage tissue / Top expressed in: primary oocyte; medial ganglionic eminence; spermatid; right kidney; zygote; proximal tubule; spermatocyte; endocardial cushion; seminiferous tubule; arcuate nucleus; More reference expression data
BioGPS	More reference expression data
Gene ontology
Molecular function	actin binding; protein binding
Cellular component	cytoplasm; mediator complex; cytoskeleton; membrane; nucleus; cortical actin cytoskeleton; nucleoplasm
Biological process	stem cell population maintenance; regulation of transcription, DNA-templated; negative regulation of smooth muscle cell differentiation; transcription, DNA-templated
Sources:Amigo / QuickGO
Orthologs
Databases	NCBI: entry; OMA: entry
Species	Human	Mouse
Entrez	80306	66999
Ensembl	ENSG00000118579	ENSMUSG00000015804
UniProt	Q9H204	Q920D3
RefSeq (mRNA)	NM_025205	NM_025895
RefSeq (protein)	NP_079481	NP_080171
Location (UCSC)	Chr 4: 17.61 – 17.63 Mb	Chr 5: 45.68 – 45.69 Mb
PubMed search
- Wikidata
View/Edit Human	View/Edit Mouse

Med28

Identifiers
- Symbol: Med28
- Pfam: PF11594
- InterPro: IPR021640
Available protein structures:
- PDB: IPR021640 PF11594 (ECOD; PDBsum)
- AlphaFold: IPR021640; PF11594

Mediator of RNA polymerase II transcription subunit 28 is an enzyme that in humans is encoded by the MED28 gene. It forms part of the Mediator complex.

== Function ==
Subunit Med28 of the Mediator may function as a scaffolding protein within Mediator by maintaining the stability of a submodule within the head module, and components of this submodule act together in a gene-regulatory programme to suppress smooth muscle cell differentiation. Thus, mammalian Mediator subunit Med28 functions as a repressor of smooth muscle-cell differentiation, which could have implications for disorders associated with abnormalities in smooth muscle cell growth and differentiation, including atherosclerosis, asthma, hypertension, and smooth muscle tumours.

== Interactions ==
MED28 has been shown to interact with Merlin, Grb2 and MED26.

== See also ==
- Mediator complex
