= MED17 =

Protein-coding gene in the species Homo sapiens

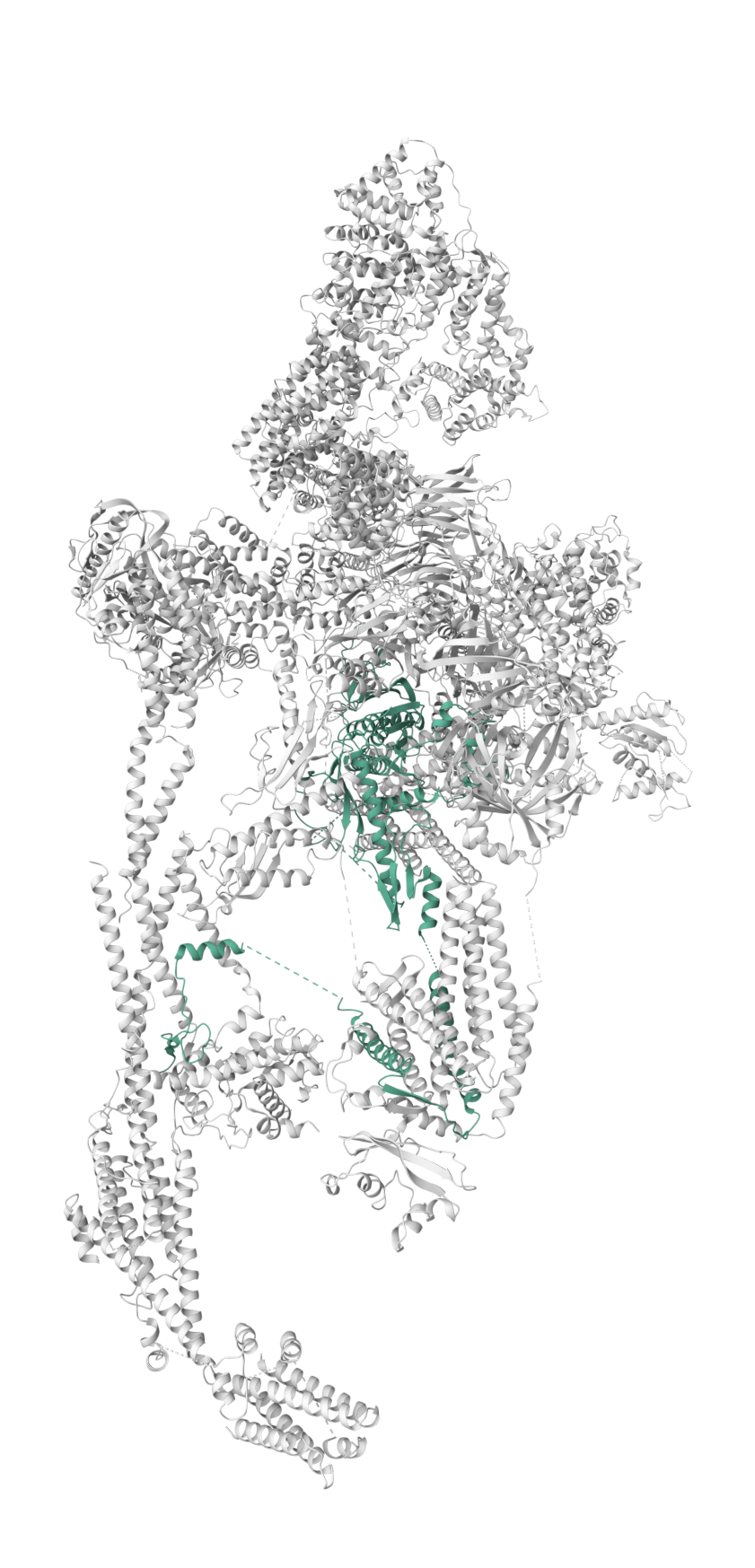

Identifiers
- Aliases: MED17, CRSP6, CRSP77, DRIP80, TRAP80, mediator complex subunit 17, SRB4
- External IDs: OMIM: 603810; MGI: 2182585; GeneCards: MED17

Gene location (Human)
Chr.	Chromosome 11 (human)
Band	11q21	Start	93,784,227 bp
Band	11q21	End	93,814,963 bp

Gene location (Mouse)
Chr.	Chromosome 9 (mouse)
Band	9|9 A2	Start	15,171,647 bp
Band	9|9 A2	End	15,191,227 bp
RNA expression pattern
Bgee	Human / Mouse (ortholog); Top expressed in: sural nerve; ventricular zone; ganglionic eminence; Achilles tendon; left ovary; right ovary; canal of the cervix; stromal cell of endometrium; granulocyte; body of uterus / Top expressed in: primary oocyte; granulocyte; zygote; secondary oocyte; epiblast; ventricular zone; morula; endocardial cushion; abdominal wall; dermis; More reference expression data
BioGPS	n/a
Gene ontology
Molecular function	transcription coregulator activity; thyroid hormone receptor binding; protein binding; nuclear receptor coactivator activity; vitamin D receptor binding; transcription coactivator activity; signaling receptor activity; ubiquitin protein ligase activity
Cellular component	membrane; transcription regulator complex; nucleoplasm; mediator complex; nucleus; core mediator complex; ubiquitin ligase complex
Biological process	androgen receptor signaling pathway; regulation of transcription, DNA-templated; intracellular steroid hormone receptor signaling pathway; transcription, DNA-templated; positive regulation of transcription, DNA-templated; positive regulation of transcription by RNA polymerase II; regulation of transcription by RNA polymerase II; transcription initiation from RNA polymerase II promoter; protein ubiquitination; stem cell population maintenance
Sources:Amigo / QuickGO
Orthologs
Databases	NCBI: entry; OMA: entry
Species	Human	Mouse
Entrez	9440	234959
Ensembl	ENSG00000042429	ENSMUSG00000031935
UniProt	Q9NVC6	Q8VCD5
RefSeq (mRNA)	NM_004268	NM_144933; NM_001364533
RefSeq (protein)	NP_004259	NP_659182; NP_001351462
Location (UCSC)	Chr 11: 93.78 – 93.81 Mb	Chr 9: 15.17 – 15.19 Mb
PubMed search
- Wikidata
View/Edit Human	View/Edit Mouse

Mediator of RNA polymerase II transcription subunit 17 is an enzyme that in humans is encoded by the MED17 gene.

The activation of gene transcription is a multistep process that is triggered by factors that recognize transcriptional enhancer sites in DNA. These factors work with co-activators to direct transcriptional initiation by the RNA polymerase II apparatus. The protein encoded by this gene is a subunit of the CRSP (cofactor required for SP1 activation) complex, which, along with TFIID, is required for efficient activation by SP1. This protein is also a component of other multisubunit complexes e.g. thyroid hormone receptor-(TR-) associated proteins which interact with TR and facilitate TR function on DNA templates in conjunction with initiation factors and cofactors.

== Interactions ==
MED17 has been shown to interact with PPARGC1A, Cyclin-dependent kinase 8 and BRCA1.
