= MED16 =

Protein-coding gene in the species Homo sapiens

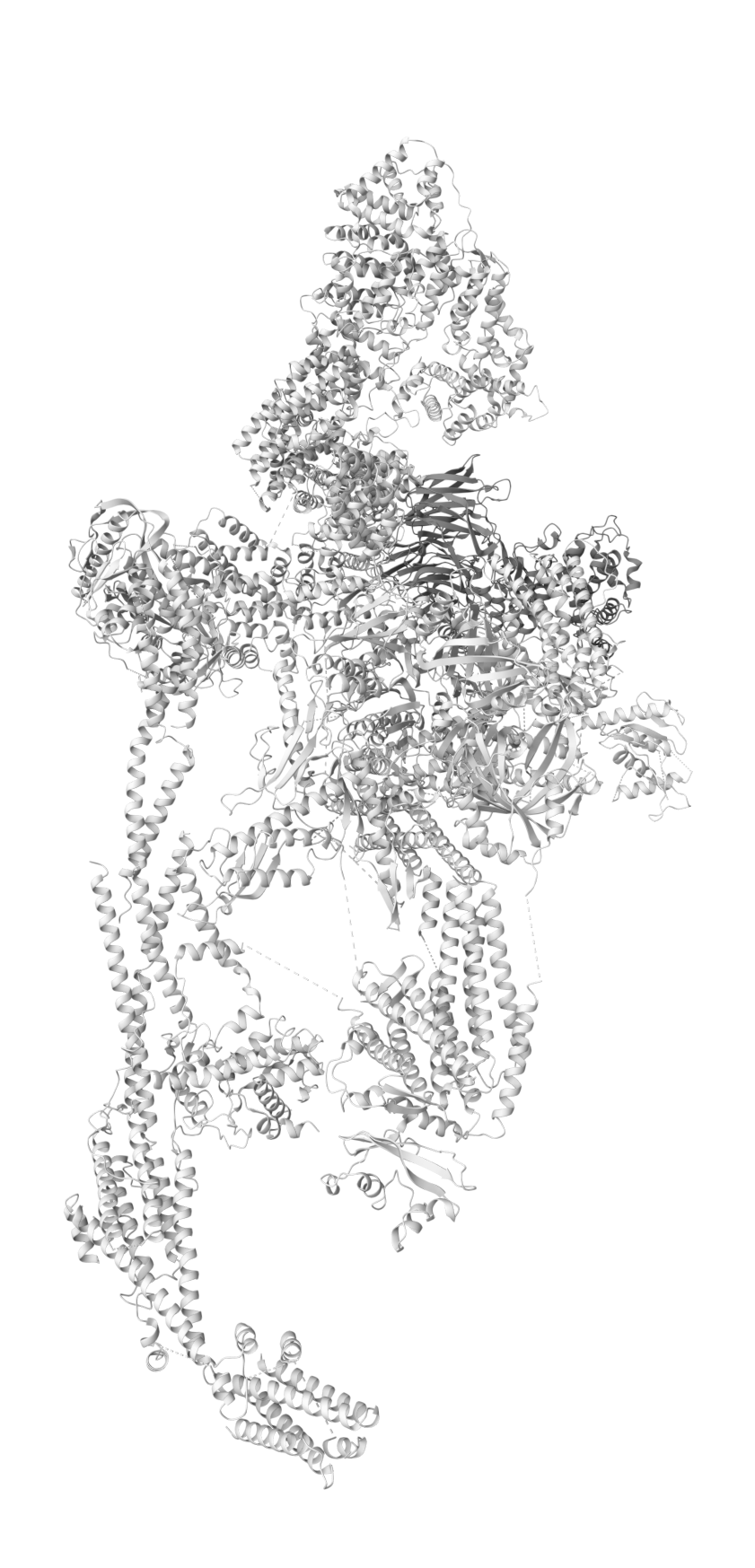

Identifiers
- Aliases: MED16, DRIP92, THRAP5, TRAP95, mediator complex subunit 16
- External IDs: OMIM: 604062; MGI: 2158394; GeneCards: MED16

Gene location (Human)
| Chr. | Chromosome 19 (human) |
| Band | 19p13.3 | Start | 867,630 bp |
| Band | 19p13.3 | End | 893,218 bp |

Gene location (Mouse)
| Chr. | Chromosome 10 (mouse) |
| Band | 10|10 C1 | Start | 79,730,542 bp |
| Band | 10|10 C1 | End | 79,744,757 bp |
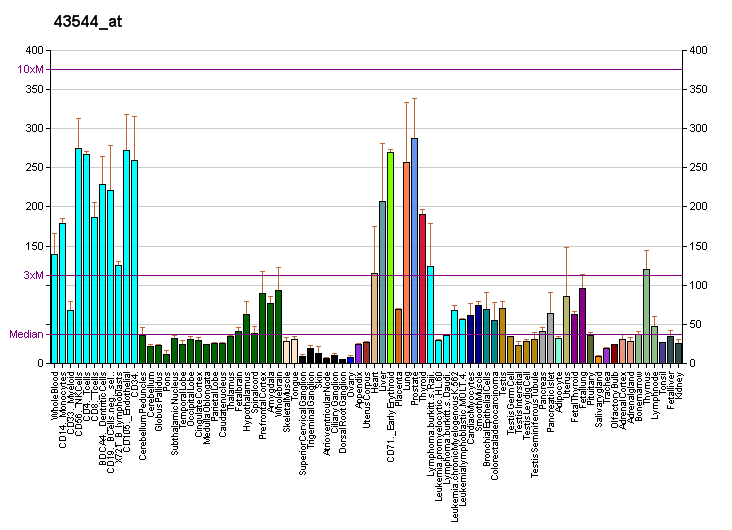

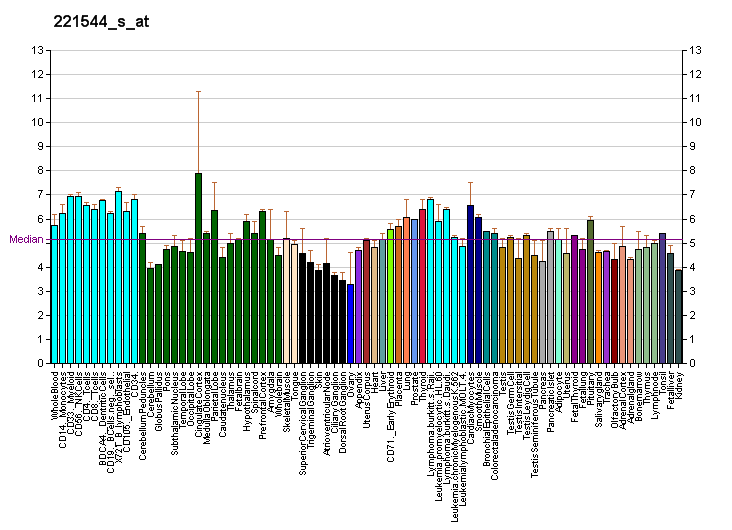

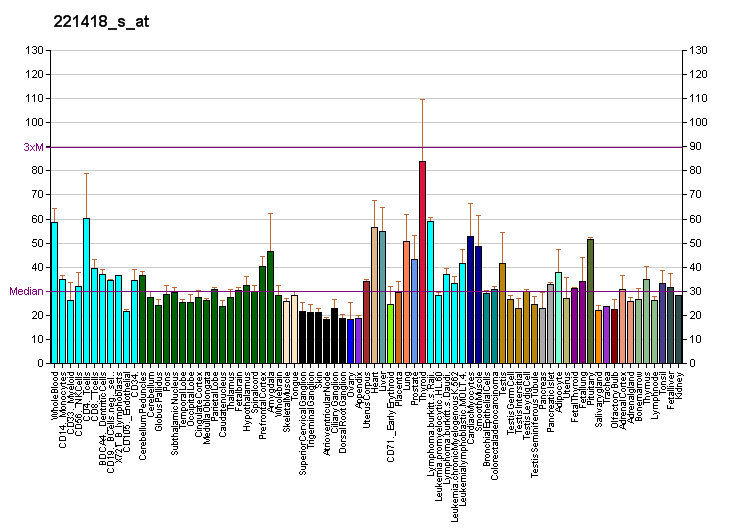
RNA expression pattern
| Bgee | Human / Mouse (ortholog); Top expressed in: mucosa of transverse colon; right uterine tube; right lobe of liver; gastric mucosa; canal of the cervix; apex of heart; gonad; granulocyte; anterior pituitary; muscle of thigh / Top expressed in: seminiferous tubule; internal carotid artery; external carotid artery; spermatocyte; Rostral migratory stream; epithelium of stomach; dentate gyrus of hippocampal formation granule cell; tibiofemoral joint; molar; extraocular muscle; More reference expression data |
| BioGPS | More reference expression data |
Gene ontology
| Molecular function | vitamin D receptor binding; transcription coregulator activity; thyroid hormone receptor binding; catalytic activity; transcription coactivator activity; protein binding; signaling receptor activity |
| Cellular component | nucleoplasm; nucleus; mediator complex; membrane |
| Biological process | transcription, DNA-templated; regulation of transcription by RNA polymerase II; androgen receptor signaling pathway; intracellular steroid hormone receptor signaling pathway; positive regulation of transcription, DNA-templated; regulation of transcription, DNA-templated; transcription by RNA polymerase II; transcription initiation from RNA polymerase II promoter; positive regulation of signaling receptor activity |
Sources:Amigo / QuickGO
Orthologs
| Databases | NCBI: entry; OMA: entry |
| Species | Human | Mouse |
| Entrez | 10025 | 216154 |
| Ensembl | ENSG00000282092; ENSG00000175221 | ENSMUSG00000013833 |
| UniProt | Q9Y2X0 | Q6PGF3 |
| RefSeq (mRNA) | NM_005481 | NM_001163276; NM_198107; NM_001359629 |
| RefSeq (protein) | NP_005472 | XP_006513550.1; XP_006513551.1 |
| Location (UCSC) | Chr 19: 0.87 – 0.89 Mb | Chr 10: 79.73 – 79.74 Mb |
| PubMed search |
- Wikidata
| View/Edit Human | View/Edit Mouse |

Mediator of RNA polymerase II transcription subunit 16 is an enzyme that in humans is encoded by the MED16 gene.

== Interactions ==
MED16 has been shown to interact with Thyroid hormone receptor alpha, Estrogen receptor alpha and Cyclin-dependent kinase 8.
