= MED22 =

Protein-coding gene in the species Homo sapiens

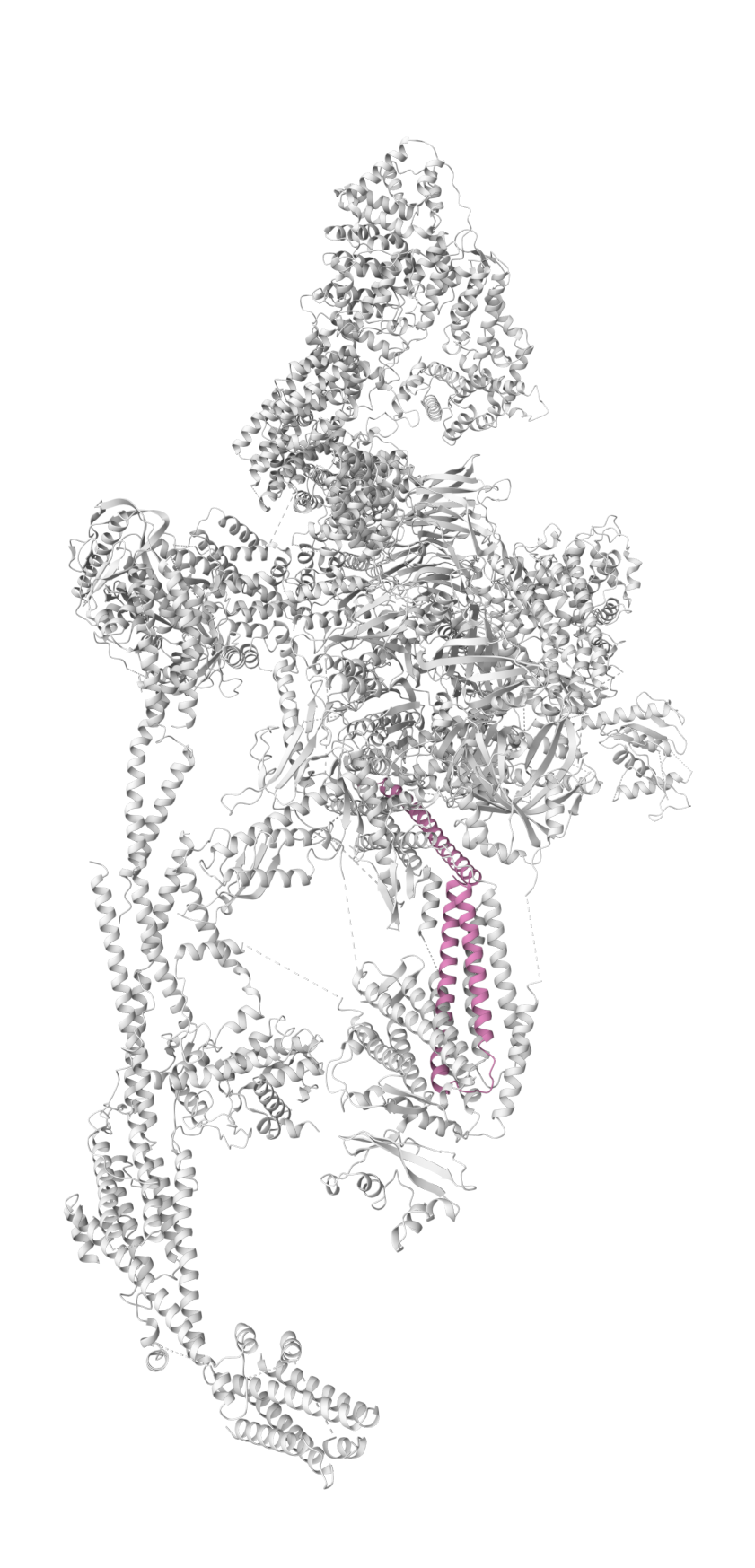

Identifiers
- Aliases: MED22, MED24, SURF5, surf-5, mediator complex subunit 22, SRB6
- External IDs: OMIM: 185641; MGI: 98446; GeneCards: MED22

Gene location (Human)
Chr.	Chromosome 9 (human)
Band	9q34.2	Start	133,338,312 bp
Band	9q34.2	End	133,348,131 bp

Gene location (Mouse)
Chr.	Chromosome 2 (mouse)
Band	2 A3|2 19.09 cM	Start	26,795,274 bp
Band	2 A3|2 19.09 cM	End	26,800,689 bp
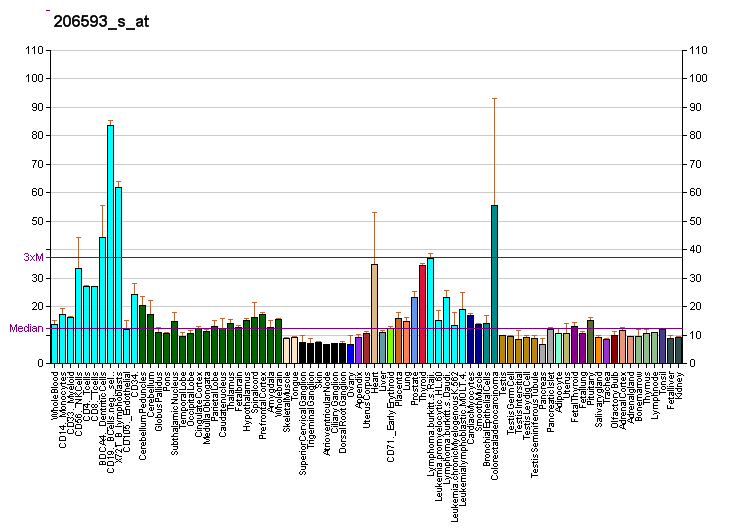
RNA expression pattern
Bgee	Human / Mouse (ortholog); Top expressed in: granulocyte; blood; sural nerve; muscle layer of sigmoid colon; right coronary artery; body of uterus; gastric mucosa; prefrontal cortex; apex of heart; left uterine tube / Top expressed in: ventricular zone; spermatocyte; Rostral migratory stream; ganglionic eminence; primary oocyte; medial ganglionic eminence; secondary oocyte; zygote; lip; lacrimal gland; More reference expression data
BioGPS	More reference expression data
Gene ontology
Molecular function	transcription coregulator activity; protein binding
Cellular component	cytoplasm; mediator complex; nucleus
Biological process	regulation of transcription by RNA polymerase II; regulation of transcription, DNA-templated; transcription, DNA-templated
Sources:Amigo / QuickGO
Orthologs
Databases	NCBI: entry; OMA: entry
Species	Human	Mouse
Entrez	6837	20933
Ensembl	ENSG00000281022; ENSG00000148297	ENSMUSG00000015776
UniProt	Q15528; Q5T8T8	Q62276
RefSeq (mRNA)	NM_181491; NM_006752; NM_133640	NM_001033908; NM_011513; NM_001378786; NM_001378787; NM_001378788
RefSeq (protein)	NP_598395; NP_852468	NP_001029080; NP_035643; NP_001365715; NP_001365716; NP_001365717
Location (UCSC)	Chr 9: 133.34 – 133.35 Mb	Chr 2: 26.8 – 26.8 Mb
PubMed search
- Wikidata
View/Edit Human	View/Edit Mouse

Mediator of RNA polymerase II transcription subunit 22 is an enzyme that in humans is encoded by the MED22 gene.

== Function ==
This gene is located in the surfeit gene cluster, a group of very tightly linked housekeeping genes that do not share sequence similarity. The gene is oriented in a head-to-head fashion with RPL7A (SURF3) and the two genes share a bidirectional promoter. The encoded proteins are localized to the cytoplasm. Two alternative transcript variants encoding different isoforms have been identified for this gene.

== Interactions ==
MED22 has been shown to interact with MED30.
