= MED11 =

Protein-coding gene in the species Homo sapiens

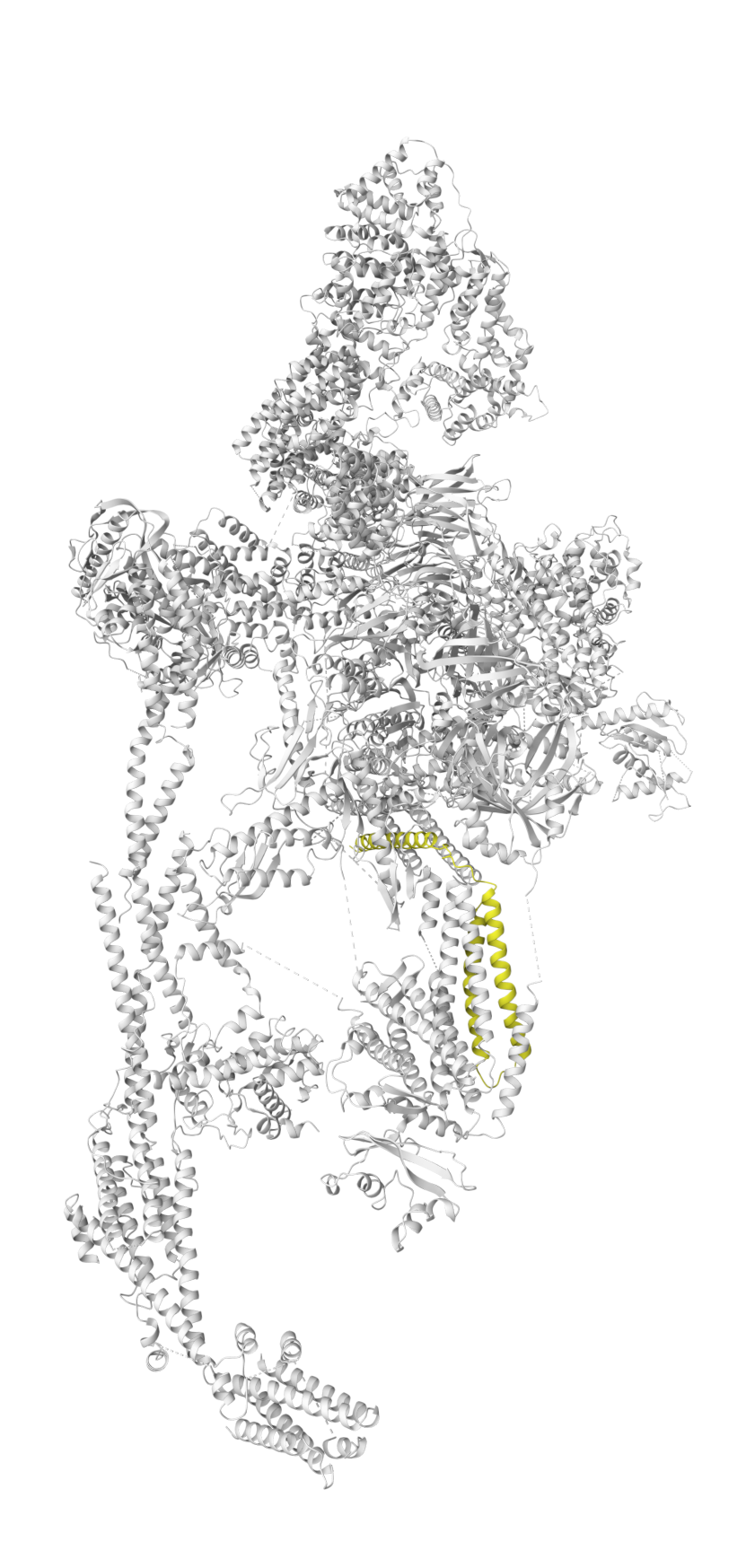

Identifiers
- Aliases: MED11, HSPC296, mediator complex subunit 11
- External IDs: OMIM: 612383; MGI: 1913422; GeneCards: MED11

Gene location (Human)
Chr.	Chromosome 17 (human)
Band	17p13.2	Start	4,731,428 bp
Band	17p13.2	End	4,733,608 bp

Gene location (Mouse)
Chr.	Chromosome 11 (mouse)
Band	11|11 B3	Start	70,342,745 bp
Band	11|11 B3	End	70,344,553 bp
RNA expression pattern
Bgee	Human / Mouse (ortholog); Top expressed in: right adrenal gland; right adrenal cortex; left adrenal gland; left adrenal cortex; skin of arm; granulocyte; apex of heart; myocardium of left ventricle; gonad; cardiac muscle tissue of right atrium / Top expressed in: internal carotid artery; external carotid artery; granulocyte; yolk sac; molar; epiblast; mesenteric lymph nodes; paraventricular nucleus of hypothalamus; embryo; medial vestibular nucleus; More reference expression data
BioGPS	n/a
Gene ontology
Molecular function	transcription coregulator activity; protein binding; ubiquitin protein ligase activity
Cellular component	mediator complex; nucleus; ubiquitin ligase complex
Biological process	regulation of transcription by RNA polymerase II; regulation of transcription, DNA-templated; protein ubiquitination; transcription, DNA-templated
Sources:Amigo / QuickGO
Orthologs
Databases	NCBI: entry; OMA: entry
Species	Human	Mouse
Entrez	400569	66172
Ensembl	ENSG00000161920	ENSMUSG00000018923
UniProt	Q9P086	Q9D8C6
RefSeq (mRNA)	NM_001305000; NM_001001683	NM_025397
RefSeq (protein)	NP_001001683; NP_001291929	NP_079673
Location (UCSC)	Chr 17: 4.73 – 4.73 Mb	Chr 11: 70.34 – 70.34 Mb
PubMed search
- Wikidata
View/Edit Human	View/Edit Mouse

Mediator complex subunit 11 (Med11) is a protein that in humans is encoded by the MED11 gene.

== Function ==
Med11 is a component of the Mediator complex, which is a coactivator for DNA-binding factors that activate transcription via RNA polymerase II.

== See also ==
- Mediator
