= MED21 =

Protein-coding gene in the species Homo sapiens

Identifiers
- Aliases: MED21, SRB7, SURB7, hSrb7, mediator complex subunit 21
- External IDs: OMIM: 603800; MGI: 1347064; GeneCards: MED21

Gene location (Human)
Chr.	Chromosome 12 (human)
Band	12p11.23	Start	27,022,546 bp
Band	12p11.23	End	27,066,343 bp

Gene location (Mouse)
Chr.	Chromosome 6 (mouse)
Band	6 G3|6 77.7 cM	Start	146,544,045 bp
Band	6 G3|6 77.7 cM	End	146,552,230 bp
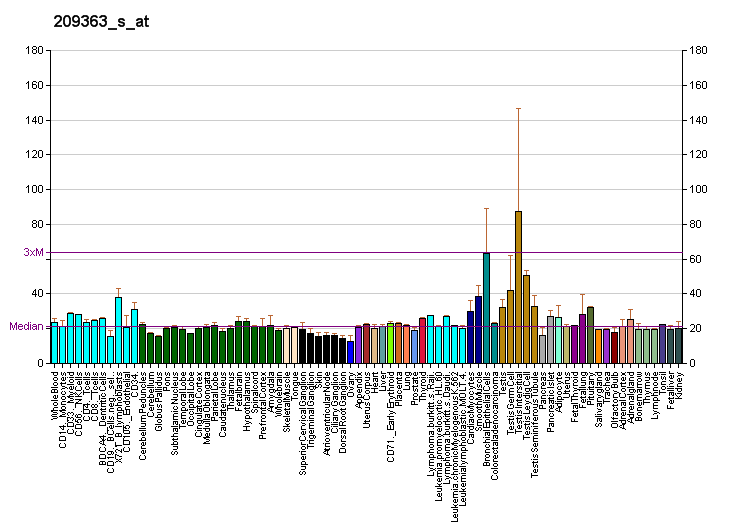

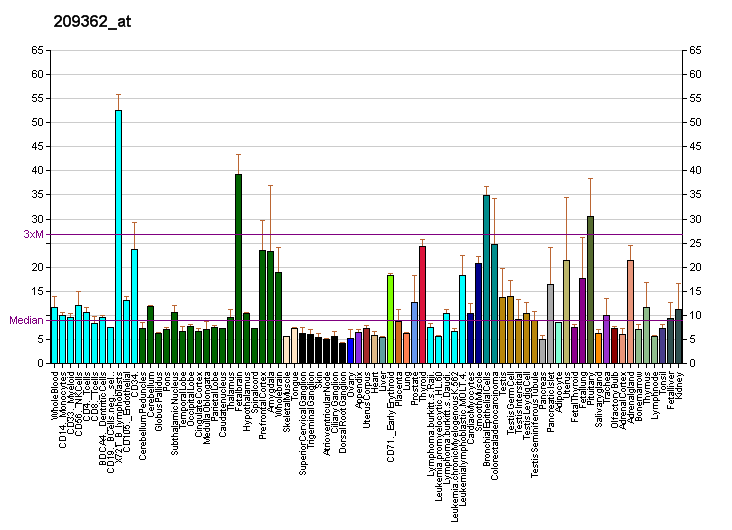
RNA expression pattern
Bgee	Human / Mouse (ortholog); Top expressed in: secondary oocyte; Achilles tendon; islet of Langerhans; testicle; right ventricle; muscle of thigh; ganglionic eminence; popliteal artery; tibial arteries; gonad / Top expressed in: zygote; right kidney; secondary oocyte; endocardial cushion; interventricular septum; tail of embryo; atrioventricular valve; ventricular zone; embryo; yolk sac; More reference expression data
BioGPS	More reference expression data
Gene ontology
Molecular function	DNA-directed 5'-3' RNA polymerase activity; transcription coactivator activity; transcription coregulator activity; protein binding; ubiquitin protein ligase activity
Cellular component	nucleus; ubiquitin ligase complex; mediator complex
Biological process	regulation of transcription by RNA polymerase II; stem cell population maintenance; regulation of transcription, DNA-templated; protein ubiquitination; blastocyst development; transcription, DNA-templated; positive regulation of transcription by RNA polymerase II; RNA biosynthetic process
Sources:Amigo / QuickGO
Orthologs
Databases	NCBI: entry; OMA: entry
Species	Human	Mouse
Entrez	9412	108098
Ensembl	ENSG00000152944	ENSMUSG00000030291
UniProt	Q13503	Q9CQ39
RefSeq (mRNA)	NM_001271811; NM_004264	NM_025315
RefSeq (protein)	NP_001258740; NP_004255	NP_079591
Location (UCSC)	Chr 12: 27.02 – 27.07 Mb	Chr 6: 146.54 – 146.55 Mb
PubMed search
- Wikidata
View/Edit Human	View/Edit Mouse

Mediator of RNA polymerase II transcription subunit 21 is an enzyme that in humans is encoded by the MED21 gene.

== Interactions ==
MED21 has been shown to interact with:

- BRCA1,
- CDK8,
- GTF2F1,
- GTF2H4,
- MED6, and
- POLR2A.
