= MED24 =

Protein-coding gene in the species Homo sapiens

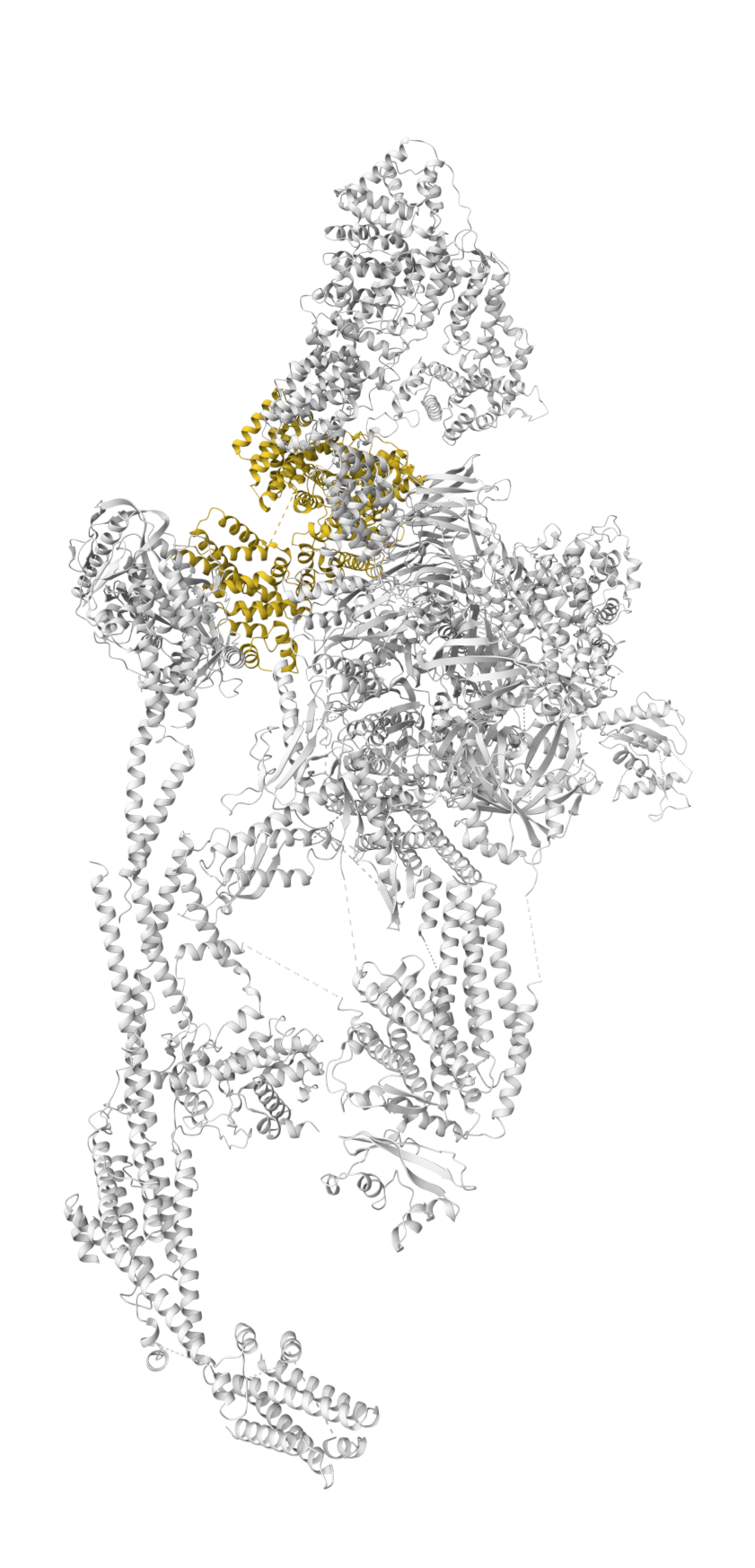

Identifiers
- Aliases: MED24, ARC100, CRSP100, CRSP4, DRIP100, THRAP4, TRAP100, MED5, mediator complex subunit 24
- External IDs: OMIM: 607000; MGI: 1344385; GeneCards: MED24

Gene location (Human)
Chr.	Chromosome 17 (human)
Band	17q21.1	Start	40,019,097 bp
Band	17q21.1	End	40,061,215 bp

Gene location (Mouse)
Chr.	Chromosome 11 (mouse)
Band	11 D|11 62.46 cM	Start	98,595,417 bp
Band	11 D|11 62.46 cM	End	98,620,261 bp
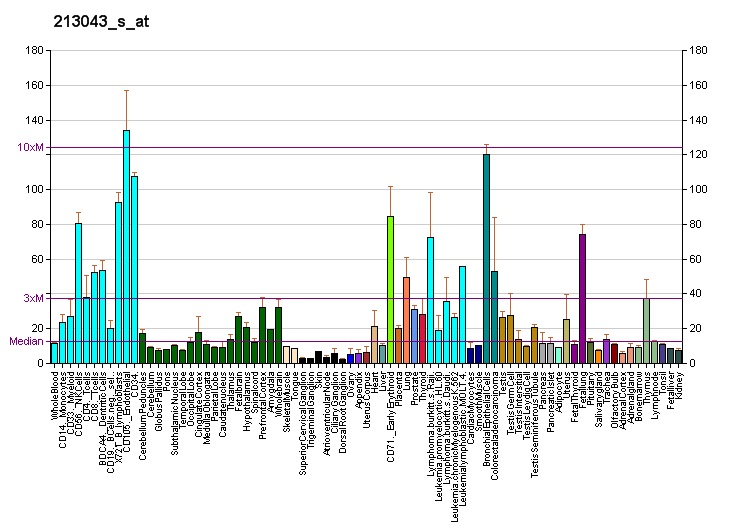
RNA expression pattern
Bgee	Human / Mouse (ortholog); Top expressed in: right hemisphere of cerebellum; right uterine tube; anterior pituitary; apex of heart; left ovary; gastrocnemius muscle; body of uterus; canal of the cervix; right ovary; ectocervix / Top expressed in: primary visual cortex; superior frontal gyrus; neural layer of retina; tail of embryo; dentate gyrus of hippocampal formation granule cell; entorhinal cortex; perirhinal cortex; yolk sac; ventricular zone; spermatid; More reference expression data
BioGPS	More reference expression data
Gene ontology
Molecular function	transcription coregulator activity; thyroid hormone receptor binding; protein binding; nuclear receptor coactivator activity; vitamin D receptor binding; signaling receptor activity
Cellular component	nucleoplasm; nucleus; mediator complex
Biological process	androgen receptor signaling pathway; regulation of transcription, DNA-templated; intracellular steroid hormone receptor signaling pathway; transcription, DNA-templated; positive regulation of transcription, DNA-templated; transcription initiation from RNA polymerase II promoter; regulation of transcription by RNA polymerase II
Sources:Amigo / QuickGO
Orthologs
Databases	NCBI: entry; OMA: entry
Species	Human	Mouse
Entrez	9862	23989
Ensembl	ENSG00000008838	ENSMUSG00000017210
UniProt	O75448	Q99K74
RefSeq (mRNA)	NM_001079518; NM_001267797; NM_014815; NM_001330211	NM_011869; NM_001361993; NM_001361994; NM_001361995; NM_001378926 NM_001378927
RefSeq (protein)	NP_001072986; NP_001254726; NP_001317140; NP_055630	NP_035999; NP_001348922; NP_001348923; NP_001348924; NP_001365855 NP_001365856
Location (UCSC)	Chr 17: 40.02 – 40.06 Mb	Chr 11: 98.6 – 98.62 Mb
PubMed search
- Wikidata
View/Edit Human	View/Edit Mouse

Mediator of RNA polymerase II transcription subunit 24 is an enzyme that in humans is encoded by the MED24 gene.

== Function ==
This gene encodes a component of the mediator complex (also known as TRAP, SMCC, DRIP, or ARC), a transcriptional coactivator complex thought to be required for the expression of almost all genes. The mediator complex is recruited by transcriptional activators or nuclear receptors to induce gene expression, possibly by interacting with RNA polymerase II and promoting the formation of a transcriptional pre-initiation complex. Multiple transcript variants encoding different isoforms have been found for this gene.

== Interactions ==
MED24 has been shown to interact with Estrogen receptor alpha, and Cyclin-dependent kinase 8, Calcitriol receptor
