= MED7 =

Protein-coding gene in the species Homo sapiens

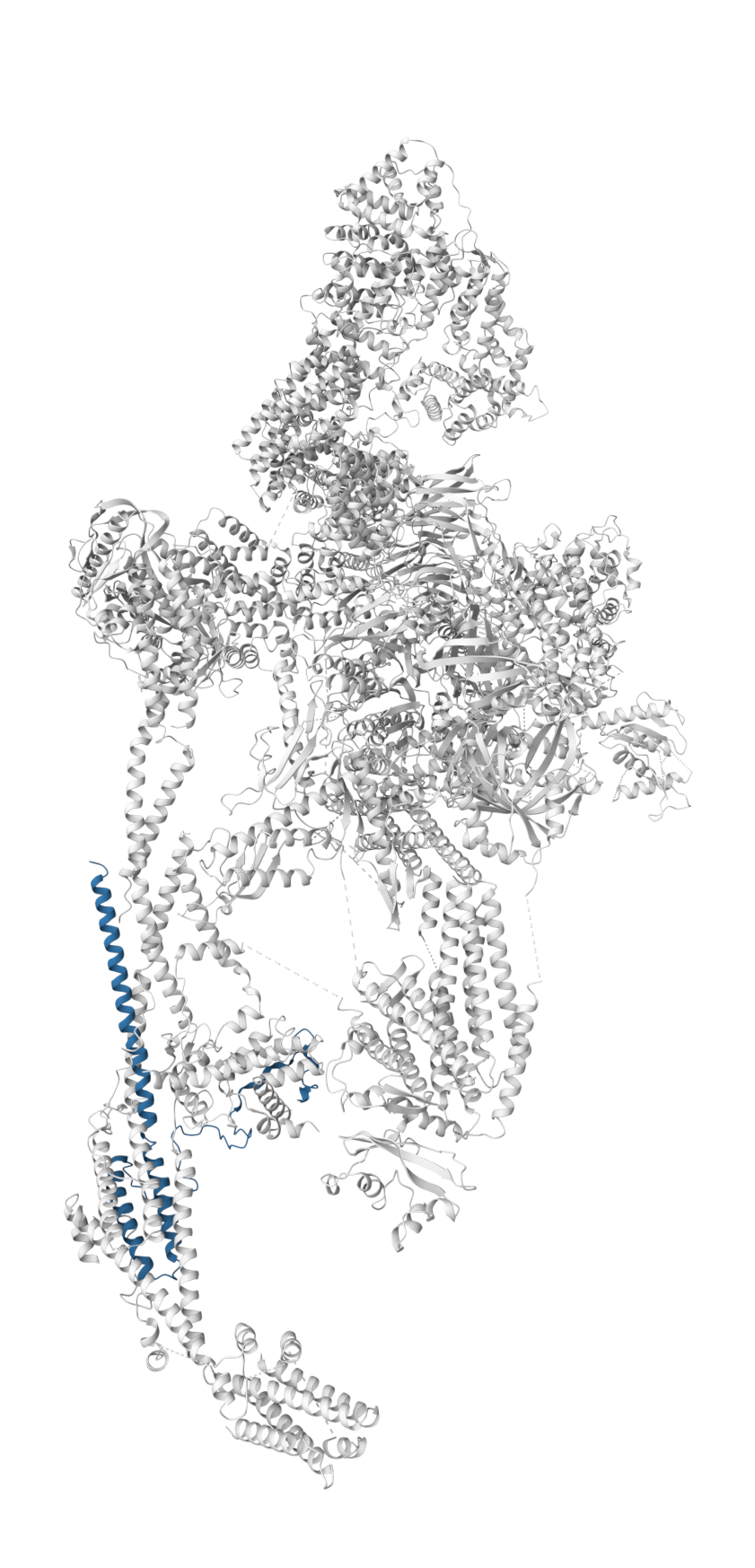

Identifiers
- Aliases: MED7, ARC34, CRSP33, CRSP9, mediator complex subunit 7
- External IDs: OMIM: 605045; MGI: 1913463; GeneCards: MED7

Gene location (Human)
Chr.	Chromosome 5 (human)
Band	5q33.3	Start	157,137,424 bp
Band	5q33.3	End	157,159,019 bp

Gene location (Mouse)
Chr.	Chromosome 11 (mouse)
Band	11|11 B1.1	Start	46,327,752 bp
Band	11|11 B1.1	End	46,333,548 bp
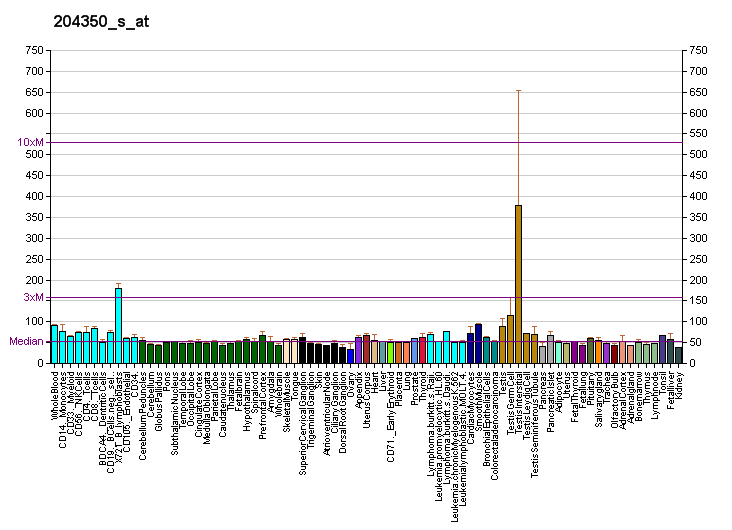

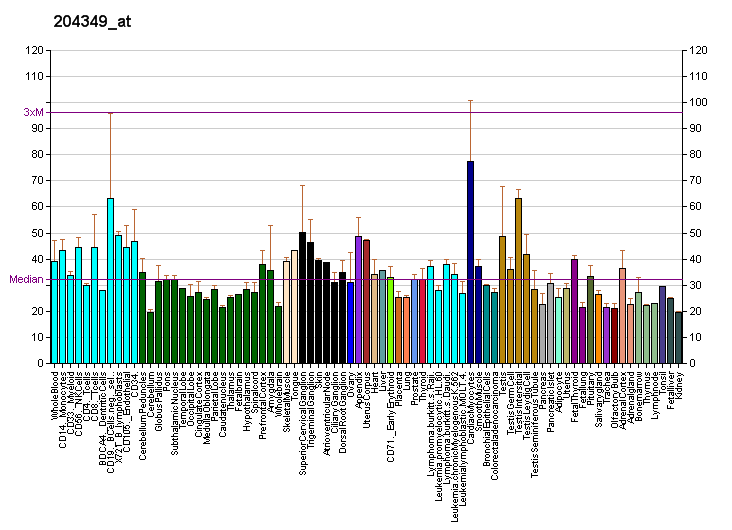
RNA expression pattern
Bgee	Human / Mouse (ortholog); Top expressed in: Epithelium of choroid plexus; sperm; germinal epithelium; endothelial cell; Achilles tendon; palpebral conjunctiva; kidney tubule; corpus epididymis; testicle; gonad / Top expressed in: medullary collecting duct; secondary oocyte; renal corpuscle; lens; primary oocyte; atrioventricular valve; seminiferous tubule; tail of embryo; medial ganglionic eminence; maxillary prominence; More reference expression data
BioGPS	More reference expression data
Gene ontology
Molecular function	transcription coactivator activity; transcription coregulator activity; protein binding; ubiquitin protein ligase activity
Cellular component	mediator complex; nucleus; transcription regulator complex; nucleoplasm; ubiquitin ligase complex; nuclear body
Biological process	regulation of transcription by RNA polymerase II; stem cell population maintenance; transcription initiation from RNA polymerase II promoter; regulation of transcription, DNA-templated; protein ubiquitination; transcription, DNA-templated; positive regulation of nucleic acid-templated transcription
Sources:Amigo / QuickGO
Orthologs
Databases	NCBI: entry; OMA: entry
Species	Human	Mouse
Entrez	9443	66213
Ensembl	ENSG00000155868	ENSMUSG00000020397
UniProt	O43513	Q9CZB6
RefSeq (mRNA)	NM_004270; NM_001100816	NM_001104530; NM_001104556; NM_001104557; NM_025426
RefSeq (protein)	NP_001094286; NP_004261	NP_001098000; NP_001098026; NP_001098027; NP_079702
Location (UCSC)	Chr 5: 157.14 – 157.16 Mb	Chr 11: 46.33 – 46.33 Mb
PubMed search
- Wikidata
View/Edit Human	View/Edit Mouse

Mediator of RNA polymerase II transcription subunit 7 is an enzyme that in humans is encoded by the MED7 gene.

The activation of gene transcription is a multistep process that is triggered by factors that recognize transcriptional enhancer sites in DNA. These factors work with co-activators to direct transcriptional initiation by the RNA polymerase II apparatus. The protein encoded by this gene is a subunit of the CRSP (cofactor required for SP1 activation) complex, which, along with TFIID, is required for efficient activation by SP1. This protein is also a component of other multisubunit complexes e.g. thyroid hormone receptor-(TR-) associated proteins which interact with TR and facilitate TR function on DNA templates in conjunction with initiation factors and cofactors.
