= CCHCR1 =

Protein found in humans

Identifiers
- Aliases: CCHCR1, C6orf18, HCR, SBP, coiled-coil alpha-helical rod protein 1, pg8
- External IDs: OMIM: 605310; MGI: 2385321; HomoloGene: 10396; GeneCards: CCHCR1; OMA:CCHCR1 - orthologs

Gene location (Human)
Chr.	Chromosome 6 (human)
Band	6p21.33	Start	31,142,439 bp
Band	6p21.33	End	31,158,238 bp

Gene location (Mouse)
Chr.	Chromosome 17 (mouse)
Band	17|17 B1	Start	35,827,997 bp
Band	17|17 B1	End	35,841,912 bp
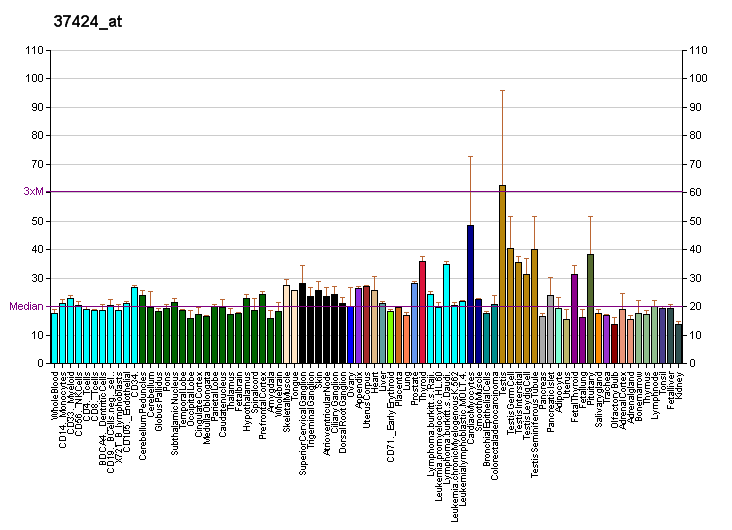

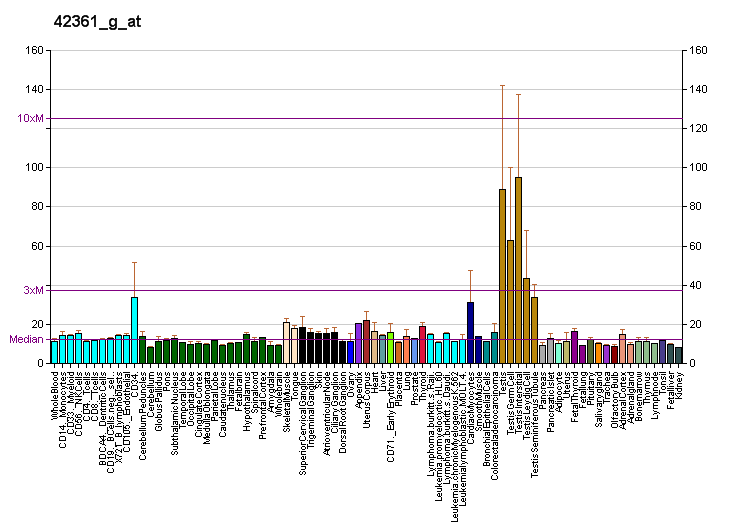

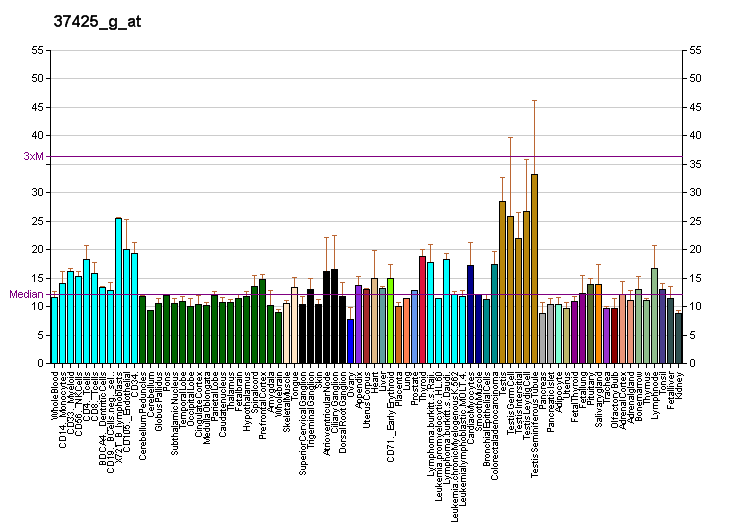
RNA expression pattern
Bgee	Human / Mouse (ortholog); Top expressed in: left testis; right testis; right uterine tube; sural nerve; mucosa of transverse colon; apex of heart; right hemisphere of cerebellum; duodenum; canal of the cervix; right lobe of thyroid gland / Top expressed in: spermatocyte; spermatid; seminiferous tubule; otic vesicle; ventricular zone; lip; yolk sac; gastrula; tail of embryo; genital tubercle; More reference expression data
BioGPS	More reference expression data
Gene ontology
Molecular function	protein binding; identical protein binding
Cellular component	centriole; nucleus; cytoplasm; cytosol
Biological process	multicellular organism development; cell differentiation; protein export from nucleus
Sources:Amigo / QuickGO
Orthologs
Species	Human	Mouse
Entrez	54535	240084
Ensembl	ENSG00000204536; ENSG00000206355; ENSG00000224180; ENSG00000206457; ENSG00000223533 ENSG00000234114	ENSMUSG00000040312
UniProt	Q8TD31	Q8K2I2
RefSeq (mRNA)	NM_001105563; NM_001105564; NM_019052; NM_001394641; NM_001394642 NM_001394643; NM_001394644; NM_001394646; NM_001394647; NM_001394648; NM_001394649; NM_001394645	NM_146248; NM_001372297; NM_001372298; NM_001372299; NM_001372300
RefSeq (protein)	NP_001099033; NP_001099034; NP_061925	NP_666360; NP_001359226; NP_001359227; NP_001359228; NP_001359229
Location (UCSC)	Chr 6: 31.14 – 31.16 Mb	Chr 17: 35.83 – 35.84 Mb
PubMed search
- Wikidata
View/Edit Human	View/Edit Mouse

Coiled-coil alpha-helical rod protein 1, also known as CCHCR1, is a protein which in humans is encoded by the CCHCR1 gene.

== Gene ==
The Human CCHCR1 gene is located at 6p21.33. It is also known as Coiled-Coil Alphahelical Rod Protein 1, C6orf18, Putative Gene 8 Protein, SBP, HCR (A-Helix Coiled-Coil Rod Homologue), pg8, StAR-Binding Protein, and Pg8.

== Homology ==
Homologes for CCHCR1 are conserved through tetrapods.

=== Orthologs ===
CCHCR1 has orthologs throughout vertebrates.

=== Phylogeny ===
Phylogenetic analysis with ClustalW indicated that CCHCR1

The CCHCR1 gene has

== Protein ==
=== Structure ===
The structure of CCHCR1 is primarily composed of alpha-helices, coils, and a small amount of beta sheets, according to PELE.

== Function ==
May be a regulator of keratinocyte proliferation or differentiation.

== Interacting Proteins ==
CCHCR1 has been shown to interact with POLR2C, KRT17 , TOP3B, Steroidogenic acute regulatory protein, TRAF4, HLA-C, TCF19, SNX29, EEF1D, and EEF1B2.

== Clinical significance ==
In genetically engineered mice, certain CCHCR1 polymorphisms cause upregulation of the expression of cytokeratins 6 (KRT6A), 16 (KRT16) and 17 (KRT17) and change in expression in other genes associated with terminal differentiation and formation of the cornified cell envelope. These CCHCR1 polymorphisms may therefore be associated with a susceptibility to psoriasis. Defective functioning of CCHCR1 may lead to abnormal keratinocyte proliferation which is a key feature of psoriasis.

CCHCR1 polymorphisms have also been found to be associated with multiple sclerosis.

== See also ==
- Coiled coil
