= Protein AATF =

Protein-coding gene in the species Homo sapiens

AATF

Identifiers
- Aliases: AATF, BFR2, CHE-1, CHE1, DED, Apoptosis-antagonizing transcription factor, apoptosis antagonizing transcription factor
- External IDs: OMIM: 608463; MGI: 1929608; GeneCards: AATF

Gene location (Human)
Chr.	Chromosome 17 (human)
Band	17q12	Start	36,948,925 bp
Band	17q12	End	37,056,871 bp

Gene location (Mouse)
Chr.	Chromosome 11 (mouse)
Band	11|11 C	Start	84,422,855 bp
Band	11|11 C	End	84,513,522 bp
RNA expression pattern
Bgee	Human / Mouse (ortholog); Top expressed in: monocyte; granulocyte; corpus callosum; Achilles tendon; tibial arteries; blood; skin of leg; bone marrow; body of pancreas; sural nerve / Top expressed in: morula; epiblast; embryo; tail of embryo; genital tubercle; primary oocyte; yolk sac; endothelial cell of lymphatic vessel; spermatocyte; embryo; More reference expression data
BioGPS	n/a
Gene ontology
Molecular function	protein domain specific binding; DNA-binding transcription factor activity; leucine zipper domain binding; protein binding; tau protein binding; RNA binding; protein kinase binding
Cellular component	cytoplasm; Golgi apparatus; nucleus; nucleolus
Biological process	embryonic cleavage; ribosome biogenesis; negative regulation of apoptotic process; cellular response to DNA damage stimulus; positive regulation of transcription, DNA-templated; cell adhesion; negative regulation of amyloid precursor protein biosynthetic process; regulation of mitotic cell cycle; negative regulation of superoxide anion generation; negative regulation of reactive oxygen species metabolic process; positive regulation of transcription by RNA polymerase II
Sources:Amigo / QuickGO
Orthologs
Databases	NCBI: entry; OMA: entry
Species	Human	Mouse
Entrez	26574	56321
Ensembl	ENSG00000275700; ENSG00000276072	ENSMUSG00000018697
UniProt	Q9NY61	Q9JKX4
RefSeq (mRNA)	NM_012138	NM_019816
RefSeq (protein)	NP_036270	NP_062790
Location (UCSC)	Chr 17: 36.95 – 37.06 Mb	Chr 11: 84.42 – 84.51 Mb
PubMed search
- Wikidata
View/Edit Human	View/Edit Mouse

Protein AATF, also known as apoptosis-antagonizing transcription factor, is a protein that in humans is encoded by the AATF gene.

== Function ==
The protein encoded by this gene was identified on the basis of its interaction with MAP3K12/DLK, a protein kinase known to be involved in the induction of cell apoptosis. This gene product contains a leucine zipper, which is a characteristic motif of transcription factors, and was shown to exhibit strong transactivation activity when fused to Gal4 DNA binding domain. Overexpression of this gene interfered with MAP3K12 induced apoptosis.

== Interactions ==
Protein AATF has been shown to interact with:

- PAWR,
- POLR2J,
- Retinoblastoma protein, and
- Transcription factor Sp1.
