= ZNF74 =

Protein-coding gene in the species Homo sapiens

Identifiers
- Aliases: ZNF74, COS52, ZFP520, ZNF520, hZNF7, zinc finger protein 74
- External IDs: OMIM: 194548; GeneCards: ZNF74

Gene location (Human)
Chr.	Chromosome 22 (human)
Band	22q11.21	Start	20,394,115 bp
Band	22q11.21	End	20,408,461 bp
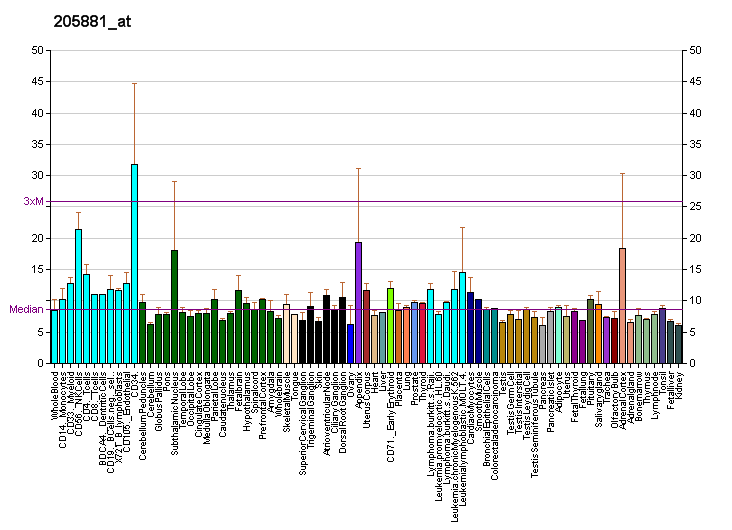
RNA expression pattern
Bgee	Human / Mouse (ortholog); Top expressed in: ganglionic eminence; gonad; ventricular zone; buccal mucosa cell; stromal cell of endometrium; granulocyte; prefrontal cortex; right hemisphere of cerebellum; right frontal lobe; anterior cingulate cortex / n/a; More reference expression data
BioGPS	More reference expression data
Gene ontology
Molecular function	DNA-binding transcription factor activity; nucleic acid binding; DNA binding; metal ion binding; RNA binding; DNA-binding transcription factor activity, RNA polymerase II-specific
Cellular component	intracellular anatomical structure; nucleus; nucleoplasm; actin cytoskeleton
Biological process	multicellular organism development; transcription, DNA-templated; regulation of transcription, DNA-templated; regulation of transcription by RNA polymerase II
Sources:Amigo / QuickGO
Orthologs
Databases	NCBI: entry; OMA: entry
Species	Human	Mouse
Entrez	7625	n/a
Ensembl	ENSG00000185252	n/a
UniProt	Q16587	n/a
RefSeq (mRNA)	NM_001256523; NM_001256524; NM_001256525; NM_003426	n/a
RefSeq (protein)	NP_001243452; NP_001243453; NP_001243454; NP_003417	n/a
Location (UCSC)	Chr 22: 20.39 – 20.41 Mb	n/a
PubMed search		n/a
- Wikidata
View/Edit Human

Zinc finger protein 74 is a protein that in humans is encoded by the ZNF74 gene. Schizophrenia susceptibility has been associated with a mutation in this protein.

== Interactions ==
ZNF74 has been shown to interact with POLR2A.
