= POLR2I =

Protein-coding gene in the species Homo sapiens

Identifiers
- Aliases: POLR2I, RPB9, hRPB14.5, polymerase (RNA) II subunit I, RNA polymerase II subunit I
- External IDs: OMIM: 180662; MGI: 1917170; GeneCards: POLR2I
Available structures
PDB	Ortholog search: PDBe RCSB
PDB	List of PDB id codes 5IYD, 5IY8, 5IY6, 5IYA, 5IYC, 5IY7, 5IY9, 5IYB

Gene location (Human)
Chr.	Chromosome 19 (human)
Band	19q13.12	Start	36,113,709 bp
Band	19q13.12	End	36,115,213 bp

Gene location (Mouse)
Chr.	Chromosome 7 (mouse)
Band	7|7 B1	Start	29,931,373 bp
Band	7|7 B1	End	29,932,815 bp
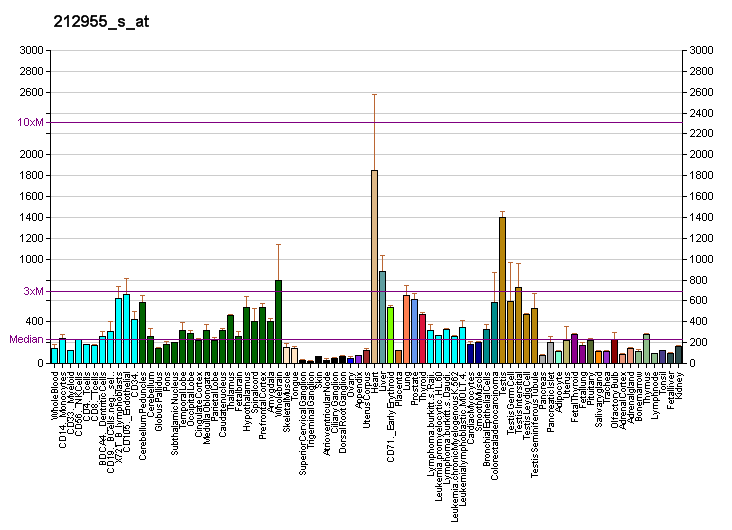
RNA expression pattern
Bgee	Human / Mouse (ortholog); Top expressed in: left testis; right testis; muscle of thigh; C1 segment; apex of heart; nucleus accumbens; right frontal lobe; amygdala; right hemisphere of cerebellum; putamen / Top expressed in: internal carotid artery; medial ganglionic eminence; external carotid artery; triceps brachii muscle; sternocleidomastoid muscle; fossa; condyle; right kidney; embryo; neural tube; More reference expression data
BioGPS	More reference expression data
Gene ontology
Molecular function	zinc ion binding; metal ion binding; nucleic acid binding; DNA-directed 5'-3' RNA polymerase activity
Cellular component	nucleolus; RNA polymerase II, core complex; nucleus; nucleoplasm
Biological process	mRNA splicing, via spliceosome; transcription elongation from RNA polymerase II promoter; 7-methylguanosine mRNA capping; transcription by RNA polymerase II; snRNA transcription by RNA polymerase II; fibroblast growth factor receptor signaling pathway; mRNA cleavage; RNA metabolic process; regulation of gene silencing by miRNA; maintenance of transcriptional fidelity during DNA-templated transcription elongation from RNA polymerase II promoter; transcription-coupled nucleotide-excision repair; transcription initiation from RNA polymerase II promoter; transcription, DNA-templated; somatic stem cell population maintenance; positive regulation of viral transcription
Sources:Amigo / QuickGO
Orthologs
Databases	NCBI: entry; OMA: entry
Species	Human	Mouse
Entrez	5438	69920
Ensembl	ENSG00000105258	ENSMUSG00000019738
UniProt	P36954	P60898
RefSeq (mRNA)	NM_006233	NM_027259
RefSeq (protein)	NP_006224	NP_081535
Location (UCSC)	Chr 19: 36.11 – 36.12 Mb	Chr 7: 29.93 – 29.93 Mb
PubMed search
- Wikidata
View/Edit Human	View/Edit Mouse

DNA-directed RNA polymerase II subunit RPB9 is an enzyme that in humans is encoded by the POLR2I gene.

This gene encodes a subunit of RNA polymerase II, the polymerase responsible for synthesizing messenger RNA in eukaryotes. This subunit, in combination with two other polymerase subunits, forms the DNA binding domain of the polymerase, a groove in which the DNA template is transcribed into RNA. The product of this gene has two zinc finger motifs with conserved cysteines and the subunit does possess zinc binding activity.
