= POLR2J2 =

Protein-coding gene in the species Homo sapiens

Identifiers
- Aliases: POLR2J2, polymerase (RNA) II (DNA directed) polypeptide J2, HRPB11B, RPB11b1, polymerase (RNA) II subunit J2, RNA polymerase II subunit J2, RPB11b2, POLR2J3
- External IDs: OMIM: 609881; GeneCards: POLR2J2

Gene location (Human)
Chr.	Chromosome 7 (human)
Band	7q22.1	Start	102,665,368 bp
Band	7q22.1	End	102,671,629 bp
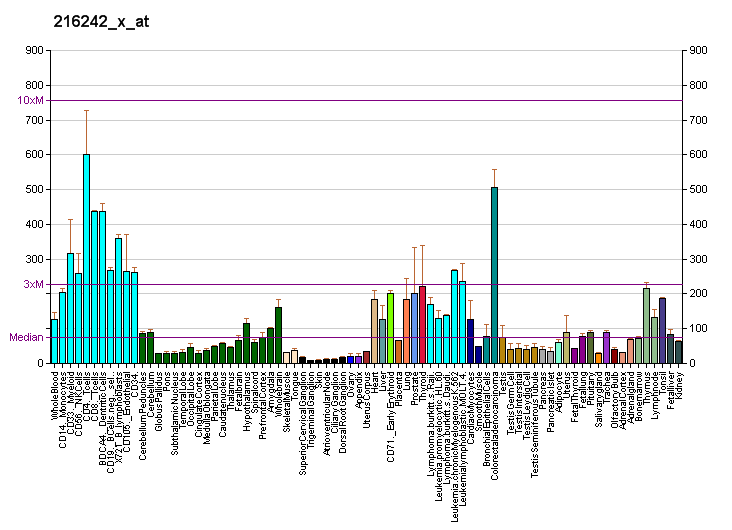
RNA expression pattern
Bgee	Human / Mouse (ortholog); Top expressed in: testicle; gonad; blood; stromal cell of endometrium; mucosa of transverse colon; sural nerve; monocyte; bone marrow cell; granulocyte; spleen / n/a; More reference expression data
BioGPS	More reference expression data
Gene ontology
Molecular function	DNA-directed 5'-3' RNA polymerase activity; DNA binding; protein dimerization activity; RNA polymerase II activity
Cellular component	nucleus; RNA polymerase II, core complex
Biological process	transcription, DNA-templated; transcription by RNA polymerase II
Sources:Amigo / QuickGO
Orthologs
Databases	NCBI: entry; OMA: entry
Species	Human	Mouse
Entrez	246721	n/a
Ensembl	ENSG00000228049	n/a
UniProt	Q9GZM3	n/a
RefSeq (mRNA)	NM_145325; NM_032958; NM_032959	n/a
RefSeq (protein)	NP_001091084; NP_116581	n/a
Location (UCSC)	Chr 7: 102.67 – 102.67 Mb	n/a
PubMed search		n/a
- Wikidata
View/Edit Human

DNA directed RNA polymerase II polypeptide J-related gene, also known as POLR2J2, is a human gene.

This gene is a member of the RNA polymerase II subunit 11 gene family, which includes three genes in a cluster on chromosome 7q22.1 and a pseudogene on chromosome 7p13. The founding member of this family, DNA directed RNA polymerase II polypeptide J, has been shown to encode a subunit of RNA polymerase II, the polymerase responsible for synthesizing messenger RNA in eukaryotes. This locus produces multiple, alternatively spliced transcripts that potentially express isoforms with distinct C-termini compared to DNA directed RNA polymerase II polypeptide J.

Most or all variants are spliced to include additional non-coding exons at the 3' end which makes them candidates for nonsense-mediated decay (NMD). Consequently, it is not known if this locus expresses a protein or proteins in vivo.
