= POLR2F =

Protein-coding gene in the species Homo sapiens

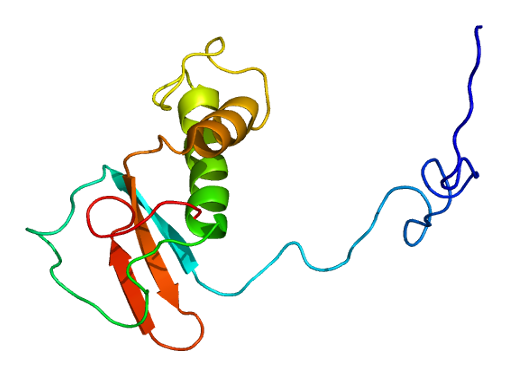

Identifiers
- Aliases: POLR2F, HRBP14.4, POLRF, RPABC14.4, RPABC2, RPB14.4, RPC15, polymerase (RNA) II subunit F, RNA polymerase II subunit F, RNA polymerase II, I and III subunit F, RPB6 homolog
- External IDs: OMIM: 604414; MGI: 1349393; GeneCards: POLR2F
Available structures
PDB	Ortholog search: PDBe RCSB
PDB	List of PDB id codes 1QKL, 5FLM, 5IY9, 5IYA, 5IYC, 5IYB, 5IY7, 5IY8, 5IYD, 5IY6

Gene location (Human)
Chr.	Chromosome 22 (human)
Band	22q13.1	Start	37,952,607 bp
Band	22q13.1	End	38,041,915 bp

Gene location (Mouse)
Chr.	Chromosome 15 (mouse)
Band	15 E1|15 37.7 cM	Start	79,025,209 bp
Band	15 E1|15 37.7 cM	End	79,035,974 bp
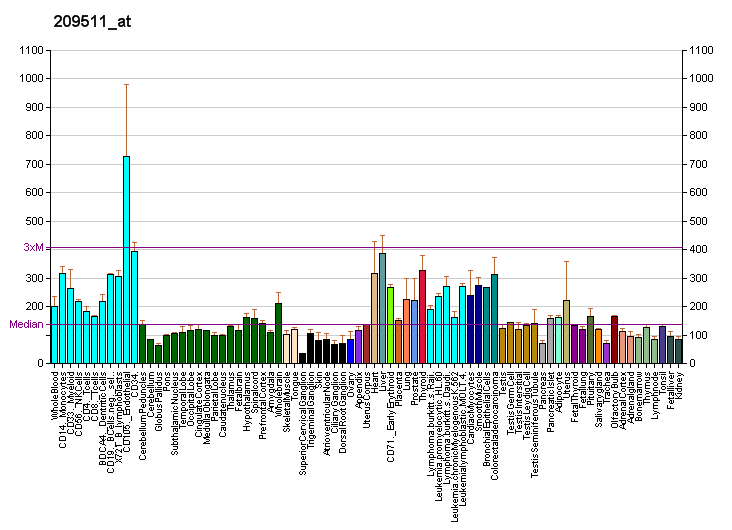
RNA expression pattern
Bgee	Human / Mouse (ortholog); Top expressed in: C1 segment; tibial nerve; tendon of biceps brachii; apex of heart; right lobe of liver; right auricle of heart; amygdala; left ventricle; anterior pituitary; ganglionic eminence / Top expressed in: yolk sac; morula; morula; otic vesicle; medial ganglionic eminence; endothelial cell of lymphatic vessel; embryo; embryo; ventricular zone; vestibular membrane of cochlear duct; More reference expression data
BioGPS	More reference expression data
Gene ontology
Molecular function	DNA binding; RNA polymerase II activity; RNA polymerase III activity; DNA-directed 5'-3' RNA polymerase activity; RNA polymerase I activity
Cellular component	cytosol; nucleoplasm; RNA polymerase I complex; RNA polymerase III complex; RNA polymerase II, core complex; nucleus; fibrillar center
Biological process	termination of RNA polymerase I transcription; mRNA splicing, via spliceosome; epigenetic maintenance of chromatin in transcription-competent conformation; transcription initiation from RNA polymerase I promoter; transcription elongation from RNA polymerase II promoter; 7-methylguanosine mRNA capping; transcription by RNA polymerase II; transcription-coupled nucleotide-excision repair; transcription initiation from RNA polymerase II promoter; snRNA transcription by RNA polymerase II; fibroblast growth factor receptor signaling pathway; transcription by RNA polymerase III; RNA metabolic process; regulation of gene silencing by miRNA; transcription, DNA-templated; transcription elongation from RNA polymerase I promoter; positive regulation of type I interferon production; somatic stem cell population maintenance; positive regulation of viral transcription
Sources:Amigo / QuickGO
Orthologs
Databases	NCBI: entry; OMA: entry
Species	Human	Mouse
Entrez	5435	69833
Ensembl	ENSG00000100142	ENSMUSG00000033020
UniProt	P61218	P61219
RefSeq (mRNA)	NM_001301129; NM_001301130; NM_001301131; NM_021974; NM_001363825	NM_027231
RefSeq (protein)	NP_001288058; NP_001288059; NP_001288060; NP_068809; NP_001350754	NP_081507
Location (UCSC)	Chr 22: 37.95 – 38.04 Mb	Chr 15: 79.03 – 79.04 Mb
PubMed search
- Wikidata
View/Edit Human	View/Edit Mouse

DNA-directed RNA polymerases I, II, and III subunit RPABC2 is a protein that in humans is encoded by the POLR2F gene.

This gene encodes the sixth largest subunit of RNA polymerase II, the polymerase responsible for synthesizing messenger RNA in eukaryotes, that is also shared by the other two DNA-directed RNA polymerases. In yeast, this polymerase subunit, in combination with at least two other subunits, forms a structure that stabilizes the transcribing polymerase on the DNA template.

== Interactions ==
POLR2F has been shown to interact with POLR2C.

== See also ==
- RNA polymerase II
