= GTF2F1 =

Protein-coding gene in the species Homo sapiens

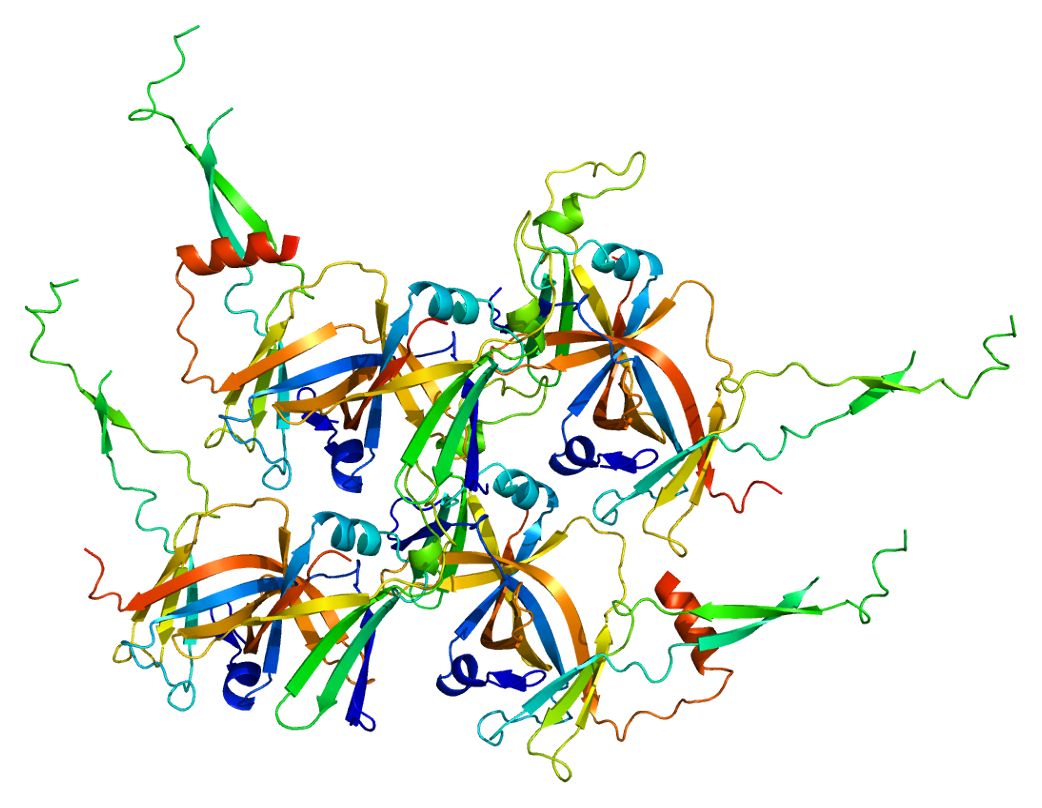

Identifiers
- Aliases: GTF2F1, general transcription factor IIF, polypeptide 1, 74kDa, BTF4, RAP74, TF2F1, TFIIF, general transcription factor IIF subunit 1
- External IDs: OMIM: 189968; MGI: 1923848; GeneCards: GTF2F1
Available structures
PDB	Ortholog search: PDBe RCSB
PDB	List of PDB id codes 1F3U, 1I27, 1J2X, 1NHA, 1ONV, 2K7L, 5IY9, 5IYA, 5IYC, 5IYB, 5IY7, 5IY8, 5IYD, 5IY6

Gene location (Human)
Chr.	Chromosome 19 (human)
Band	19p13.3	Start	6,379,572 bp
Band	19p13.3	End	6,393,981 bp

Gene location (Mouse)
Chr.	Chromosome 17 (mouse)
Band	17|17 D	Start	57,310,405 bp
Band	17|17 D	End	57,318,288 bp
RNA expression pattern
Bgee	Human / Mouse (ortholog); Top expressed in: cerebellum; cerebellar cortex; cerebellar hemisphere; left testis; right hemisphere of cerebellum; right testis; left ovary; prefrontal cortex; anterior pituitary; superior frontal gyrus / Top expressed in: saccule; otic placode; otic vesicle; seminiferous tubule; neural layer of retina; tail of embryo; primitive streak; primary oocyte; yolk sac; genital tubercle; More reference expression data
BioGPS	n/a
Gene ontology
Molecular function	DNA binding; transcription coactivator activity; transcription factor binding; protein binding; phosphatase activator activity; RNA binding; protein phosphatase binding; protein domain specific binding; RNA polymerase II general transcription initiation factor activity; promoter-specific chromatin binding
Cellular component	intracellular membrane-bounded organelle; nucleoplasm; transcription factor TFIIF complex; cell junction; transcription factor TFIID complex; nucleus; protein-containing complex
Biological process	mRNA splicing, via spliceosome; regulation of transcription, DNA-templated; transcription elongation from RNA polymerase II promoter; response to virus; 7-methylguanosine mRNA capping; transcription by RNA polymerase II; transcription, DNA-templated; positive regulation of viral transcription; transcription initiation from RNA polymerase II promoter; positive regulation of transcription elongation from RNA polymerase II promoter; positive regulation of transcription by RNA polymerase II; snRNA transcription by RNA polymerase II; fibroblast growth factor receptor signaling pathway; positive regulation of catalytic activity; RNA metabolic process; negative regulation of protein binding
Sources:Amigo / QuickGO
Orthologs
Databases	NCBI: entry; OMA: entry
Species	Human	Mouse
Entrez	2962	98053
Ensembl	ENSG00000125651	ENSMUSG00000002658
UniProt	P35269	Q3THK3
RefSeq (mRNA)	NM_002096	NM_133801
RefSeq (protein)	NP_002087	NP_598562
Location (UCSC)	Chr 19: 6.38 – 6.39 Mb	Chr 17: 57.31 – 57.32 Mb
PubMed search
- Wikidata
View/Edit Human	View/Edit Mouse

General transcription factor IIF subunit 1 is a protein that in humans is encoded by the GTF2F1 gene.

== Interactions ==
GTF2F1 has been shown to interact with:

- CTDP1,
- GTF2H4,
- HNRPU,
- MED21,
- POLR2A,
- Serum response factor
- TAF11,
- TAF1,
- TATA binding protein, and
- Transcription Factor II B.

== See also ==
- Transcription factor II F
