= GTF2F2 =

Protein-coding gene in the species Homo sapiens

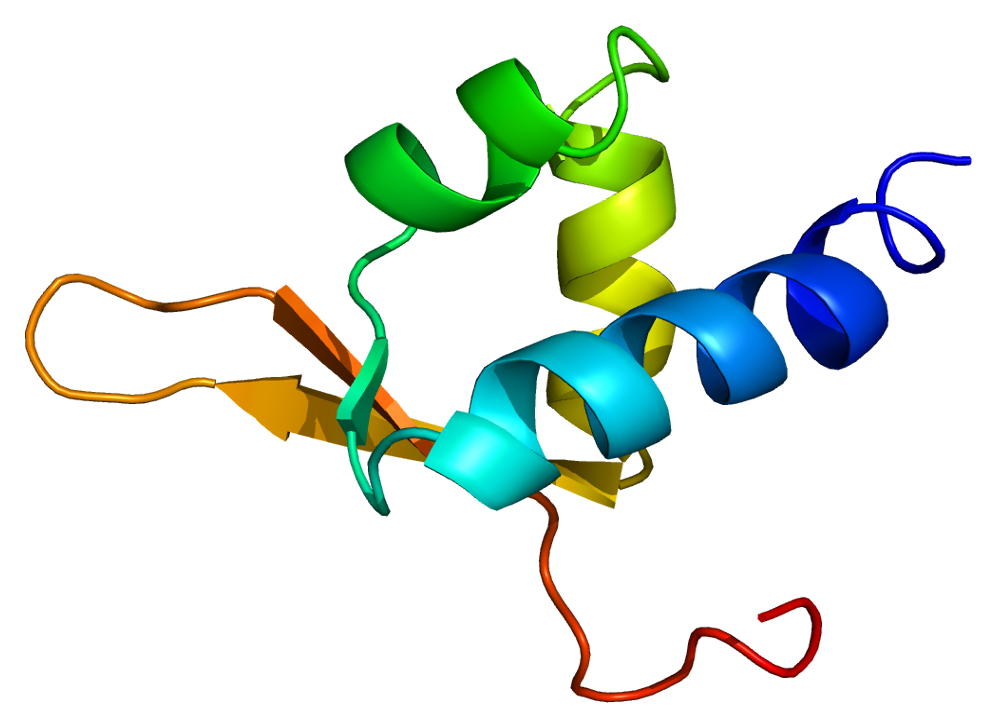

Identifiers
- Aliases: GTF2F2, BTF4, RAP30, TF2F2, TFIIF, general transcription factor IIF subunit 2
- External IDs: OMIM: 189969; MGI: 1915955; GeneCards: GTF2F2
Available structures
PDB	Ortholog search: PDBe RCSB
PDB	List of PDB id codes 1BBY, 1F3U, 2BBY, 5IY9, 5IYA, 5IYC, 5IYB, 5IY7, 5IY8, 5IYD, 5IY6

Gene location (Human)
Chr.	Chromosome 13 (human)
Band	13q14.12-q14.13	Start	45,120,510 bp
Band	13q14.12-q14.13	End	45,284,893 bp

Gene location (Mouse)
Chr.	Chromosome 14 (mouse)
Band	14|14 D3	Start	76,134,377 bp
Band	14|14 D3	End	76,248,305 bp
RNA expression pattern
Bgee	Human / Mouse (ortholog); Top expressed in: gonad; ventricular zone; ganglionic eminence; Achilles tendon; muscle of thigh; skin of abdomen; testicle; skin of leg; Skeletal muscle tissue of biceps brachii; gastrocnemius muscle / Top expressed in: embryo; morula; morula; epiblast; embryo; uterus; lens; zygote; spermatid; cervix; More reference expression data
BioGPS	n/a
Gene ontology
Molecular function	DNA binding; nucleotide binding; helicase activity; protein binding; hydrolase activity; ATP binding
Cellular component	microtubule cytoskeleton; nucleoplasm; transcription factor TFIIF complex; nucleus; transcription preinitiation complex
Biological process	mRNA splicing, via spliceosome; regulation of transcription, DNA-templated; transcription elongation from RNA polymerase II promoter; 7-methylguanosine mRNA capping; transcription by RNA polymerase II; positive regulation of transcription initiation from RNA polymerase II promoter; transcription, DNA-templated; positive regulation of viral transcription; transcription initiation from RNA polymerase II promoter; snRNA transcription by RNA polymerase II; fibroblast growth factor receptor signaling pathway; positive regulation of transcription elongation from RNA polymerase II promoter; RNA metabolic process; positive regulation of transcription by RNA polymerase II
Sources:Amigo / QuickGO
Orthologs
Databases	NCBI: entry; OMA: entry
Species	Human	Mouse
Entrez	2963	68705
Ensembl	ENSG00000188342	ENSMUSG00000067995
UniProt	P13984	Q8R0A0
RefSeq (mRNA)	NM_004128	NM_026816
RefSeq (protein)	NP_004119	NP_081092
Location (UCSC)	Chr 13: 45.12 – 45.28 Mb	Chr 14: 76.13 – 76.25 Mb
PubMed search
- Wikidata
View/Edit Human	View/Edit Mouse

General transcription factor IIF subunit 2 is a protein that in humans is encoded by the GTF2F2 gene.

== Interactions ==
GTF2F2 has been shown to interact with POLR2E and HTATSF1.

== See also ==
- Transcription Factor II F
