= POLR2C =

Protein-coding gene in humans

Identifiers
- Aliases: POLR2C, RPB3, RPB31, hRPB33, hsRPB3, polymerase (RNA) II subunit C, RNA polymerase II subunit C
- External IDs: OMIM: 180663; MGI: 109299; GeneCards: POLR2C
Available structures
PDB	Ortholog search: PDBe RCSB
PDB	List of PDB id codes 5IYC, 5IY6, 5IYD, 5IY8, 5IY7, 5IY9, 5IYA, 5IYB,%%s5IYD, 5IY8, 5IYC, 5IY6, 5IY7, 5IYA, 5IY9, 5IYB

Gene location (Human)
Chr.	Chromosome 16 (human)
Band	16q21	Start	57,462,660 bp
Band	16q21	End	57,472,009 bp

Gene location (Mouse)
Chr.	Chromosome 8 (mouse)
Band	8|8 C5	Start	95,584,078 bp
Band	8|8 C5	End	95,600,163 bp
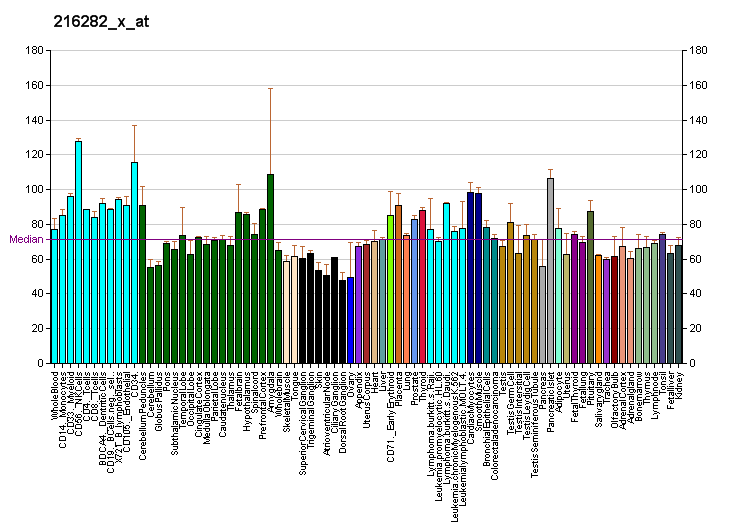

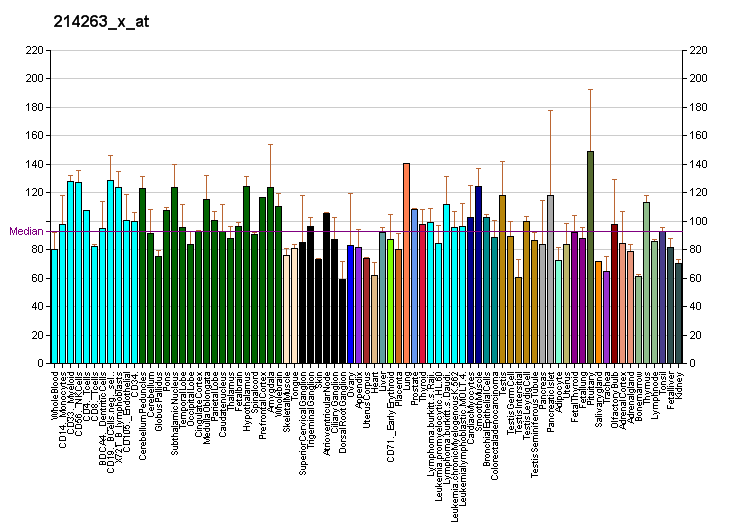

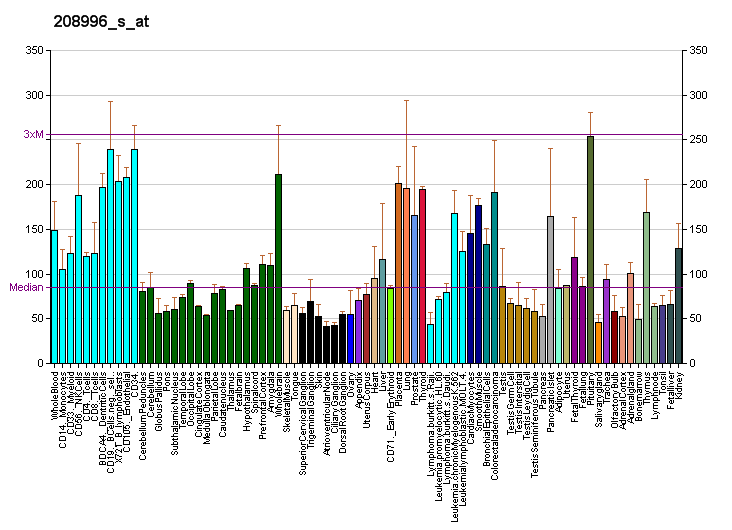
RNA expression pattern
Bgee	Human / Mouse (ortholog); Top expressed in: islet of Langerhans; secondary oocyte; anterior pituitary; ventricular zone; gastrocnemius muscle; left ovary; popliteal artery; tibial arteries; right ovary; Descending thoracic aorta / Top expressed in: epithelium of small intestine; intestinal villus; Ileal epithelium; embryo; yolk sac; embryo; ventricular zone; muscle of thigh; ganglionic eminence; neural tube; More reference expression data
BioGPS	More reference expression data
Gene ontology
Molecular function	DNA binding; protein dimerization activity; RNA polymerase II activity; DNA-directed 5'-3' RNA polymerase activity; protein binding
Cellular component	microtubule cytoskeleton; RNA polymerase II, core complex; nucleus; nucleoplasm; cytosol; cytoplasm
Biological process	mRNA splicing, via spliceosome; transcription elongation from RNA polymerase II promoter; 7-methylguanosine mRNA capping; transcription-coupled nucleotide-excision repair; transcription initiation from RNA polymerase II promoter; snRNA transcription by RNA polymerase II; fibroblast growth factor receptor signaling pathway; transcription by RNA polymerase II; RNA metabolic process; regulation of gene silencing by miRNA; transcription, DNA-templated; somatic stem cell population maintenance; positive regulation of viral transcription
Sources:Amigo / QuickGO
Orthologs
Databases	NCBI: entry; OMA: entry
Species	Human	Mouse
Entrez	5432	20021
Ensembl	ENSG00000102978	ENSMUSG00000031783
UniProt	P19387; Q6FGR6	P97760
RefSeq (mRNA)	NM_002694; NM_032940	NM_009090
RefSeq (protein)	NP_116558; NP_116558.1	NP_033116
Location (UCSC)	Chr 16: 57.46 – 57.47 Mb	Chr 8: 95.58 – 95.6 Mb
PubMed search
- Wikidata
View/Edit Human	View/Edit Mouse

DNA-directed RNA polymerase II subunit RPB3 is an enzyme that in humans is encoded by the POLR2C gene.

== Function ==
This gene encodes the third largest subunit of RNA polymerase II, the polymerase responsible for synthesizing messenger RNA in eukaryotes. The product of this gene contains a cysteine rich region and exists as a heterodimer with another polymerase subunit, POLR2J. These two subunits form a core subassembly unit of the polymerase. A pseudogene has been identified on chromosome 21.

== Interactions ==
POLR2C has been shown to interact with:

- ATF4,
- CCHCR1,
- Myogenin,
- POLR2A,
- POLR2B,
- POLR2E and
- POLR2F,
- POLR2G,
- POLR2H,
- POLR2J,
- POLR2K,
- POLR2L, and
- TAF15.
