= POLR2A =

Protein-coding gene in the species Homo sapiens

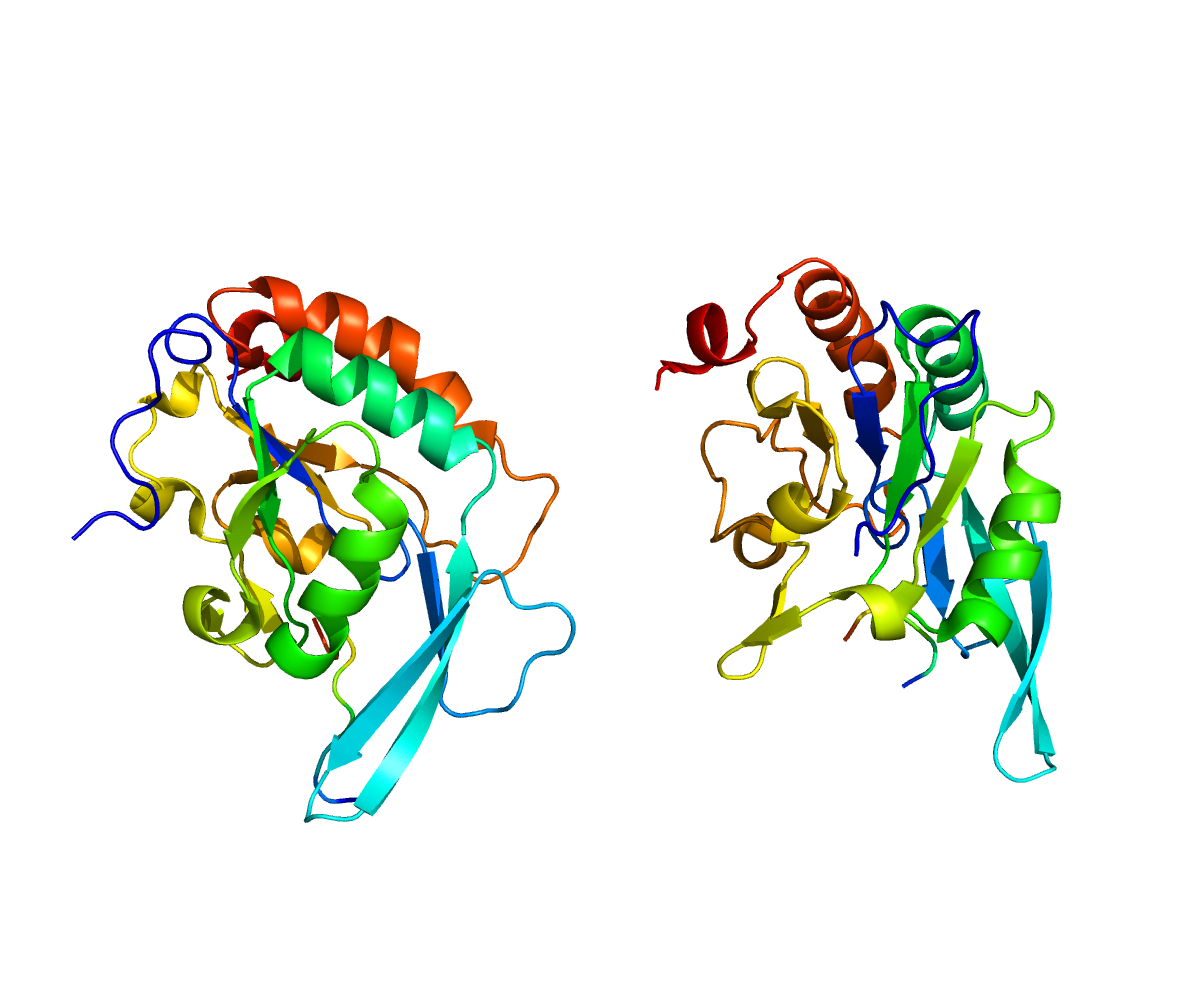

Identifiers
- Aliases: POLR2A, POLR2, POLRA, RPB1, RPBh1, RPO2, RPOL2, RpIILS, hRPB220, hsRPB1, polymerase (RNA) II subunit A, RNA polymerase II subunit A, NEDHIB
- External IDs: OMIM: 180660; MGI: 98086; GeneCards: POLR2A
Available structures
PDB	Ortholog search: PDBe RCSB
PDB	List of PDB id codes 2GHQ, 2GHT, 2LTO, 3D9K, 3D9L, 3D9M, 3D9N, 3D9O, 3D9P, 4JXT, 5IY9, 5IYA, 5IYC, 5IYB, 5IY7, 5IY8, 5IYD, 5IY6
Enzyme activity
EC #	BRENDA	ExPASy	KEGG	MetaCyc
2.7.7.6	↗	↗	↗	↗
2.7.7.48	↗	↗	↗	↗

Gene location (Human)
Chr.	Chromosome 17 (human)
Band	17p13.1	Start	7,484,366 bp
Band	17p13.1	End	7,514,616 bp

Gene location (Mouse)
Chr.	Chromosome 11 (mouse)
Band	11 B3|11 42.86 cM	Start	69,624,823 bp
Band	11 B3|11 42.86 cM	End	69,649,463 bp
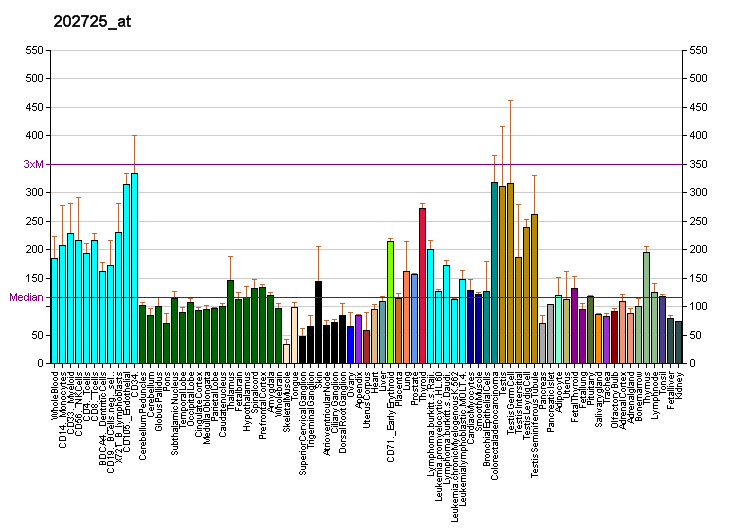

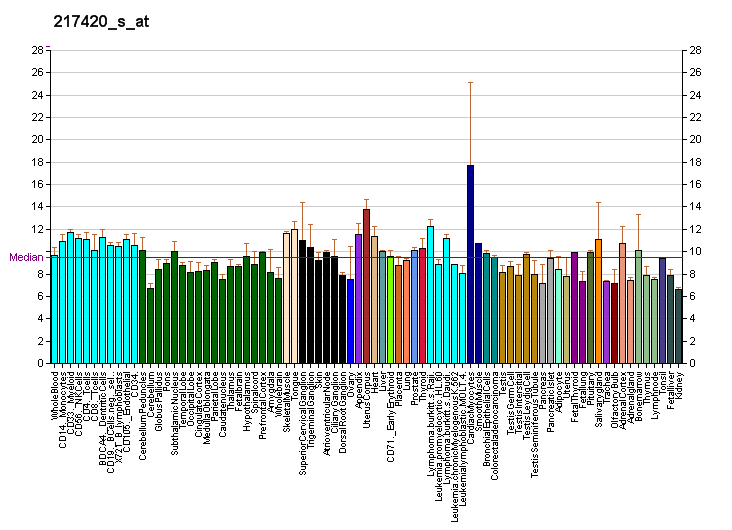
RNA expression pattern
Bgee	Human / Mouse (ortholog); Top expressed in: right testis; left testis; stromal cell of endometrium; mucosa of esophagus; skin of leg; right adrenal cortex; right uterine tube; pituitary gland; left adrenal gland; skin of abdomen / Top expressed in: neural layer of retina; tail of embryo; genital tubercle; epiblast; ventricular zone; internal carotid artery; Ileal epithelium; tracheobronchial tree; external carotid artery; perirhinal cortex; More reference expression data
BioGPS	More reference expression data
Gene ontology
Molecular function	transferase activity; DNA binding; nucleotidyltransferase activity; RNA polymerase II activity; metal ion binding; RNA-directed 5'-3' RNA polymerase activity; DNA-directed 5'-3' RNA polymerase activity; protein binding; ubiquitin protein ligase binding; RNA binding; protein C-terminus binding; promoter-specific chromatin binding
Cellular component	Prp19 complex; nucleolus; RNA polymerase II, core complex; nucleus; nucleoplasm; cytoplasm
Biological process	mRNA splicing, via spliceosome; regulation of transcription, DNA-templated; somatic stem cell population maintenance; DNA-templated transcription, termination; transcription elongation from RNA polymerase II promoter; 7-methylguanosine mRNA capping; transcription by RNA polymerase II; transcription, RNA-templated; positive regulation of RNA splicing; positive regulation of viral transcription; transcription-coupled nucleotide-excision repair; transcription initiation from RNA polymerase II promoter; snRNA transcription by RNA polymerase II; fibroblast growth factor receptor signaling pathway; transcription, DNA-templated; RNA metabolic process; regulation of gene silencing by miRNA
Sources:Amigo / QuickGO
Orthologs
Databases	NCBI: entry; OMA: entry
Species	Human	Mouse
Entrez	5430	20020
Ensembl	ENSG00000284832; ENSG00000181222	ENSMUSG00000005198
UniProt	P24928	P08775
RefSeq (mRNA)	NM_000937	NM_009089; NM_001291068
RefSeq (protein)	NP_000928	NP_001277997
Location (UCSC)	Chr 17: 7.48 – 7.51 Mb	Chr 11: 69.62 – 69.65 Mb
PubMed search
- Wikidata
View/Edit Human	View/Edit Mouse

DNA-directed RNA polymerase II subunit RPB1, also known as RPB1, is an enzyme that is encoded by the POLR2A gene in humans.

== Function ==
This gene encodes the largest subunit of RNA polymerase II, the polymerase responsible for synthesizing messenger RNA in eukaryotes. The product of this gene contains a carboxy terminal domain composed of heptapeptide repeats that are essential for polymerase activity. These repeats contain serine and threonine residues that are phosphorylated in actively transcribing RNA polymerase. In addition, this subunit, in combination with several other polymerase subunits, forms the DNA-binding domain of the polymerase, a groove in which the DNA template is transcribed into RNA.

== Interactions ==
POLR2A has been shown to interact with:

- BRCA1,
- CREBBP,
- CTDP1,
- CDK8,
- GTF2B,
- GTF2F1,
- GTF2H4,
- MED21,
- MED26,
- PCAF,
- POLR2C,
- POLR2E,
- POLR2H,
- POLR2L,
- PQBP1,
- SMARCA2,
- SMARCA4
- SMARCB1,
- SMYD3,
- SND1,
- SUPT5H,
- TAF11,
- TBP,
- TCEA1,
- TCERG1, and
- ZNF74.
