= HTATSF1 =

Protein-coding gene in the species Homo sapiens

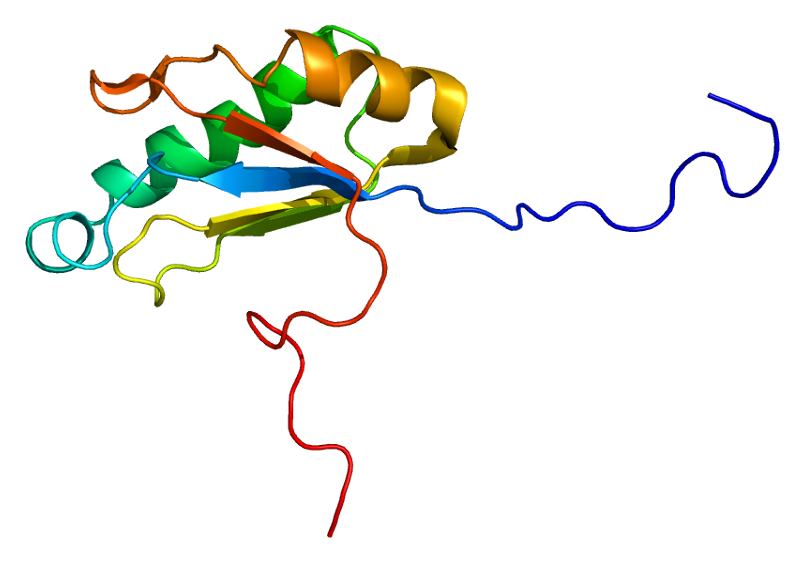

Identifiers
- Aliases: HTATSF1, TAT-SF1, TATSF1, dJ196E23.2, HIV-1 Tat specific factor 1
- External IDs: OMIM: 300346; MGI: 1919709; GeneCards: HTATSF1
Available structures
PDB	Ortholog search: PDBe RCSB
PDB	List of PDB id codes 2DIT

Gene location (Human)
Chr.	X chromosome (human)
Band	Xq26.3	Start	136,497,079 bp
Band	Xq26.3	End	136,512,346 bp

Gene location (Mouse)
Chr.	X chromosome (mouse)
Band	X|X A6	Start	56,098,943 bp
Band	X|X A6	End	56,112,543 bp
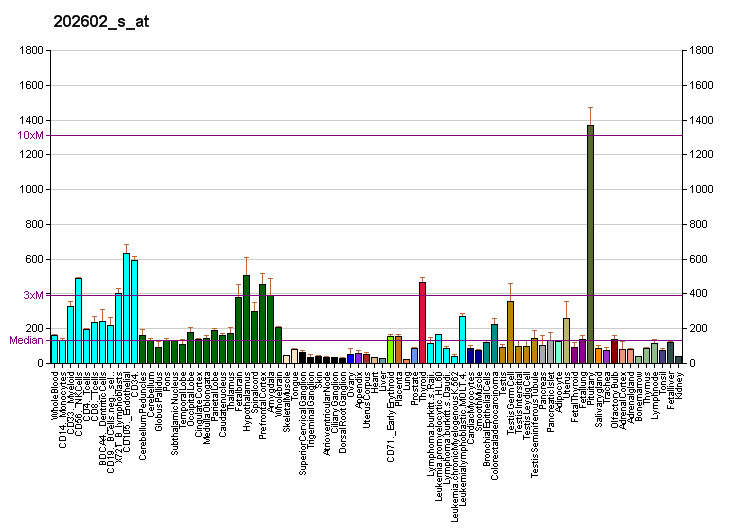

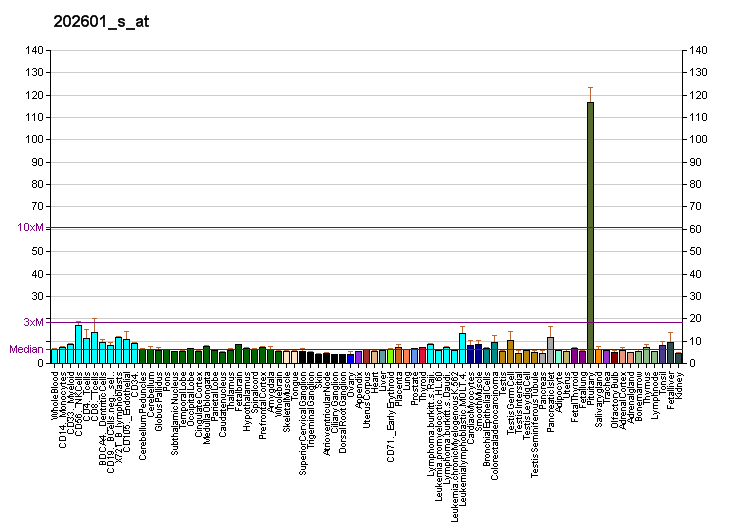
RNA expression pattern
Bgee	Human / Mouse (ortholog); Top expressed in: sural nerve; Skeletal muscle tissue of rectus abdominis; pituitary gland; germinal epithelium; internal globus pallidus; epithelium of nasopharynx; ganglionic eminence; tendon of biceps brachii; vastus lateralis muscle; anterior pituitary / Top expressed in: pituitary gland; saccule; vas deferens; fossa; condyle; otic vesicle; ankle; otic placode; triceps brachii muscle; temporal muscle; More reference expression data
BioGPS	More reference expression data
Gene ontology
Molecular function	nucleic acid binding; RNA binding
Cellular component	U2-type spliceosomal complex; nucleus; U2 snRNP; nucleoplasm
Biological process	regulation of transcription by RNA polymerase II; viral genome replication; regulation of DNA-templated transcription, elongation; regulation of transcription, DNA-templated; transcription, DNA-templated; mRNA splicing, via spliceosome
Sources:Amigo / QuickGO
Orthologs
Databases	NCBI: entry; OMA: entry
Species	Human	Mouse
Entrez	27336	72459
Ensembl	ENSG00000102241	ENSMUSG00000067873
UniProt	O43719	Q8BGC0
RefSeq (mRNA)	NM_001163280; NM_014500	NM_028242; NM_029371
RefSeq (protein)	NP_001156752; NP_055315	NP_082518; NP_083647
Location (UCSC)	Chr X: 136.5 – 136.51 Mb	Chr X: 56.1 – 56.11 Mb
PubMed search
- Wikidata
View/Edit Human	View/Edit Mouse

HIV Tat-specific factor 1 is a protein that in humans is encoded by the HTATSF1 gene.

== Function ==
Whereas most DNA sequence-specific transcription factors increase the rate of initiation and interact with enhancer or promoter DNA, human immunodeficiency virus-1 (HIV-1) Tat predominantly stimulates elongation and interacts with the trans-acting responsive (TAR) RNA element. Tat is essential for HIV replication.

HTATSF1 has also been shown to be involved in intron retention, and is associated with splicing of mRNAs that encode ribosomal proteins. It is also associated with a naïve pluripotent state, although the relationship is complex and is strongly affected by other pluripotency factors such as Nanog and KLF2.

== Interactions ==
HTATSF1 has been shown to interact with SUPT5H and GTF2F2.
