= TCF19 =

Protein-coding gene in the species Homo sapiens

Identifiers
- Aliases: TCF19, SC1, TCF-19, transcription factor 19
- External IDs: OMIM: 600912; MGI: 103180; GeneCards: TCF19

Gene location (Human)
Chr.	Chromosome 6 (human)
Band	6p21.33	Start	31,158,547 bp
Band	6p21.33	End	31,167,159 bp

Gene location (Mouse)
Chr.	Chromosome 17 (mouse)
Band	17|17 B1	Start	35,823,631 bp
Band	17|17 B1	End	35,827,721 bp
RNA expression pattern
Bgee	Human / Mouse (ortholog); Top expressed in: gonad; ventricular zone; lymph node; ganglionic eminence; mucosa of transverse colon; bone marrow; appendix; stromal cell of endometrium; mucosa of esophagus; bone marrow cell / Top expressed in: bone marrow; thymus; ventricular zone; genital tubercle; stomach; yolk sac; lip; intestine; duodenum; neural tube; More reference expression data
BioGPS	n/a
Gene ontology
Molecular function	DNA-binding transcription factor activity; metal ion binding; protein binding
Cellular component	nucleus
Biological process	transcription, DNA-templated; regulation of transcription by RNA polymerase II; cell population proliferation; regulation of transcription, DNA-templated
Sources:Amigo / QuickGO
Orthologs
Databases	NCBI: entry; OMA: entry
Species	Human	Mouse
Entrez	6941	106795
Ensembl	ENSG00000233890; ENSG00000224472; ENSG00000137310; ENSG00000224941; ENSG00000234674 ENSG00000206455; ENSG00000224379	ENSMUSG00000050410
UniProt	Q9Y242	Q99KJ5
RefSeq (mRNA)	NM_001077511; NM_007109; NM_001318908	NM_001163763; NM_001163764; NM_025674
RefSeq (protein)	NP_001070979; NP_001305837; NP_009040	NP_001157235; NP_001157236; NP_079950
Location (UCSC)	Chr 6: 31.16 – 31.17 Mb	Chr 17: 35.82 – 35.83 Mb
PubMed search
- Wikidata
View/Edit Human	View/Edit Mouse

Transcription factor 19 is a protein that in humans is encoded by the TCF19 gene.
