= POLR2K =

Protein-coding gene in the species Homo sapiens

Identifiers
- Aliases: POLR2K, ABC10-alpha, RPABC4, RPB10alpha, RPB12, RPB7.0, hRPB7.0, hsRPB10a, polymerase (RNA) II subunit K, RNA polymerase II subunit K, RNA polymerase II, I and III subunit K
- External IDs: OMIM: 606033; MGI: 102725; GeneCards: POLR2K
Available structures
PDB	Ortholog search: PDBe RCSB
PDB	List of PDB id codes 5FLM, 5IY9, 5IYA, 5IYC, 5IYB, 5IY7, 5IY8, 5IYD, 5IY6

Gene location (Human)
Chr.	Chromosome 8 (human)
Band	8q22.2	Start	100,150,623 bp
Band	8q22.2	End	100,154,003 bp

Gene location (Mouse)
Chr.	Chromosome 15 (mouse)
Band	15|15 B3.1	Start	36,174,156 bp
Band	15|15 B3.1	End	36,177,156 bp
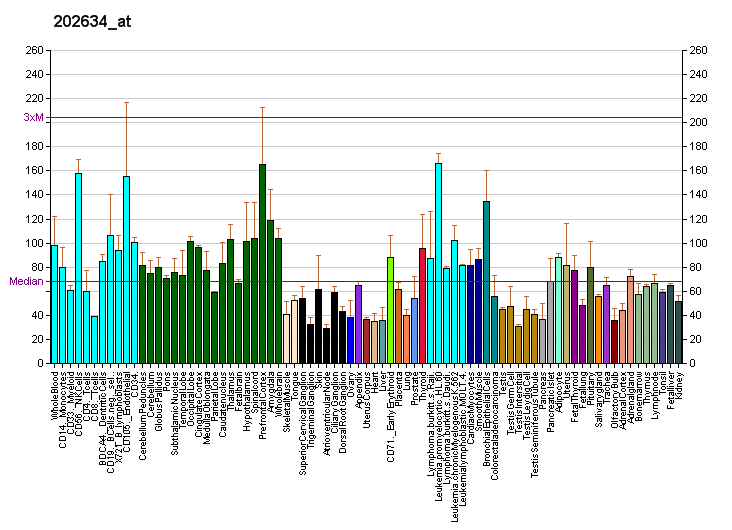

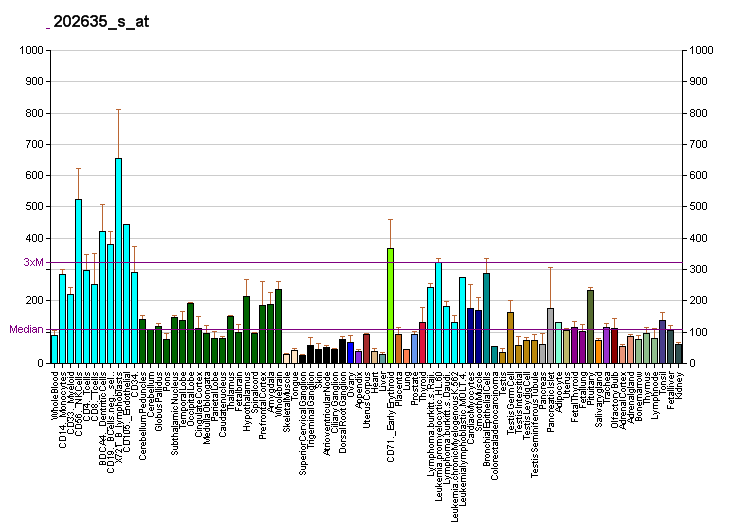
RNA expression pattern
Bgee	Human / Mouse (ortholog); Top expressed in: islet of Langerhans; Achilles tendon; tibial arteries; C1 segment; Brodmann area 9; left adrenal gland; right adrenal gland; rectum; ganglionic eminence; right adrenal cortex / Top expressed in: quadriceps femoris muscle; morula; neural tube; yolk sac; ventricular zone; ganglionic eminence; embryo; proximal tubule; embryo; blastocyst; More reference expression data
BioGPS	More reference expression data
Gene ontology
Molecular function	DNA binding; zinc ion binding; RNA polymerase II activity; metal ion binding; RNA polymerase III activity; DNA-directed 5'-3' RNA polymerase activity; RNA polymerase I activity
Cellular component	cytosol; nucleoplasm; RNA polymerase I complex; RNA polymerase III complex; RNA polymerase II, core complex; nucleus
Biological process	termination of RNA polymerase I transcription; mRNA splicing, via spliceosome; epigenetic maintenance of chromatin in transcription-competent conformation; regulation of transcription by RNA polymerase I; transcription initiation from RNA polymerase I promoter; transcription elongation from RNA polymerase II promoter; 7-methylguanosine mRNA capping; transcription by RNA polymerase II; transcription-coupled nucleotide-excision repair; transcription initiation from RNA polymerase II promoter; transcription by RNA polymerase III; snRNA transcription by RNA polymerase II; fibroblast growth factor receptor signaling pathway; RNA metabolic process; regulation of gene silencing by miRNA; transcription, DNA-templated; transcription elongation from RNA polymerase I promoter; positive regulation of type I interferon production; somatic stem cell population maintenance; positive regulation of viral transcription
Sources:Amigo / QuickGO
Orthologs
Databases	NCBI: entry; OMA: entry
Species	Human	Mouse
Entrez	5440	17749
Ensembl	ENSG00000147669	ENSMUSG00000045996
UniProt	P53803	Q63871
RefSeq (mRNA)	NM_005034	NM_001039368; NM_023127
RefSeq (protein)	NP_005025	NP_001034457; NP_075616
Location (UCSC)	Chr 8: 100.15 – 100.15 Mb	Chr 15: 36.17 – 36.18 Mb
PubMed search
- Wikidata
View/Edit Human	View/Edit Mouse

DNA-directed RNA polymerases I, II, and III subunit RPABC4 is a protein that in humans is encoded by the POLR2K gene.

This gene encodes one of the smallest subunits of RNA polymerase II, the polymerase responsible for synthesizing messenger RNA in eukaryotes. This subunit is shared by the other two DNA-directed RNA polymerases.

== Interactions ==
POLR2K has been shown to interact with POLR2C.
