= POLR2J =

Protein-coding gene in the species Homo sapiens

Identifiers
- Aliases: POLR2J, POLR2J1, RPB11, RPB11A, RPB11m, hRPB14, polymerase (RNA) II subunit J, RNA polymerase II subunit J
- External IDs: OMIM: 604150; MGI: 109582; GeneCards: POLR2J
Available structures
PDB	Ortholog search: PDBe RCSB
PDB	List of PDB id codes 5FLM, 5IY9, 5IYA, 5IYC, 5IYB, 5IY7, 5IY8, 5IYD, 5IY6

Gene location (Human)
Chr.	Chromosome 7 (human)
Band	7q22.1	Start	102,473,128 bp
Band	7q22.1	End	102,478,922 bp

Gene location (Mouse)
Chr.	Chromosome 5 (mouse)
Band	5|5 G2	Start	136,145,485 bp
Band	5|5 G2	End	136,151,801 bp
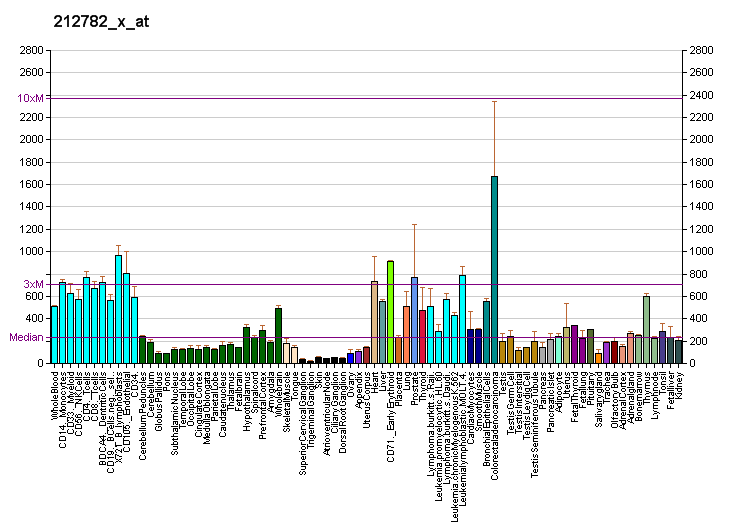
RNA expression pattern
Bgee	Human / Mouse (ortholog); Top expressed in: gastrocnemius muscle; muscle of thigh; apex of heart; left ventricle; right auricle of heart; left adrenal cortex; mucosa of transverse colon; substantia nigra; putamen; amygdala / Top expressed in: yolk sac; zygote; embryo; morula; embryo; otic placode; internal carotid artery; ventricular zone; primary oocyte; epiblast; More reference expression data
BioGPS	More reference expression data
Gene ontology
Molecular function	DNA binding; LRR domain binding; protein dimerization activity; DNA-directed 5'-3' RNA polymerase activity; protein binding; RNA polymerase II activity
Cellular component	nucleoplasm; nucleus; RNA polymerase II, core complex
Biological process	mRNA splicing, via spliceosome; transcription elongation from RNA polymerase II promoter; 7-methylguanosine mRNA capping; transcription-coupled nucleotide-excision repair; transcription initiation from RNA polymerase II promoter; snRNA transcription by RNA polymerase II; fibroblast growth factor receptor signaling pathway; RNA metabolic process; regulation of gene silencing by miRNA; transcription by RNA polymerase II; transcription, DNA-templated; somatic stem cell population maintenance; positive regulation of viral transcription
Sources:Amigo / QuickGO
Orthologs
Databases	NCBI: entry; OMA: entry
Species	Human	Mouse
Entrez	5439	20022
Ensembl	ENSG00000005075	ENSMUSG00000039771
UniProt	P52435	O08740
RefSeq (mRNA)	NM_006234; NM_001371100; NM_001393919	NM_011293
RefSeq (protein)	NP_006225; NP_001358029	n/a
Location (UCSC)	Chr 7: 102.47 – 102.48 Mb	Chr 5: 136.15 – 136.15 Mb
PubMed search
- Wikidata
View/Edit Human	View/Edit Mouse

DNA-directed RNA polymerase II subunit RPB11-a is an enzyme that in humans is encoded by the POLR2J gene.

== Function ==
This gene encodes a subunit of RNA polymerase II, the polymerase responsible for synthesizing messenger RNA in eukaryotes. The product of this gene exists as a heterodimer with another polymerase subunit; together they form a core subassembly unit of the polymerase. Two similar genes are located nearby on chromosome 7q22.1 and a pseudogene is found on chromosome 7p13.

== Interactions ==
POLR2J has been shown to interact with:

- Apoptosis antagonizing transcription factor,
- POLR2C, and
- SATB1.
