= POLR2B =

Protein-coding gene in the species Homo sapiens

Identifiers
- Aliases: POLR2B, POL2RB, RPB2, hRPB140, hsRPB2, polymerase (RNA) II subunit B, RNA polymerase II subunit B
- External IDs: OMIM: 180661; MGI: 2388280; GeneCards: POLR2B
Available structures
PDB	Ortholog search: PDBe RCSB
PDB	List of PDB id codes 5IY9, 5IYA, 5IYC, 5IYB, 5IY7, 5IY8, 5IYD, 5IY6
Enzyme activity
EC #	BRENDA	ExPASy	KEGG	MetaCyc
2.7.7.6	↗	↗	↗	↗
2.7.7.48	↗	↗	↗	↗

Gene location (Human)
Chr.	Chromosome 4 (human)
Band	4q12	Start	56,977,722 bp
Band	4q12	End	57,031,158 bp

Gene location (Mouse)
Chr.	Chromosome 5 (mouse)
Band	5|5 C3.3	Start	77,457,994 bp
Band	5|5 C3.3	End	77,497,171 bp
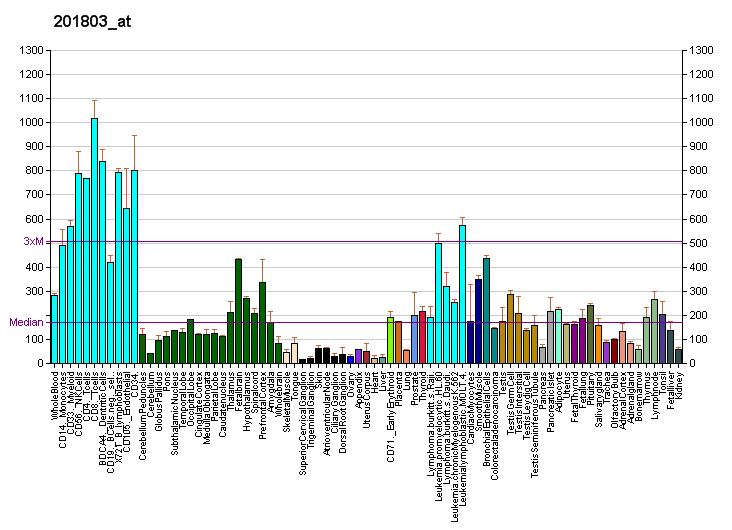
RNA expression pattern
Bgee	Human / Mouse (ortholog); Top expressed in: epithelium of nasopharynx; germinal epithelium; endothelial cell; middle temporal gyrus; tibia; human penis; gingival epithelium; Brodmann area 23; parietal pleura; Achilles tendon / Top expressed in: saccule; otic placode; otic vesicle; primitive streak; hair follicle; ciliary body; ureter; genital tubercle; medullary collecting duct; vestibular membrane of cochlear duct; More reference expression data
BioGPS	More reference expression data
Gene ontology
Molecular function	transferase activity; DNA binding; nucleotidyltransferase activity; ribonucleoside binding; RNA polymerase II activity; chromatin binding; metal ion binding; DNA-directed 5'-3' RNA polymerase activity; protein binding; RNA binding
Cellular component	membrane; RNA polymerase II, core complex; nucleus; nucleoplasm
Biological process	mRNA splicing, via spliceosome; somatic stem cell population maintenance; transcription elongation from RNA polymerase II promoter; 7-methylguanosine mRNA capping; transcription by RNA polymerase II; positive regulation of viral transcription; transcription-coupled nucleotide-excision repair; transcription initiation from RNA polymerase II promoter; snRNA transcription by RNA polymerase II; fibroblast growth factor receptor signaling pathway; transcription, DNA-templated; RNA metabolic process; regulation of gene silencing by miRNA
Sources:Amigo / QuickGO
Orthologs
Databases	NCBI: entry; OMA: entry
Species	Human	Mouse
Entrez	5431	231329
Ensembl	ENSG00000047315	ENSMUSG00000029250
UniProt	P30876	Q8CFI7
RefSeq (mRNA)	NM_001303269; NM_000938; NM_001303268	NM_153798
RefSeq (protein)	NP_000929; NP_001290197; NP_001290198	NP_722493
Location (UCSC)	Chr 4: 56.98 – 57.03 Mb	Chr 5: 77.46 – 77.5 Mb
PubMed search
- Wikidata
View/Edit Human	View/Edit Mouse

DNA-directed RNA polymerase II subunit RPB2 is an enzyme that in humans is encoded by the POLR2B gene.

This gene encodes the second largest subunit of RNA polymerase II, the polymerase responsible for synthesizing messenger RNA in eukaryotes. This subunit, in combination with at least two other polymerase subunits, forms a structure within the polymerase that maintains contact in the active site of the enzyme between the DNA template and the newly synthesized RNA.

== Interactions ==
POLR2B has been shown to interact with POLR2C, POLR2E, POLR2H and POLR2L.
