= POLR2L =

Protein-coding gene in the species Homo sapiens

Identifiers
- Aliases: POLR2L, RBP10, RPABC5, RPB10, RPB10beta, RPB7.6, hRPB7.6, polymerase (RNA) II subunit L, RNA polymerase II subunit L, RNA polymerase II, I and III subunit L
- External IDs: OMIM: 601189; MGI: 1913741; GeneCards: POLR2L
Available structures
PDB	Ortholog search: PDBe RCSB
PDB	List of PDB id codes 5FLM, 5IYD, 5IYC, 5IY8, 5IYA, 5IYB, 5IY6, 5IY9, 5IY7

Gene location (Human)
Chr.	Chromosome 11 (human)
Band	11p15.5	Start	837,356 bp
Band	11p15.5	End	842,529 bp

Gene location (Mouse)
Chr.	Chromosome 7 (mouse)
Band	7|7 F5	Start	141,051,773 bp
Band	7|7 F5	End	141,055,045 bp
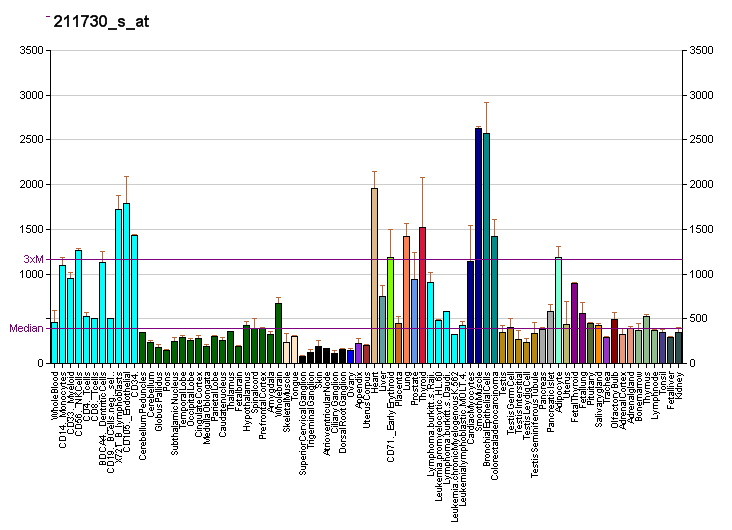

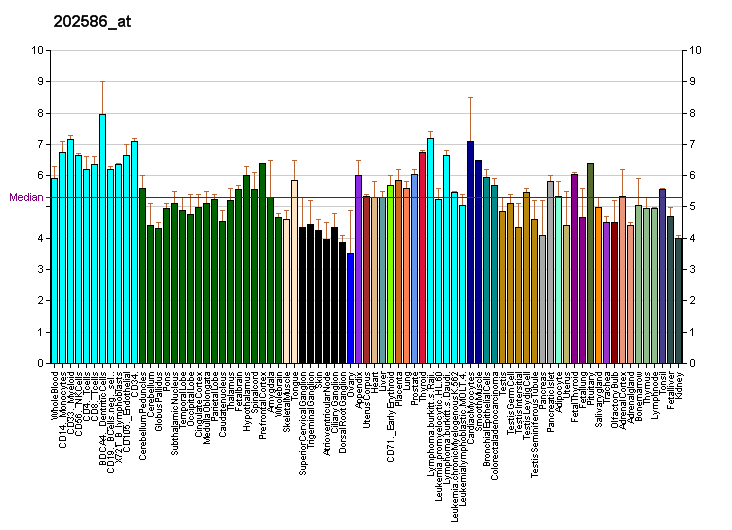
RNA expression pattern
Bgee	Human / Mouse (ortholog); Top expressed in: apex of heart; right ventricle; left ventricle; right auricle of heart; myocardium of left ventricle; abdominal fat; mucosa of transverse colon; biceps brachii; right adrenal gland; body of pancreas / Top expressed in: morula; embryo; proximal tubule; embryo; adrenal gland; right kidney; lens; bone marrow; yolk sac; muscle of thigh; More reference expression data
BioGPS	More reference expression data
Gene ontology
Molecular function	DNA binding; zinc ion binding; RNA polymerase II activity; metal ion binding; RNA polymerase III activity; DNA-directed 5'-3' RNA polymerase activity; protein binding; RNA polymerase I activity
Cellular component	cytosol; nucleoplasm; RNA polymerase I complex; RNA polymerase III complex; RNA polymerase II, core complex; nucleus
Biological process	termination of RNA polymerase I transcription; mRNA splicing, via spliceosome; epigenetic maintenance of chromatin in transcription-competent conformation; regulation of transcription by RNA polymerase I; transcription initiation from RNA polymerase I promoter; transcription elongation from RNA polymerase II promoter; 7-methylguanosine mRNA capping; transcription by RNA polymerase II; transcription-coupled nucleotide-excision repair; transcription initiation from RNA polymerase II promoter; fibroblast growth factor receptor signaling pathway; transcription by RNA polymerase III; snRNA transcription by RNA polymerase II; RNA metabolic process; regulation of gene silencing by miRNA; transcription, DNA-templated; transcription elongation from RNA polymerase I promoter; positive regulation of type I interferon production; somatic stem cell population maintenance; positive regulation of viral transcription
Sources:Amigo / QuickGO
Orthologs
Databases	NCBI: entry; OMA: entry
Species	Human	Mouse
Entrez	5441	66491
Ensembl	ENSG00000177700	ENSMUSG00000038489
UniProt	P62875	P62876
RefSeq (mRNA)	NM_021128	NM_025593
RefSeq (protein)	NP_066951	NP_079869
Location (UCSC)	Chr 11: 0.84 – 0.84 Mb	Chr 7: 141.05 – 141.06 Mb
PubMed search
- Wikidata
View/Edit Human	View/Edit Mouse

DNA-directed RNA polymerases I, II, and III subunit RPABC5 is a protein that in humans is encoded by the POLR2L gene.

== Function ==
This gene encodes a subunit of RNA polymerase II, the polymerase responsible for synthesizing messenger RNA in eukaryotes. The product of this gene contains four conserved cysteines characteristic of an atypical zinc-binding domain. Like its counterpart in yeast, this unit may be shared by the other two DNA-directed RNA polymerases.

== Interactions ==
POLR2L has been shown to interact with POLR2C, POLR2A, POLR2B and POLR2E.
