= POLR2G =

Protein-coding gene in the species Homo sapiens

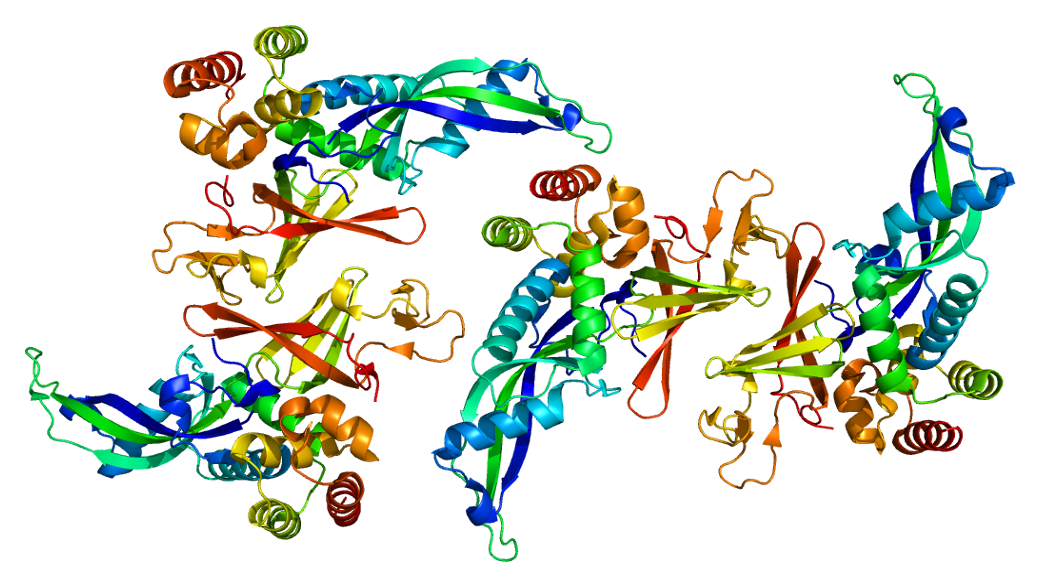

Identifiers
- Aliases: POLR2G, RPB19, RPB7, hRPB19, hsRPB7, polymerase (RNA) II subunit G, RNA polymerase II subunit G
- External IDs: OMIM: 602013; MGI: 1914960; GeneCards: POLR2G
Available structures
PDB	Ortholog search: PDBe RCSB
PDB	List of PDB id codes 2C35, 5FLM, 5IY9, 5IYA, 5IYC, 5IYB, 5IY7, 5IY8, 5IYD, 5IY6

Gene location (Human)
Chr.	Chromosome 11 (human)
Band	11q12.3	Start	62,761,565 bp
Band	11q12.3	End	62,766,710 bp

Gene location (Mouse)
Chr.	Chromosome 19 (mouse)
Band	19|19 A	Start	8,770,491 bp
Band	19|19 A	End	8,775,941 bp
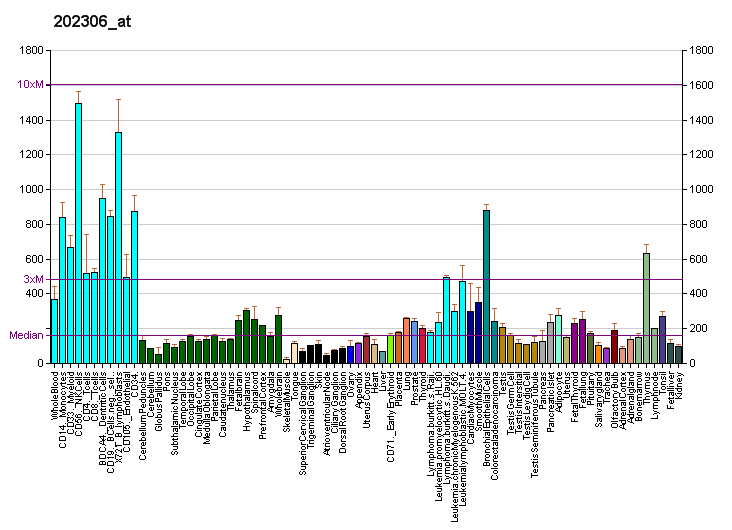
RNA expression pattern
Bgee	Human / Mouse (ortholog); Top expressed in: ventricular zone; granulocyte; ganglionic eminence; C1 segment; right adrenal gland; right adrenal cortex; monocyte; stromal cell of endometrium; Descending thoracic aorta; rectum / Top expressed in: medial ganglionic eminence; endocardial cushion; primary oocyte; facial motor nucleus; otic placode; atrioventricular junction; condyle; primitive streak; renal corpuscle; mandibular prominence; More reference expression data
BioGPS	More reference expression data
Gene ontology
Molecular function	DNA-directed 5'-3' RNA polymerase activity; single-stranded DNA binding; single-stranded RNA binding; RNA binding; nucleic acid binding; translation initiation factor binding
Cellular component	P-body; nucleoplasm; RNA polymerase II, core complex; nucleus
Biological process	mRNA splicing, via spliceosome; positive regulation of nuclear-transcribed mRNA poly(A) tail shortening; transcription elongation from RNA polymerase II promoter; 7-methylguanosine mRNA capping; transcription by RNA polymerase II; transcription-coupled nucleotide-excision repair; transcription initiation from RNA polymerase II promoter; positive regulation of translational initiation; nuclear-transcribed mRNA catabolic process, exonucleolytic; apoptotic process; snRNA transcription by RNA polymerase II; fibroblast growth factor receptor signaling pathway; RNA metabolic process; regulation of gene silencing by miRNA; transcription, DNA-templated; somatic stem cell population maintenance; positive regulation of viral transcription
Sources:Amigo / QuickGO
Orthologs
Databases	NCBI: entry; OMA: entry
Species	Human	Mouse
Entrez	5436	67710
Ensembl	ENSG00000168002	ENSMUSG00000071662
UniProt	P62487	P62488
RefSeq (mRNA)	NM_002696	NM_026329
RefSeq (protein)	NP_002687	NP_080605
Location (UCSC)	Chr 11: 62.76 – 62.77 Mb	Chr 19: 8.77 – 8.78 Mb
PubMed search
- Wikidata
View/Edit Human	View/Edit Mouse

DNA-directed RNA polymerase II subunit RPB7 is an enzyme that in humans is encoded by the POLR2G gene.

This gene encodes the seventh largest subunit of RNA polymerase II, the polymerase responsible for synthesizing messenger RNA in eukaryotes. In yeast, the association of this subunit with the polymerase under suboptimal growth conditions indicates it may play a role in regulating polymerase function.

== Interactions ==
POLR2G has been shown to interact with TAF15, POLR2C, POLR2H and POLR2E.
