= POLR2E =

Protein-coding gene in the species Homo sapiens

Identifiers
- Aliases: POLR2E, RPABC1, RPB5, XAP4, hRPB25, hsRPB5, polymerase (RNA) II subunit E, RNA polymerase II subunit E, RNA polymerase II, I and III subunit E
- External IDs: OMIM: 180664; MGI: 1913670; GeneCards: POLR2E
Available structures
PDB	Ortholog search: PDBe RCSB
PDB	List of PDB id codes 5IY6, 5IY9, 5IY8, 5IYA, 5IYB, 5IY7, 5IYC, 5IYD

Gene location (Human)
Chr.	Chromosome 19 (human)
Band	19p13.3	Start	1,086,574 bp
Band	19p13.3	End	1,095,380 bp

Gene location (Mouse)
Chr.	Chromosome 10 (mouse)
Band	10|10 C1	Start	79,871,783 bp
Band	10|10 C1	End	79,875,629 bp
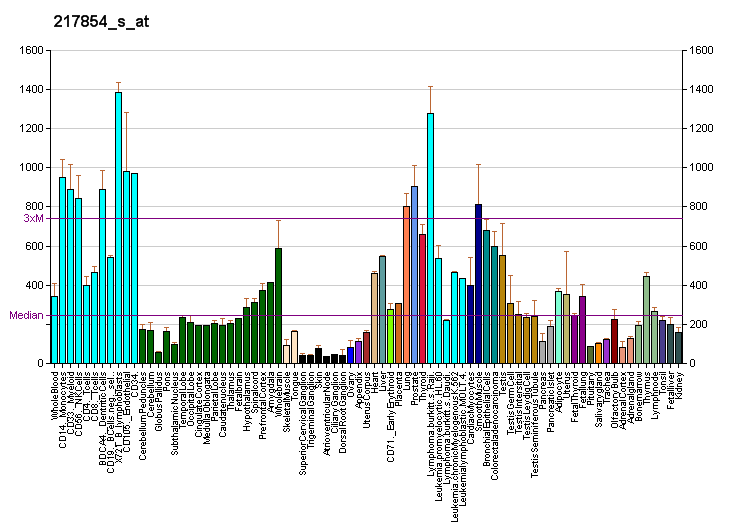

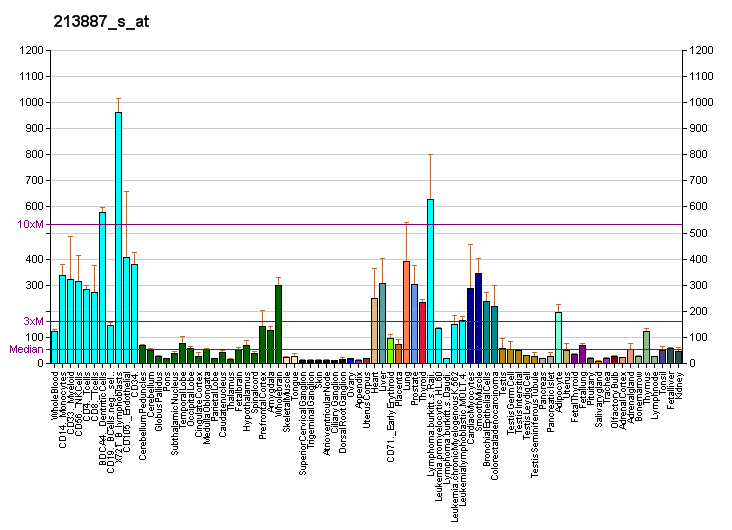
RNA expression pattern
Bgee	Human / Mouse (ortholog); Top expressed in: stromal cell of endometrium; right lobe of liver; prefrontal cortex; right frontal lobe; muscle of thigh; muscle layer of sigmoid colon; right adrenal gland; popliteal artery; abdominal fat; tibial arteries / Top expressed in: yolk sac; embryo; morula; embryo; somite; blastocyst; epiblast; mandibular prominence; maxillary prominence; otic placode; More reference expression data
BioGPS	More reference expression data
Gene ontology
Molecular function	DNA binding; RNA polymerase II activity; RNA polymerase III activity; protein binding; RNA polymerase I activity; DNA-directed 5'-3' RNA polymerase activity
Cellular component	cytosol; RNA polymerase I complex; RNA polymerase III complex; RNA polymerase II, core complex; nucleus; nucleoplasm
Biological process	termination of RNA polymerase I transcription; mRNA splicing, via spliceosome; epigenetic maintenance of chromatin in transcription-competent conformation; transcription initiation from RNA polymerase I promoter; transcription elongation from RNA polymerase II promoter; 7-methylguanosine mRNA capping; transcription by RNA polymerase II; transcription-coupled nucleotide-excision repair; transcription initiation from RNA polymerase II promoter; viral process; transcription by RNA polymerase III; fibroblast growth factor receptor signaling pathway; snRNA transcription by RNA polymerase II; RNA metabolic process; regulation of gene silencing by miRNA; transcription, DNA-templated; transcription elongation from RNA polymerase I promoter; positive regulation of type I interferon production; somatic stem cell population maintenance; positive regulation of viral transcription
Sources:Amigo / QuickGO
Orthologs
Databases	NCBI: entry; OMA: entry
Species	Human	Mouse
Entrez	5434	66420
Ensembl	ENSG00000099817	ENSMUSG00000004667
UniProt	P19388	Q80UW8
RefSeq (mRNA)	NM_002695; NM_001316323; NM_001316324	NM_025554
RefSeq (protein)	NP_001303252; NP_001303253; NP_002686	NP_079830
Location (UCSC)	Chr 19: 1.09 – 1.1 Mb	Chr 10: 79.87 – 79.88 Mb
PubMed search
- Wikidata
View/Edit Human	View/Edit Mouse

DNA-directed RNA polymerases I, II, and III subunit RPABC1 is a protein that in humans is encoded by the POLR2E gene.

This gene encodes the fifth largest subunit of RNA polymerase II, the polymerase responsible for synthesizing messenger RNA in eukaryotes. This subunit is shared by the other two DNA-directed RNA polymerases and is present in two-fold molar excess over the other polymerase subunits. An interaction between this subunit and a hepatitis virus transactivating protein has been demonstrated, suggesting that interaction between transcriptional activators and the polymerase can occur through this subunit. A pseudogene is located on chromosome 11.

== Interactions ==
POLR2E has been shown to interact with TAF15, POLR2C, POLR2G, POLR2H, POLR2A, POLR2B, POLR2L and GTF2F2.
