= POLR2H =

Protein-coding gene in the species Homo sapiens

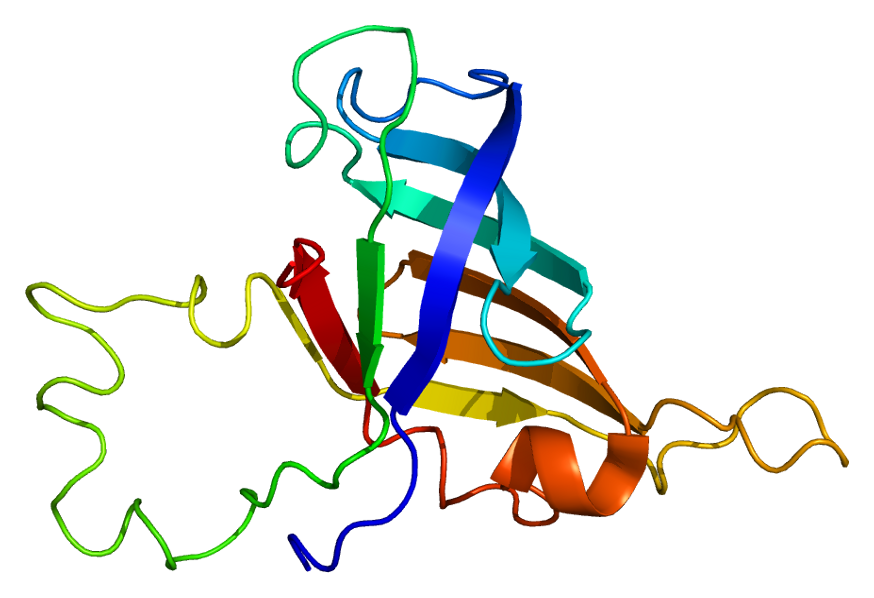

Identifiers
- Aliases: POLR2H, RPABC3, RPB17, RPB8, polymerase (RNA) II subunit H, RNA polymerase II subunit H, RNA polymerase II, I and III subunit H
- External IDs: OMIM: 606023; MGI: 2384309; GeneCards: POLR2H
Available structures
PDB	Ortholog search: PDBe RCSB
PDB	List of PDB id codes 2F3I, 5FLM, 5IY9, 5IYA, 5IYC, 5IYB, 5IY7, 5IY8, 5IYD, 5IY6

Gene location (Human)
Chr.	Chromosome 3 (human)
Band	3q27.1	Start	184,361,718 bp
Band	3q27.1	End	184,368,596 bp

Gene location (Mouse)
Chr.	Chromosome 16 (mouse)
Band	16|16 B1	Start	20,536,415 bp
Band	16|16 B1	End	20,541,017 bp
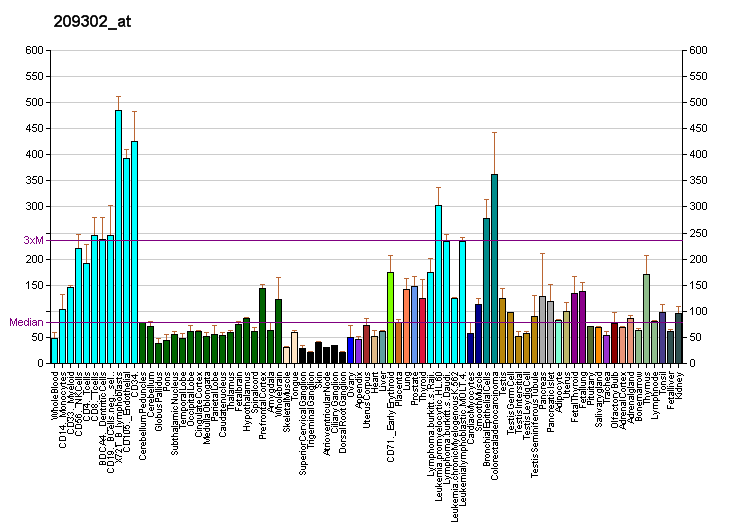

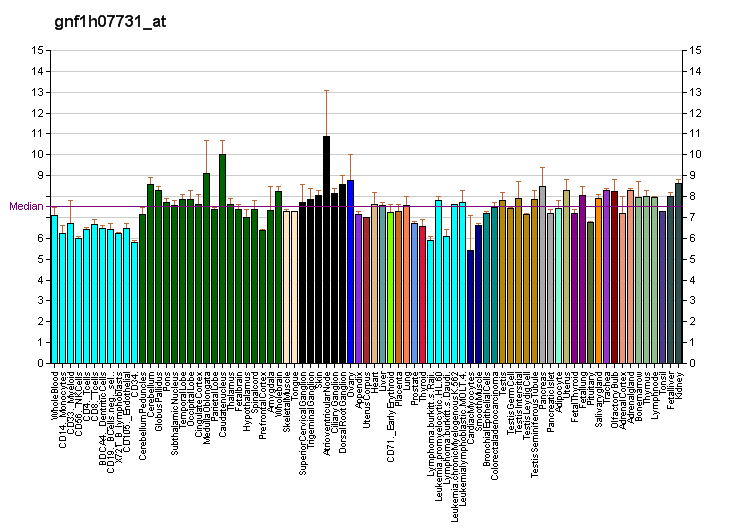
RNA expression pattern
Bgee	Human / Mouse (ortholog); Top expressed in: mucosa of transverse colon; pancreatic ductal cell; right lobe of thyroid gland; right uterine tube; left lobe of thyroid gland; right adrenal gland; right adrenal cortex; left adrenal cortex; rectum; canal of the cervix / Top expressed in: epiblast; embryo; morula; embryo; ventricular zone; neural tube; yolk sac; tail of embryo; ganglionic eminence; ileum; More reference expression data
BioGPS	More reference expression data
Gene ontology
Molecular function	DNA-directed 5'-3' RNA polymerase activity; DNA binding; RNA polymerase I activity; RNA polymerase II activity; RNA polymerase III activity; single-stranded DNA binding
Cellular component	nucleolus; RNA polymerase II, core complex; nucleoplasm; cytosol; nucleus; RNA polymerase III complex; RNA polymerase I complex; protein-DNA complex
Biological process	7-methylguanosine mRNA capping; transcription elongation from RNA polymerase II promoter; transcription initiation from RNA polymerase I promoter; mRNA splicing, via spliceosome; epigenetic maintenance of chromatin in transcription-competent conformation; transcription-coupled nucleotide-excision repair; termination of RNA polymerase I transcription; transcription initiation from RNA polymerase II promoter; transcription by RNA polymerase II; snRNA transcription by RNA polymerase II; fibroblast growth factor receptor signaling pathway; transcription by RNA polymerase III; RNA metabolic process; regulation of gene silencing by miRNA; transcription, DNA-templated; transcription elongation from RNA polymerase I promoter; positive regulation of type I interferon production; somatic stem cell population maintenance; positive regulation of viral transcription
Sources:Amigo / QuickGO
Orthologs
Databases	NCBI: entry; OMA: entry
Species	Human	Mouse
Entrez	5437	245841
Ensembl	ENSG00000163882	ENSMUSG00000021018
UniProt	P52434	Q923G2
RefSeq (mRNA)	NM_001278698; NM_001278699; NM_001278700; NM_001278714; NM_001278715 NM_006232; NM_001346879	NM_145632; NM_001356423
RefSeq (protein)	NP_001265627; NP_001265628; NP_001265629; NP_001265643; NP_001265644 NP_001333808; NP_006223	NP_663607; NP_001343352
Location (UCSC)	Chr 3: 184.36 – 184.37 Mb	Chr 16: 20.54 – 20.54 Mb
PubMed search
- Wikidata
View/Edit Human	View/Edit Mouse

DNA-directed RNA polymerases I, II, and III subunit RPABC3 is a protein that in humans is encoded by the POLR2H gene.

This gene encodes one of the essential subunits of RNA polymerase II that is shared by the other two eukaryotic DNA-directed RNA polymerases, I and III.

== Interactions ==
POLR2H has been shown to interact with POLR2C, POLR2G, POLR2A, POLR2B and POLR2E.
