= Negative elongation factor B =

Protein found in humans

NELFB

Identifiers
- Aliases: NELFB, COBRA1, NELF-B, Cofactor of BRCA1, negative elongation factor complex member B
- External IDs: OMIM: 611180; MGI: 1931035; GeneCards: NELFB

Gene location (Human)
Chr.	Chromosome 9 (human)
Band	9q34.3	Start	137,255,327 bp
Band	9q34.3	End	137,273,542 bp

Gene location (Mouse)
Chr.	Chromosome 2 (mouse)
Band	2|2 A3	Start	25,089,724 bp
Band	2|2 A3	End	25,101,501 bp
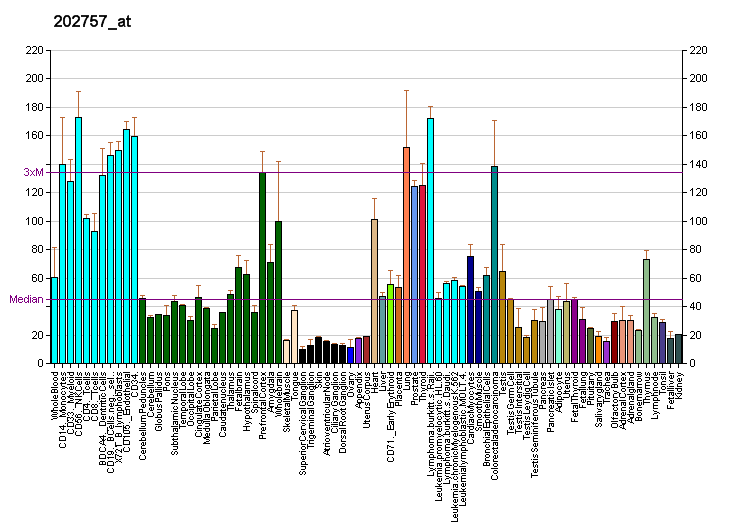
RNA expression pattern
Bgee	Human / Mouse (ortholog); Top expressed in: apex of heart; ventricular zone; right frontal lobe; mucosa of transverse colon; cingulate gyrus; anterior cingulate cortex; ganglionic eminence; amygdala; tendon of biceps brachii; stromal cell of endometrium / Top expressed in: otic vesicle; saccule; medullary collecting duct; mesenteric lymph nodes; molar; otic placode; granulocyte; dentate gyrus of hippocampal formation granule cell; left lung lobe; neural layer of retina; More reference expression data
BioGPS	More reference expression data
Gene ontology
Molecular function	protein binding; RNA binding
Cellular component	nucleus; cytoplasm; NELF complex; nucleoplasm
Biological process	transcription elongation from RNA polymerase II promoter; regulation of transcription, DNA-templated; transcription by RNA polymerase II; negative regulation of transcription elongation from RNA polymerase II promoter; transcription, DNA-templated; negative regulation of transcription, DNA-templated; cell population proliferation; stem cell differentiation; negative regulation of stem cell differentiation; positive regulation of viral transcription
Sources:Amigo / QuickGO
Orthologs
Databases	NCBI: entry; OMA: entry
Species	Human	Mouse
Entrez	25920	58202
Ensembl	ENSG00000188986	ENSMUSG00000013465
UniProt	Q8WX92	Q8C4Y3
RefSeq (mRNA)	NM_015456	NM_021393; NM_001310157
RefSeq (protein)	NP_056271	NP_001297086; NP_067368
Location (UCSC)	Chr 9: 137.26 – 137.27 Mb	Chr 2: 25.09 – 25.1 Mb
PubMed search
- Wikidata
View/Edit Human	View/Edit Mouse

Negative elongation factor B (NELF-B), also known as Cofactor of BRCA1 (COBRA1), is a protein which in humans is encoded by the NELFB gene.

== Function ==
NELF-B is a subunit of negative elongation factor (NELF), which also includes NELF-A, either NELF-C or NELF-D (NELF-C/D), and NELF-E. NELF acts with DRB sensitivity-inducing factor (DSIF), a heterodimer of SPT4 (SUPT4H1) and SPT5 (SUPT5H), to cause transcriptional pausing of RNA polymerase II. COBRA1 was initially identified in a yeast two-hybrid screen using the BRCT1 domain of BRCA1 as bait.

== Interactions ==
NELF-B has been shown to interact with:

- BRCA1
- C-Fos,
- C-jun,
- Estrogen receptor alpha,
- NELF-C/D, and
- NELF-E.
