= LENG9 =

Protein found in humans

Identifiers
- Aliases: LENG9, leukocyte receptor cluster member 9
- External IDs: MGI: 2444509; GeneCards: LENG9

Gene location (Human)
Chr.	Chromosome 19 (human)
Band	19q13.42	Start	54,461,732 bp
Band	19q13.42	End	54,463,778 bp

Gene location (Mouse)
Chr.	Chromosome 7 (mouse)
Band	7|7 A1	Start	4,150,914 bp
Band	7|7 A1	End	4,153,373 bp
RNA expression pattern
Bgee	Human / Mouse (ortholog); Top expressed in: body of pancreas; mucosa of transverse colon; gonad; testicle; duodenum; apex of heart; body of stomach; Descending thoracic aorta; ascending aorta; stromal cell of endometrium / Top expressed in: jejunum; duodenum; left colon; spinal ganglia; otic vesicle; granulocyte; ileum; blood; right kidney; proximal tubule; More reference expression data
BioGPS	n/a
Orthologs
Databases	NCBI: entry; OMA: entry
Species	Human	Mouse
Entrez	94059	243813
Ensembl	ENSG00000273574; ENSG00000278312; ENSG00000274495; ENSG00000275183	ENSMUSG00000043432
UniProt	Q96B70	Q8BTN6
RefSeq (mRNA)	NM_198988; NM_001301782	NM_175529
RefSeq (protein)	NP_001288711; NP_945339	NP_780738
Location (UCSC)	Chr 19: 54.46 – 54.46 Mb	Chr 7: 4.15 – 4.15 Mb
PubMed search
- Wikidata
View/Edit Human	View/Edit Mouse

Leukocyte Receptor Cluster Member 9 (LENG 9) is an uncharacterized protein encoded by the LENG9 gene. In humans, LENG9 is predicted to play a role in fertility and reproductive disorders associated with female endometrium structures.

== Gene ==
=== Location ===
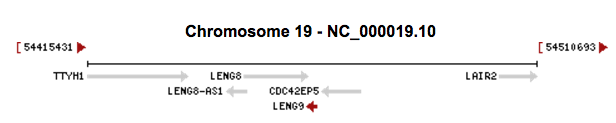
Gene neighborhood of LENG9 on chromosome 19.

LENG9 is located at 19q13.42 on chromosome 19, spanning the sense strand (-) from 54,461,796 bp to 54,463,711 bp. The LENG9 gene is 1,930 base pairs in length and contains one exon.

=== Gene neighborhood ===
Genes LENG8-AS1 and CDC42EP5 neighbor LENG9 on chromosome 19. CDC42EP5 extends over the same region of LENG9 while LENG8-AS1 is located to the left of both genes. TTYH1 and LENG8 are also found in the same gene neighborhood but are located on the opposite strand.

=== Expression ===
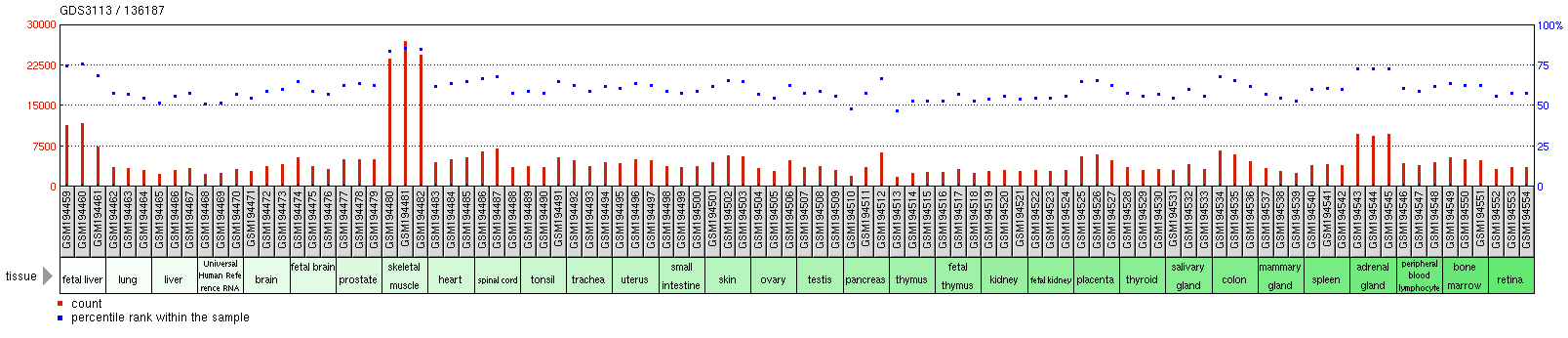
LENG9 expression in various tissues

LENG9 is highly expressed (75-100%) in skeletal muscles and part of fetal liver tissues while ubiquitous expression of LENG9 is moderate (50-75%) in all other tissues observed. Human expression of LENG9 is observed in the cervix, lung, and placenta of adults. The gene is also expressed in disease states including lung tumors and primitive neuroectodermal tumors, usually found in children or young adults. However, LENG9 is not expressed during the juvenile stage of development.

=== Promoter ===
The promoter region is predicted to be 1101 base pairs in length. The transcriptional start site found in this region is located 119 bp upstream of the start codon as well as an in-frame stop codon at 1087 bp to 1089 bp.

== mRNA transcript ==
=== Splice variants ===
In humans, LENG9 has two mRNA unspliced transcript variants. Variant (1) is the longest and most conserved transcript of the gene and is made up of one exon that is composed of 1,919 bp.

== Protein ==
=== General properties ===
LENG9 is 501 amino acids in length, with a predicted molecular weight of 53.2 kDa. The isoelectric point of LENG9 protein is predicted to be 7.7. No known transmembrane sequences were found for LENG9.

=== Composition ===
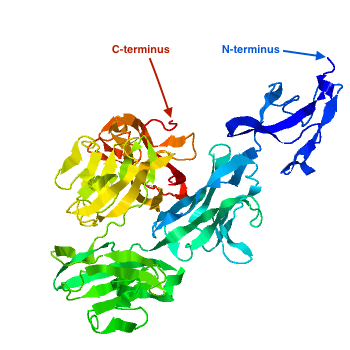
Predicted tertiary structure of LENG9 protein.

Analysis of the LENG9 protein was performed against the "human" database, which indicated a higher frequency of alanine and proline amino acids than of that of a normal human protein. Inversely, an abnormally lower frequency of aspartate, isoleucine, methionine, asparagine, serine, and tyrosine amino acids were detected.

=== Structure ===
The secondary structure of LENG9 is predicted to be composed of alpha-helices and beta-sheets throughout the sequence. The tertiary structure of LENG9 is displayed in the image to the right.

=== Sub-cellular localization ===
A strong signal peptide detected in the mitochondrion region (0.788) suggests that the LENG9 protein localizes in the mitochondrial matrix. However, further analysis among other mammal orthologs predicted sub-cellular localization in the cytoplasm and nuclear localization for Danio rerio.

=== Post translational modifications ===
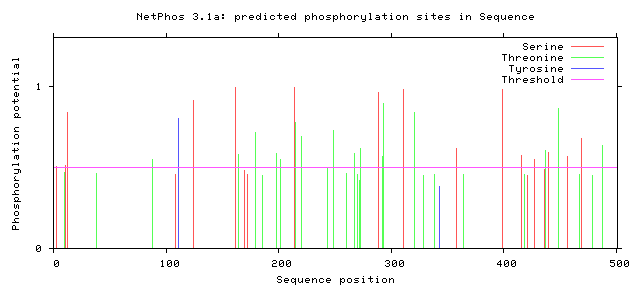
Predicted phosphorylation sites of LENG9.

LENG9 is predicted to undergo post-translational modifications such as phosphorylation, N-terminal acetylation, sumoylation, and C-terminal Glycosylphosphatidylinositol (GPI) anchor modification.

==== Phosphorylation ====
LENG9 contains numerous phosphorylation sites distributed in the protein sequence, as show in the diagram to the right. These sites include casein kinase 2 (CK2), cAMP-dependent protein kinase (PKA), protein kinase C (PKC), ataxia telangiectasia mutated kinase (ATM), cyclin-dependent kinase 5 (CDK5), and casein kinase 1 (CK1).

==== N-terminal acetylation ====
There is one predicted N-terminal acetylation site found in the protein LENG9 at the serine amino acid position 3.

==== Sumoylation ====
There are two predicted sumoylation sites within LENG9 at position 82 and 452 on lysine residues.

==== C-terminal GPI anchor modification ====
A C-terminal GPI modification site was found on the glycine residue at position 486.

=== Domains and motifs ===
There are 3 conserved domains in LENG9. The metal-ion binding zinc finger domain ZnF_C3H1 is found from amino acid 46 to 61. LENG9 also has a domain of unknown function belonging to the domain family DUF504, that spans from amino acid 109 to 160. The last conserved domain spans from amino acid 320 to 500 and is known as AKAP7 2'5' RNA ligase-like domain (AKAP7_NLS).

Conserved WD40 repeats are found in LENG9, spanning from amino acid 98 to 159. This motif is characterized by beta-propeller structures in the tertiary structure.

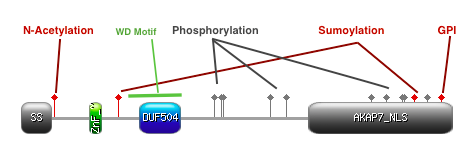
PTM, domain, and motif schematic of LENG9 gene.

=== Protein interactions ===
LENG9 is found to interact with the C9ORF41 protein that encodes methyltransferase, involved in converting carnosine to anserine present in skeletal muscle. Another interactor is CDC5L, which is a positive regulator for the cell cycle for phase G2 to M transition. FOXS1 is another interacting protein that functions as a transcriptional repressor to suppress promoters such as FASLG, FOXO3, and FOXO4.

== Clinical significance ==
=== Disease association ===
The LENG9 gene was found to be up-regulated and expressed in endothelial endometrium (hEECs) tissues during various stages of the menstrual/reproductive cycle when transfected with the RNA gene, miR-30d. As ectopic over-expression of miR-30d in hEECs is observed to affect cancer-associated genes, LENG9 is predicted to play a role in reproductive and endocrine system disorders.

=== Fertility ===
Analysis of endometrial receptivity using miRNA of receptive and prereceptive endometrium from fertile women also indicated significant up-regulation of miR-30d. Consequently, the induced expression of LENG9 from miR-30d transfection suggests a possible relationship between the LENG9 gene and female fertility functions.

== Homology ==
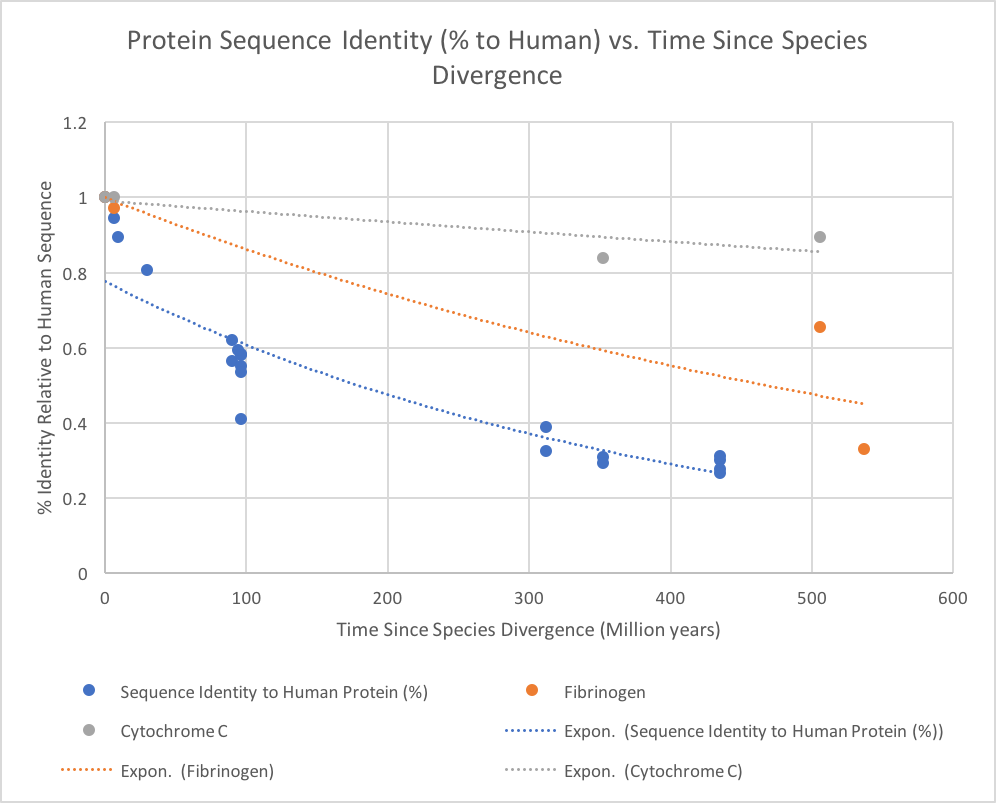
Change of evolution rate for LENG9 compared to fibrinogen and cytochrome C.

=== Evolution ===
Comparison of the LENG9 protein was conducted against fibrinogen and cytochrome C to observe the rate of evolutionary change. The relatively fast rate of change in LENG9 compared to that of other proteins suggests that the gene is adaptive for vital cell structures and functions.

=== Paralogs ===
There are no known paralogs for LENG9.

=== Orthologs ===
LENG9 is highly conserved in mammals and bony fish such as the zebrafish. It is also conserved a in few reptiles and amphibians. The gene is not present in invertebrates, birds, bacteria, or fungi

Genus and species	Common name	Order	Divergence from Human Lineage (MYA)	NCBI Accession Number	Sequence length (bp)	Percent identity to Human	Percent Similarity to Human
Homo sapiens	Human	Primates	0	NP_945339.2	501	100%	100%
Pan troglodytes	Chimpanzee	Primates	6.65	XP_003316725.1	479	94.4%	94.4%
Gorilla gorilla gorilla	Gorilla	Primates	9.06	XP_018870227.1	458	89.4%	89.8%
Macaca mulatta	Rhesus Macaque	Primates	29.44	XP_014980381.1	476	80.7%	83.5%
Ictidomys tridecemlineatus	Thirteen-Lined Squirrel	Rodentia	90	XP_005341645.1	490	62.1%	68.2%
Peromyscus maniculatus bairdii	Deer Mouse	Rodentia	90	XP_006995933.1	488	56.6%	63.5%
Ceratotherium simum simum	Southern White Rhinoceros	Perissodactyla	96	XP_014649760.1	528	58.3%	64.1%
Equus caballus	Horse	Perissodactyla	96	XP_001488865.2	506	58.0%	63.5%
Odobenus rosmarus divergens	Walrus	Carnivora	94	XP_004415925.1	527	59.3%	62.5%
Panthera pardus	Leopard	Carnivora	96	XP_019292295.1	540	55.1%	61.0%
Bos taurus	Cattle	Artiodactyla	96	XP_005192875.1	535	53.6%	58.7%
Ovis aries	Sheep	Artiodactyla	96	XP_014955819.1	669	41.1%	47.1%
Alligator mississippiensis	American Alligator	Crocodilla	312	XP_014459626.1	452	39.0%	46.5%
Thamnophis sirtalis	Common Garter Snake	Squamata	312	XP_013921249.1	505	32.6%	45.5%
Xenopus laevis	African Clawed Frog	Anura	352	XP_018080040.1	431	30.9%	40.6%
Nanorana parkeri	High Himalaya Frog	Anura	352	XP_018430267.1	401	29.4%	39.3%
Lates calcarifer	Barramundi	Perciformes	435	XP_018538114.1	565	31.3%	38.2%
Nothobranchius furzeri	Tortoise Killfish	Cyprinodontiformes	435	XP_015805834.1	537	30.3%	39.4%
Danio Rerio	Zebrafish	Cyprinodontiformes	435	XP_005157957.1	542	27.9%	37.5%
Poecilia formosa	Amazon Molly	Cyprinodontiformes	435	XP_007550061.1	569	26.7%	37.5%
