= BRCA1 =

Gene known for its role in breast cancer

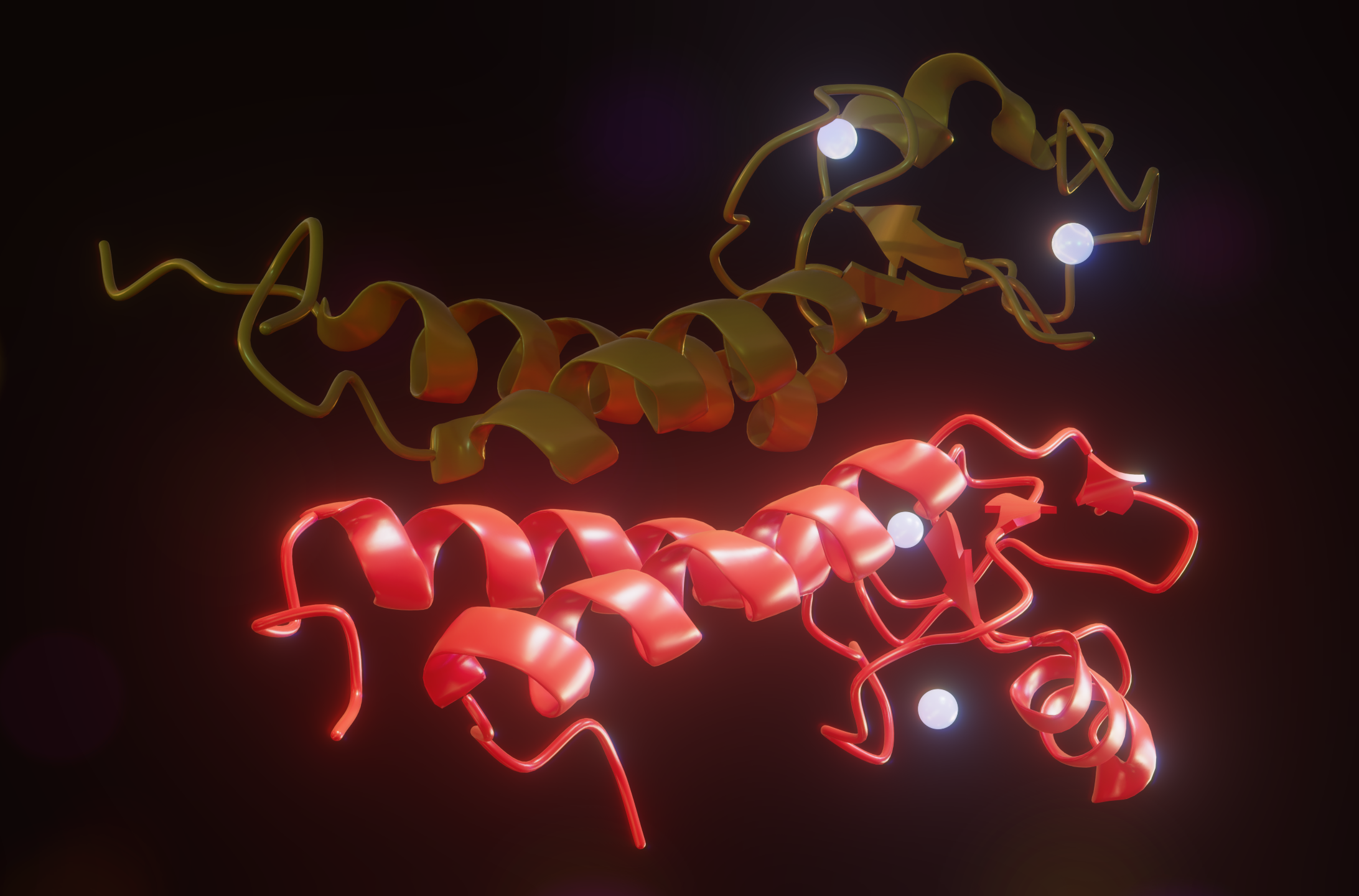

Identifiers
- Aliases: BRCA1, breast cancer 1, early onset, BRCAI, BRCC1, BROVCA1, IRIS, PNCA4, PPP1R53, PSCP, RNF53, FANCS, breast cancer 1, DNA repair associated, BRCA1 DNA repair associated, Genes
- External IDs: OMIM: 113705; MGI: 104537; GeneCards: BRCA1
Available structures
PDB	Ortholog search: PDBe RCSB
PDB	List of PDB id codes 1JM7, 1JNX, 1N5O, 1OQA, 1T15, 1T29, 1T2U, 1T2V, 1Y98, 2ING, 3COJ, 3K0H, 3K0K, 3K15, 3PXA, 3PXB, 3PXC, 3PXD, 3PXE, 4IFI, 4IGK, 4JLU, 4OFB, 4U4A, 4Y18, 4Y2G
Enzyme activity
EC #	BRENDA	ExPASy	KEGG	MetaCyc
2.3.2.27	↗	↗	↗	↗

Gene location (Human)
Chr.	Chromosome 17 (human)
Band	17q21.31	Start	43,044,295 bp
Band	17q21.31	End	43,170,245 bp

Gene location (Mouse)
Chr.	Chromosome 11 (mouse)
Band	11 65.18 cM|11 D	Start	101,379,590 bp
Band	11 65.18 cM|11 D	End	101,442,781 bp
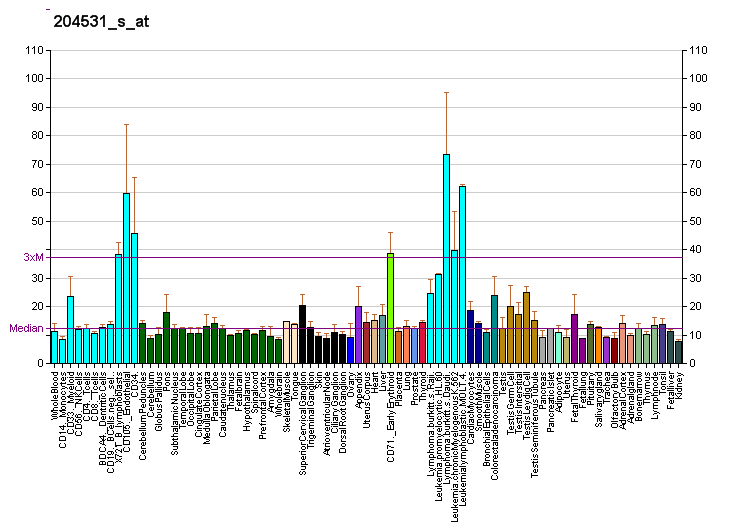

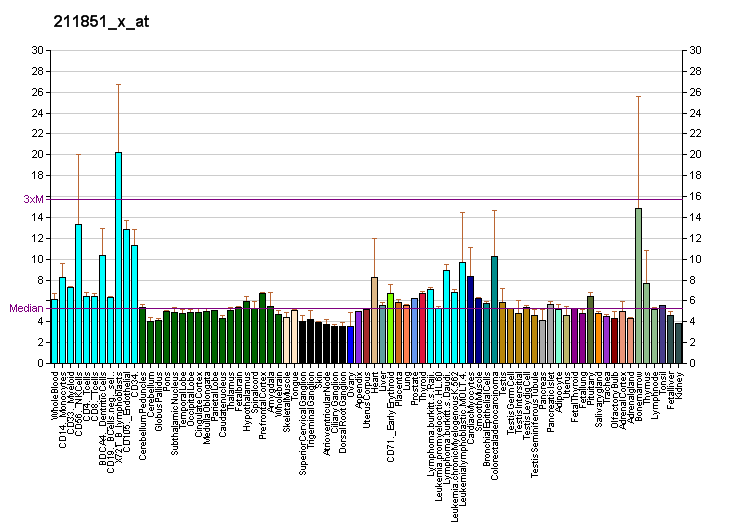
RNA expression pattern
Bgee	Human / Mouse (ortholog); Top expressed in: ventricular zone; testicle; gonad; ganglionic eminence; secondary oocyte; bone marrow cell; sural nerve; trabecular bone; stromal cell of endometrium; epithelium of colon / Top expressed in: secondary oocyte; primary oocyte; zygote; genital tubercle; tail of embryo; primitive streak; lumbar spinal ganglion; maxillary prominence; fetal liver hematopoietic progenitor cell; mandibular prominence; More reference expression data
BioGPS	More reference expression data
Gene ontology
Molecular function	tubulin binding; metal ion binding; enzyme binding; zinc ion binding; damaged DNA binding; protein binding; transcription coactivator activity; androgen receptor binding; RNA binding; ubiquitin protein ligase binding; ubiquitin-protein transferase activity; DNA binding; transferase activity; RNA polymerase binding; identical protein binding
Cellular component	BRCA1-BARD1 complex; condensed nuclear chromosome; BRCA1-A complex; ubiquitin ligase complex; plasma membrane; nucleoplasm; condensed chromosome; cytoplasm; chromosome; nucleus; lateral element; protein-containing complex; ribonucleoprotein complex
Biological process	response to ionizing radiation; centrosome cycle; chromosome segregation; protein K6-linked ubiquitination; intrinsic apoptotic signaling pathway in response to DNA damage; cell cycle; double-strand break repair via nonhomologous end joining; apoptotic process; regulation of apoptotic process; regulation of gene expression by genetic imprinting; regulation of transcription, DNA-templated; negative regulation of fatty acid biosynthetic process; transcription, DNA-templated; regulation of transcription by RNA polymerase III; fatty acid biosynthetic process; regulation of DNA methylation; negative regulation of intracellular estrogen receptor signaling pathway; protein autoubiquitination; positive regulation of histone H3-K9 methylation; DNA recombination; positive regulation of angiogenesis; response to estrogen; cellular response to indole-3-methanol; negative regulation of extrinsic apoptotic signaling pathway via death domain receptors; negative regulation of transcription, DNA-templated; positive regulation of protein ubiquitination; androgen receptor signaling pathway; negative regulation of centriole replication; postreplication repair; lipid metabolism; cellular response to tumor necrosis factor; positive regulation of DNA repair; fatty acid metabolic process; positive regulation of gene expression; negative regulation of histone H3-K4 methylation; regulation of cell population proliferation; negative regulation of reactive oxygen species metabolic process; positive regulation of vascular endothelial growth factor production; DNA damage response, signal transduction by p53 class mediator resulting in transcription of p21 class mediator; positive regulation of transcription by RNA polymerase II; positive regulation of histone H4-K20 methylation; DNA double-strand break processing; double-strand break repair via homologous recombination; negative regulation of histone acetylation; protein ubiquitination; positive regulation of histone H3-K4 methylation; DNA repair; double-strand break repair; positive regulation of histone acetylation; dosage compensation by inactivation of X chromosome; negative regulation of histone H3-K9 methylation; positive regulation of histone H3-K9 acetylation; positive regulation of transcription, DNA-templated; chordate embryonic development; positive regulation of histone H4-K16 acetylation; cellular response to DNA damage stimulus; protein deubiquitination; DNA replication; mitotic G2/M transition checkpoint; regulation of transcription by RNA polymerase II; negative regulation of G0 to G1 transition; transcription by RNA polymerase II; mitotic G2 DNA damage checkpoint signaling; regulation of signal transduction by p53 class mediator
Sources:Amigo / QuickGO
Orthologs
Databases	NCBI: entry; OMA: entry
Species	Human	Mouse
Entrez	672	12189
Ensembl	ENSG00000012048	ENSMUSG00000017146
UniProt	P38398	P48754
RefSeq (mRNA)	NM_007294; NM_007295; NM_007296; NM_007297; NM_007298 NM_007299; NM_007300; NM_007301; NM_007302; NM_007303; NM_007305; NM_007306	NM_009764
RefSeq (protein)	NP_009225; NP_009228; NP_009229; NP_009230; NP_009231	NP_033894
Location (UCSC)	Chr 17: 43.04 – 43.17 Mb	Chr 11: 101.38 – 101.44 Mb
PubMed search
- Wikidata
View/Edit Human	View/Edit Mouse

Breast cancer type 1 susceptibility protein is a protein that in humans is encoded by the BRCA1 (/ˌbrækəˈwʌn/) gene. Orthologs are common in other vertebrate species, whereas invertebrate genomes may encode a more distantly related gene. BRCA1 is a caretaker gene (responsible for repairing DNA), a type of tumor suppressor gene.

BRCA1 and BRCA2 are unrelated proteins, but both are normally expressed in the cells of breast and other tissues, where they help repair damaged DNA, or destroy cells if DNA cannot be repaired. They are involved in the repair of chromosomal damage with an important role in the error-free repair of DNA double-strand breaks. If BRCA1 or BRCA2 itself is damaged by a BRCA mutation, damaged DNA is not repaired properly, and this increases the risk for breast cancer. BRCA1 and BRCA2 have been described as "breast cancer susceptibility genes" and "breast cancer susceptibility proteins". The predominant allele has a normal, tumor-suppressive function, whereas high penetrance mutations in these genes cause a loss of tumor-suppressive function, which correlates with an increased risk of breast cancer.

BRCA1 combines with other tumor suppressors, DNA damage sensors and signal transducers to form a large multi-subunit protein complex known as the BRCA1-associated genome surveillance complex (BASC). The BRCA1 protein associates with RNA polymerase II, and through the C-terminal domain, also interacts with histone deacetylase complexes. Thus, this protein plays a role in transcription, and DNA repair of double-strand DNA breaks ubiquitination, transcriptional regulation as well as other functions.

Methods to test for the likelihood of a patient with mutations in BRCA1 and BRCA2 developing cancer were covered by patents owned or controlled by Myriad Genetics. Myriad's business model of offering the diagnostic test exclusively led from Myriad being a startup in 1994 to being a publicly traded company with 1200 employees and about $500 million in annual revenue in 2012; it also led to controversy over high prices and the inability to obtain second opinions from other diagnostic labs, which in turn led to the landmark Association for Molecular Pathology v. Myriad Genetics lawsuit.

== Discovery ==
The chromosomal location of BRCA1 was discovered by Mary-Claire King's team at UC Berkeley in 1990. After an international race to refine the precise location of BRCA1, the gene was cloned in 1994 by scientists at University of Utah, National Institute of Environmental Health Sciences (NIEHS) and Myriad Genetics.

== Gene ==
BRCA1 orthologs have been identified in most vertebrates for which complete genome data are available.

== Protein structure ==
The BRCA1 protein contains the following domains:

- Zinc finger, C3HC4 type (RING finger)
- BRCA1 C Terminus (BRCT) domain

This protein also contains nuclear localization signals and nuclear export signal motifs.

The human BRCA1 protein consists of four major protein domains: the Znf C3HC4- RING domain, the BRCA1 serine domain and two BRCT domains. These domains encode approximately 27% of BRCA1 protein. There are six known isoforms of BRCA1, with isoforms 1 and 2 comprising 1863 amino acids each.

BRCA1 is unrelated to BRCA2, i.e. they are not homologs or paralogs.

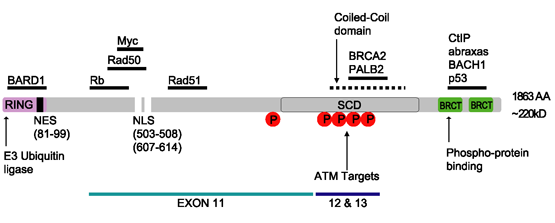
Domain map of BRCA1; RING, serine containing domain (SCD), and BRCT domains are indicated. Horizontal black lines indicate protein-binding domains for the listed partners. Red circles mark phosphorylation sites.

=== Zinc RING finger domain ===
The RING motif, a Zn finger found in eukaryotic peptides, is 40–60 amino acids long and consists of eight conserved metal-binding residues, two quartets of cysteine or histidine residues that coordinate two zinc atoms. This motif contains a short anti-parallel beta-sheet, two zinc-binding loops and a central alpha helix in a small domain. This RING domain interacts with associated proteins, including BARD1, which also contains a RING motif, to form a heterodimer. The BRCA1 RING motif is flanked by alpha helices formed by residues 8–22 and 81–96 of the BRCA1 protein. It interacts with a homologous region in BARD1 also consisting of a RING finger flanked by two alpha-helices formed from residues 36–48 and 101–116. These four helices combine to form a heterodimerization interface and stabilize the BRCA1-BARD1 heterodimer complex. Additional stabilization is achieved by interactions between adjacent residues in the flanking region and hydrophobic interactions. The BARD1/BRCA1 interaction is disrupted by tumorigenic amino acid substitutions in BRCA1, implying that the formation of a stable complex between these proteins may be an essential aspect of BRCA1 tumor suppression.

The RING domain is an important element of ubiquitin E3 ligases, which catalyze protein ubiquitination. Ubiquitin is a small regulatory protein found in all tissues that directs proteins to compartments within the cell. BRCA1 polypeptides, in particular, Lys-48-linked polyubiquitin chains are dispersed throughout the resting cell nucleus, but at the start of DNA replication, they gather in restrained groups that also contain BRCA2 and BARD1. BARD1 is thought to be involved in the recognition and binding of protein targets for ubiquitination. It attaches to proteins and labels them for destruction. Ubiquitination occurs via the BRCA1 fusion protein and is abolished by zinc chelation. The enzyme activity of the fusion protein is dependent on the proper folding of the RING domain.

=== Serine cluster domain ===
BRCA1 serine cluster domain (SCD) spans amino acids 1280–1524. A portion of the domain is located in exons 11–13. High rates of mutation occur in exons 11–13. Reported phosphorylation sites of BRCA1 are concentrated in the SCD, where they are phosphorylated by ATM/ATR kinases both in vitro and in vivo. ATM/ATR are kinases activated by DNA damage. Mutation of serine residues may affect the localization of BRCA1 to sites of DNA damage and DNA damage response.

=== BRCT domains ===
The dual repeat BRCT domain of the BRCA1 protein is an elongated structure approximately 70 Å long and 30–35 Å wide. The 85–95 amino acid domains in BRCT can be found as single modules or as multiple tandem repeats containing two domains. Both of these possibilities can occur in a single protein in a variety of different conformations. The C-terminal BRCT region of the BRCA1 protein is essential for repair of DNA, transcription regulation, and tumor-suppressor function. In BRCA1, the dual tandem repeat BRCT domains are arranged in a head-to-tail fashion in the three-dimensional structure, burying 1600 Å of hydrophobic, solvent-accessible surface area in the interface. These all contribute to the tightly packed knob-in-hole structure that comprises the interface. These homologous domains interact to control cellular responses to DNA damage. A missense mutation at the interface of these two proteins can perturb the cell cycle, resulting in a greater risk of developing cancer.

== Function and mechanism ==
BRCA1 is part of a complex that repairs double-strand breaks in DNA. The strands of the DNA double helix are continuously breaking as they become damaged. Sometimes only one strand is broken, sometimes both strands are broken simultaneously. DNA cross-linking agents are an important source of chromosome/DNA damage. Double-strand breaks occur as intermediates after the crosslinks are removed, and indeed, biallelic mutations in BRCA1 have been identified to be responsible for Fanconi Anemia, Complementation Group S (FA-S), a genetic disease associated with hypersensitivity to DNA crosslinking agents. BRCA1 is part of a protein complex that repairs DNA when both strands are broken. When this happens, it is difficult for the repair mechanism to "know" how to replace the correct DNA sequence, and there are multiple ways to attempt the repair. The double-strand repair mechanism in which BRCA1 participates is homology-directed repair, where the repair proteins copy the identical sequence from the intact sister chromatid. FA-S is almost always a lethal condition in utero; only a handful cases of biallelic BRCA1 mutations have been reported in literature despite the high carrier frequencies in the Ashkenazim, and none since 2013.

In the nucleus of many types of normal cells, the BRCA1 protein interacts with RAD51 during repair of DNA double-strand breaks. These breaks can be caused by natural radiation or other exposures, but also occur when chromosomes exchange genetic material (homologous recombination, e.g., "crossing over" during meiosis). The BRCA2 protein, which has a function similar to that of BRCA1, also interacts with the RAD51 protein. By influencing DNA damage repair, these three proteins play a role in maintaining the stability of the human genome.

BRCA1 is also involved in another type of DNA repair, termed mismatch repair. BRCA1 interacts with the DNA mismatch repair protein MSH2. MSH2, MSH6, PARP, and some other proteins involved in single-strand repair are reported to be elevated in BRCA1-deficient mammary tumors.

A protein called valosin-containing protein (VCP, also known as p97) plays a role in recruiting BRCA1 to the damaged DNA sites. After ionizing radiation, VCP is recruited to DNA lesions and cooperates with the ubiquitin ligase RNF8 to orchestrate assembly of signaling complexes for efficient DSB repair. BRCA1 interacts with VCP. BRCA1 also interacts with c-Myc, and other proteins that are critical to maintain genome stability.

BRCA1 directly binds to DNA, with a higher affinity for branched DNA structures. This ability to bind to DNA contributes to its ability to inhibit the nuclease activity of the MRN complex as well as the nuclease activity of Mre11 alone. This may explain a role for BRCA1 to promote lower fidelity DNA repair by non-homologous end joining (NHEJ). BRCA1 also colocalizes with γ-H2AX (histone H2AX phosphorylated on serine-139) in DNA double-strand break repair foci, indicating it may play a role in recruiting repair factors.

Formaldehyde and acetaldehyde are common environmental sources of DNA cross-links that often require repairs mediated by BRCA1-containing pathways.

This DNA repair function is essential; mice with loss-of-function mutations in both BRCA1 alleles are not viable, and as of 2015, only two adults were known to have loss-of-function mutations in both alleles (leading to FA-S); both had congenital or developmental issues, and both had cancer. One was presumed to have survived to adulthood because one of the BRCA1 mutations was hypomorphic.

=== Transcription ===
BRCA1 was shown to co-purify with the human RNA polymerase II holoenzyme in HeLa extracts, implying it is a component of the holoenzyme. Later research, however, contradicted this assumption, instead showing that the predominant complex including BRCA1 in HeLa cells is a 2 megadalton complex containing SWI/SNF. SWI/SNF is a chromatin remodeling complex. Artificial tethering of BRCA1 to chromatin was shown to decondense heterochromatin, though the SWI/SNF interacting domain was not necessary for this role. BRCA1 interacts with the NELF-B (COBRA1) subunit of the NELF complex.

== Mutations and cancer risk ==
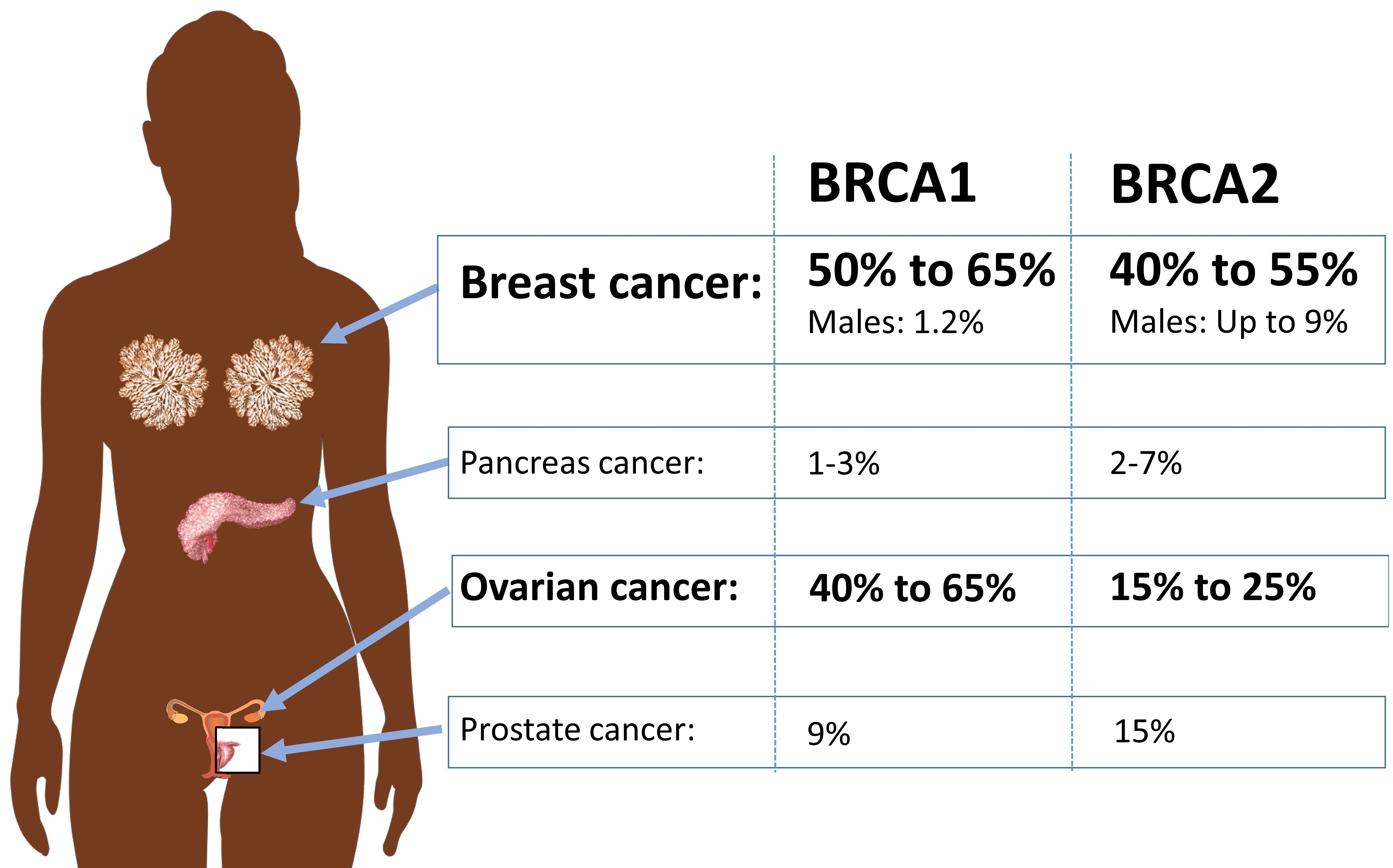
Absolute risk of cancers in BRCA1 or BRCA2 mutation.

Certain variations of the BRCA1 gene lead to an increased risk for breast cancer as part of a hereditary breast–ovarian cancer syndrome. Researchers have identified hundreds of mutations in the BRCA1 gene, many of which are associated with an increased risk of cancer. Females with an abnormal BRCA1 or BRCA2 gene have up to an 80% risk of developing breast cancer by age 90; increased risk of developing ovarian cancer is about 55% for females with BRCA1 mutations and about 25% for females with BRCA2 mutations.

These mutations can be changes in one or a small number of DNA base pairs (the building blocks of DNA), and can be identified with PCR and DNA sequencing.

In some cases, large segments of DNA are rearranged. Those large segments, also called large rearrangements, can be a deletion or a duplication of one or several exons in the gene. Classical methods for mutation detection (sequencing) are unable to reveal these types of mutation. Other methods have been proposed: traditional quantitative PCR, multiplex ligation-dependent probe amplification (MLPA), and Quantitative Multiplex PCR of Short Fluorescent Fragments (QMPSF). Newer methods have also been recently proposed: heteroduplex analysis (HDA) by multi-capillary electrophoresis or also dedicated oligonucleotide array based on comparative genomic hybridization (array-CGH).

Some results suggest that hypermethylation of the BRCA1 promoter, which has been reported in some cancers, could be considered as an inactivating mechanism for BRCA1 expression.

A mutated BRCA1 gene usually makes a protein that does not function properly. Researchers believe that the defective BRCA1 protein is unable to help fix DNA damage, leading to mutations in other genes. These mutations can accumulate and may allow cells to grow and divide uncontrollably to form a tumor. Thus, BRCA1 inactivating mutations lead to a predisposition for cancer.

BRCA1 mRNA 3' UTR can be bound by an miRNA, Mir-17 microRNA. It has been suggested that variations in this miRNA, along with Mir-30 microRNA could confer susceptibility to breast cancer.

In addition to breast cancer, mutations in the BRCA1 gene also increase the risk of ovarian and prostate cancers. Moreover, precancerous lesions (dysplasia) within the fallopian tube have been linked to BRCA1 gene mutations. Pathogenic mutations anywhere in a model pathway containing BRCA1 and BRCA2 greatly increase risks for a subset of leukemias and lymphomas.

Women who have inherited a defective BRCA1 or BRCA2 gene are at a greatly elevated risk of developing breast and ovarian cancer. Their risk of developing breast and/or ovarian cancer is so high, and so specific to those cancers, that many mutation carriers choose to have prophylactic surgery. There has been much conjecture to explain such striking tissue specificity. Major determinants of where BRCA1/2 hereditary cancers occur are related to tissue specificity of the cancer pathogen, the agent that causes chronic inflammation, or the carcinogen. The target tissue may have receptors for the pathogen, may become selectively exposed to an inflammatory process, or a carcinogen. An innate genomic deficit in a tumor suppressor gene impairs normal responses and exacerbates the susceptibility to disease in organ targets. This theory also fits data for several tumor suppressors beyond BRCA1 or BRCA2. A major advantage of this model is that it suggests there may be some options in addition to prophylactic surgery.

As aforementioned, biallelic and homozygous inheritance of the BRCA1 gene leads to FA-S, which is almost always an embryonically lethal condition.

== Low expression of BRCA1 in breast and ovarian cancers ==
BRCA1 expression is reduced or undetectable in the majority of high-grade, ductal breast cancers. It has long been noted that loss of BRCA1 activity, either by germ-line mutations or by down-regulation of gene expression, leads to tumor formation in specific target tissues. In particular, decreased BRCA1 expression contributes to both sporadic and inherited breast tumor progression. Reduced expression of BRCA1 is tumorigenic because it plays an important role in the repair of DNA damages, especially double-strand breaks, by the potentially error-free pathway of homologous recombination. Since cells that lack the BRCA1 protein tend to repair DNA damages by alternative more error-prone mechanisms, the reduction or silencing of this protein generates mutations and gross chromosomal rearrangements that can lead to progression to breast cancer.

Similarly, BRCA1 expression is low in the majority (55%) of sporadic epithelial ovarian cancers (EOCs) where EOCs are the most common type of ovarian cancer, representing approximately 90% of ovarian cancers. In serous ovarian carcinomas, a sub-category constituting about 2/3 of EOCs, low BRCA1 expression occurs in more than 50% of cases. Bowtell reviewed the literature indicating that deficient homologous recombination repair caused by BRCA1 deficiency is tumorigenic. In particular, this deficiency initiates a cascade of molecular events that sculpt the evolution of high-grade serous ovarian cancer and dictate its response to therapy. Especially noted was that BRCA1 deficiency could be the cause of tumorigenesis, whether due to BRCA1 mutation or any other event that causes a deficiency of BRCA1 expression.

In addition to its role in repairing DNA damages, BRCA1 facilitates apoptosis in breast and ovarian cell lines when cells are stressed by agents, including ionizing radiation, that cause DNA damages. Repair of DNA damages and apoptosis are two enzymatic processes essential for maintaining genome integrity in humans. Cells that are deficient in DNA repair tend to accumulate DNA damages, and when such cells are also defective in apoptosis, they tend to survive even with excess DNA damage. Replication of DNA in such cells leads to mutations and these mutations may cause cancer. Thus, BRCA1 appears to have two roles related to the prevention of cancer, where one role is to promote repair of a specific class of damages and the second role is to induce apoptosis if the level of such DNA damage is beyond the cell's repair capability

=== Mutation of BRCA1 in breast and ovarian cancer ===
Only about 3%–8% of all women with breast cancer carry a mutation in BRCA1 or BRCA2. Similarly, BRCA1 mutations are only seen in about 18% of ovarian cancers (13% germline mutations and 5% somatic mutations).

Thus, while BRCA1 expression is low in the majority of these cancers, BRCA1 mutation is not a major cause of reduced expression. Certain latent viruses, which are frequently detected in breast cancer tumors, can decrease the expression of the BRCA1 gene and cause the development of breast tumors.

=== BRCA1 promoter hypermethylation in breast and ovarian cancer ===
BRCA1 promoter hypermethylation was present in only 13% of unselected primary breast carcinomas. Similarly, BRCA1 promoter hypermethylation was present in only 5% to 15% of EOC cases.

Thus, while BRCA1 expression is low in these cancers, BRCA1 promoter methylation is only a minor cause of reduced expression.

=== MicroRNA repression of BRCA1 in breast cancers ===
There are several specific microRNAs, when overexpressed, that directly reduce expression of specific DNA repair proteins (see MicroRNA section DNA repair and cancer) In the case of breast cancer, microRNA-182 (miR-182) specifically targets BRCA1. Breast cancers can be classified based on receptor status or histology, with triple-negative breast cancer (15%–25% of breast cancers), HER2+ (15%–30% of breast cancers), ER+/PR+ (about 70% of breast cancers), and Invasive lobular carcinoma (about 5%–10% of invasive breast cancer). All four types of breast cancer were found to have an average of about 100-fold increase in miR-182, compared to normal breast tissue. In breast cancer cell lines, there is an inverse correlation of BRCA1 protein levels with miR-182 expression. Thus, it appears that much of the reduction or absence of BRCA1 in high-grade ductal breast cancers may be due to over-expressed miR-182.

In addition to miR-182, a pair of almost identical microRNAs, miR-146a and miR-146b-5p, also repress BRCA1 expression. These two microRNAs are over-expressed in triple-negative tumors and their over-expression results in BRCA1 inactivation. Thus, miR-146a and/or miR-146b-5p may also contribute to reduced expression of BRCA1 in these triple-negative breast cancers.

=== MicroRNA repression of BRCA1 in ovarian cancers ===
In both serous tubal intraepithelial carcinoma (the precursor lesion to high grade serous ovarian carcinoma (HG-SOC)), and in HG-SOC itself, miR-182 is overexpressed in about 70% of cases. In cells with over-expressed miR-182, BRCA1 remained low, even after exposure to ionizing radiation (which normally raises BRCA1 expression). Thus, much of the reduced or absent BRCA1 in HG-SOC may be due to over-expressed miR-182.

Another microRNA known to reduce the expression of BRCA1 in ovarian cancer cells is miR-9. Among 58 tumors from patients with stage IIIC or stage IV serous ovarian cancers (HG-SOG), an inverse correlation was found between expressions of miR-9 and BRCA1, so that increased miR-9 may also contribute to reduced expression of BRCA1 in these ovarian cancers.

=== Deficiency of BRCA1 expression is likely tumorigenic ===
DNA damage appears to be the primary underlying cause of cancer, and deficiencies in DNA repair appear to underlie many forms of cancer. If DNA repair is deficient, DNA damage tends to accumulate. Such excess DNA damage may increase mutational errors during DNA replication due to error-prone translesion synthesis. Excess DNA damage may also increase epigenetic alterations due to errors during DNA repair. Such mutations and epigenetic alterations may give rise to cancer. The frequent microRNA-induced deficiency of BRCA1 in breast and ovarian cancers likely contributes to the progression of those cancers.

== Germ-line mutations and founder effect ==
All germ-line BRCA1 mutations identified to date have been inherited, suggesting the possibility of a large "founder" effect in which a certain mutation is common to a well-defined population group and can, in theory, be traced back to a common ancestor. Given the complexity of mutation screening for BRCA1, these common mutations may simplify the methods required for mutation screening in certain populations. Analysis of mutations that occur with high frequency also permits the study of their clinical expression. Examples of manifestations of a founder effect are seen among Ashkenazi Jews. Three mutations in BRCA1 have been reported to account for the majority of Ashkenazi Jewish patients with inherited BRCA1-related breast and/or ovarian cancer: 185delAG, 188del11, and 5382insC in the BRCA1 gene. In fact, it has been shown that if a Jewish woman does not carry a BRCA1 185delAG, BRCA1 5382insC founder mutation, it is highly unlikely that a different BRCA1 mutation will be found. Additional examples of founder mutations in BRCA1 are given in Table 1 (mainly derived from).

Population or subgroup	BRCA1 mutation(s)!! Reference(s)
African-Americans	943ins10, M1775R
Afrikaners	E881X, 1374delC
Ashkenazi Jewish	185delAG, 188del11, 5382insC
Austrians	2795delA, C61G, 5382insC, Q1806stop
Belgians	2804delAA, IVS5+3A>G
Dutch	Exon 2 deletion, exon 13 deletion, 2804delAA
Finns	3745delT, IVS11-2A>G
French	3600del11, G1710X
French Canadians	C4446T
Germans	5382insC, 4184del4
Greeks	5382insC
Hungarians	300T>G, 5382insC, 185delAG
Italians	5083del19
Japanese	L63X, Q934X
Native North Americans	1510insG, 1506A>G
Northern Irish	2800delAA
Norwegians	816delGT, 1135insA, 1675delA, 3347delAG
Pakistanis	2080insA, 3889delAG, 4184del4, 4284delAG, IVS14-1A>G
Poles	300T>G, 5382insC, C61G, 4153delA
Russians	5382insC, 4153delA
Scots	2800delAA
Spaniards	R71G
Swedes	Q563X, 3171ins5, 1201del11, 2594delC

== Female fertility ==
As women age, reproductive performance declines, leading to menopause. This decline is tied to a reduction in the number of ovarian follicles. Although about 1 million oocytes are present at birth in the human ovary, only about 500 (about 0.05%) of these ovulate. The decline in ovarian reserve appears to occur at a constantly increasing rate with age, and leads to nearly complete exhaustion of the reserve by about age 52. As ovarian reserve and fertility decline with age, there is also a parallel increase in pregnancy failure and meiotic errors, resulting in chromosomally abnormal conceptions.

Women with a germ-line BRCA1 mutation appear to have a diminished oocyte reserve and decreased fertility compared to normally aging women. Furthermore, women with an inherited BRCA1 mutation undergo menopause prematurely. Since BRCA1 is a key DNA repair protein, these findings suggest that naturally occurring DNA damages in oocytes are repaired less efficiently in women with a BRCA1 defect, and that this repair inefficiency leads to early reproductive failure.

As noted above, the BRCA1 protein plays a key role in homologous recombinational repair. This is the only known cellular process that can accurately repair DNA double-strand breaks. DNA double-strand breaks accumulate with age in humans and mice in primordial follicles. Primordial follicles contain oocytes that are at an intermediate (prophase I) stage of meiosis. Meiosis is the general process in eukaryotic organisms by which germ cells are formed, and it is likely an adaptation for removing DNA damages, especially double-strand breaks, from germ line DNA. (Also see article Meiosis). Homologous recombinational repair employing BRCA1 is especially promoted during meiosis. It was found that expression of four key genes necessary for homologous recombinational repair of DNA double-strand breaks (BRCA1, MRE11, RAD51 and ATM) decline with age in the oocytes of humans and mice, leading to the hypothesis that DNA double-strand break repair is necessary for the maintenance of oocyte reserve and that a decline in efficiency of repair with age plays a role in ovarian aging.

== Cancer chemotherapy ==
Non-small cell lung cancer (NSCLC) is the leading cause of cancer deaths worldwide. At diagnosis, almost 70% of persons with NSCLC have locally advanced or metastatic disease. Persons with NSCLC are often treated with therapeutic platinum compounds (e.g., cisplatin, carboplatin, or oxaliplatin) that cause inter-strand cross-links in DNA. Among individuals with NSCLC, low expression of BRCA1 in the primary tumor correlated with improved survival after platinum-containing chemotherapy. This correlation implies that low BRCA1 in cancer, and the consequent low level of DNA repair, causes vulnerability of cancer to treatment by the DNA cross-linking agents. High BRCA1 may protect cancer cells by acting in a pathway that removes the DNA damage introduced by the platinum drugs. Thus, the level of BRCA1 expression is a potentially important tool for tailoring chemotherapy in lung cancer management.

The level of BRCA1 expression is also relevant to ovarian cancer treatment. Patients having sporadic ovarian cancer who were treated with platinum drugs had longer median survival times if their BRCA1 expression was low compared to patients with higher BRCA1 expression (46 compared to 33 months).

== Patents, enforcement, litigation, and controversy ==
A patent application for the isolated BRCA1 gene and cancer promoting mutations discussed above, as well as methods to diagnose the likelihood of getting breast cancer, was filed by the University of Utah, National Institute of Environmental Health Sciences (NIEHS) and Myriad Genetics in 1994; over the next year, Myriad, (in collaboration with investigators at Endo Recherche, Inc., HSC Research & Development Limited Partnership, and University of Pennsylvania), isolated and sequenced the BRCA2 gene and identified key mutations, and the first BRCA2 patent was filed in the U.S. by Myriad and other institutions in 1995. Myriad is the exclusive licensee of these patents and has enforced them in the US against clinical diagnostic labs. This business model led from Myriad being a startup in 1994 to being a publicly traded company with 1200 employees and about $500M in annual revenue in 2012; it also led to controversy over high prices and the inability to get second opinions from other diagnostic labs, which in turn led to the landmark Association for Molecular Pathology v. Myriad Genetics lawsuit. The patents began to expire in 2014.

According to an article published in the journal, Genetic Medicine, in 2010, "The patent story outside the United States is more complicated.... For example, patents have been obtained but the patents are being ignored by provincial health systems in Canada. In Australia and the UK, Myriad's licensee permitted use by health systems but announced a change of plans in August 2008. Only a single mutation has been patented in Myriad's lone European-wide patent, although some patents remain under review of an opposition proceeding. In effect, the United States is the only jurisdiction where Myriad's strong patent position has conferred sole-provider status." Peter Meldrum, CEO of Myriad Genetics, has acknowledged that Myriad has "other competitive advantages that may make such [patent] enforcement unnecessary" in Europe.

As with any gene, finding variation in BRCA1 is not hard. The real value comes from understanding what the clinical consequences of any particular variant are. Myriad has a large, proprietary database of such genotype-phenotype correlations. In response, parallel open-source databases are being developed.

Legal decisions surrounding the BRCA1 and BRCA2 patents will affect the field of genetic testing in general. A June 2013 article, in Association for Molecular Pathology v. Myriad Genetics (No. 12-398), quoted the US Supreme Court's unanimous ruling that, "A naturally occurring DNA segment is a product of nature and not patent eligible merely because it has been isolated," invalidating Myriad's patents on the BRCA1 and BRCA2 genes. However, the Court also held that manipulation of a gene to create something not found in nature could still be eligible for patent protection. The Federal Court of Australia came to the opposite conclusion, upholding the validity of an Australian Myriad Genetics patent over the BRCA1 gene in February 2013. The Federal Court also rejected an appeal in September 2014. Yvonne D'Arcy won her case against US-based biotech company Myriad Genetics in the High Court of Australia. In their unanimous decision on October 7, 2015, the "high court found that an isolated nucleic acid, coding for a BRCA1 protein, with specific variations from the norm that are indicative of susceptibility to breast cancer and ovarian cancer was not a 'patentable invention.'"

== Interactions ==
BRCA1 has been shown to interact with the following proteins:

- ABL1
- AKT1
- AR
- ATR
- ATM
- ATF1
- BACH1
- BARD1
- BRCA2
- BRCC3
- BRE
- BRIP1
- C-jun
- CHEK2
- CLSPN
- COBRA1
- CREBBP
- CSNK2B
- CSTF2
- CDK2
- DHX9
- ELK4
- EP300
- ESR1
- FANCA
- FANCD2
- FHL2
- H2AFX
- JUNB
- JunD
- LMO4
- MAP3K3
- MED17
- MED21
- MRE11A
- MSH2
- MSH3
- MSH6
- Myc
- NBN
- NMI
- NPM1
- NCOA2
- NUFIP1
- P53
- PALB2
- POLR2A
- PPP1CA
- Rad50
- RAD51
- RBBP4
- RBBP7
- RBBP8
- RELA
- RB1
- RBL1
- RBL2
- RPL31
- SMARCA4
- SMARCB1
- STAT1
- TOPBP1
- UBE2D1
- USF2
- VCP
- XIST
- ZNF350
