= 5,6-Dichloro-1-β-D-ribofuranosylbenzimidazole =

Names
- IUPAC name 5,6-Dichloro-1-(β-D-ribofuranosyl)-1H-1,3-benzimidazole
- Systematic IUPAC name (2R,3R,4S,5R)-2-(5,6-Dichloro-1H-1,3-benzimidazol-1-yl)-5-(hydroxymethyl)oxolane-3,4-diol
- Other names DRB, Dichlororibofuranosylbenzimidazole

Identifiers
CAS Number	53-85-0
3D model (JSmol)	Interactive image
ChEBI	CHEBI:49852
ChEMBL	ChEMBL375530
ChemSpider	5683
DrugBank	DB08473
IUPHAR/BPS	5178
PubChem CID	5894
UNII	8153319T3Q
CompTox Dashboard (EPA)	DTXSID50967472
- InChI: InChI=1S/C12H12Cl2N2O4/c13-5-1-7-8(2-6(5)14)16(4-15-7)12-11(19)10(18)9(3-17)20-12/h1-2,4,9-12,17-19H,3H2/t9-,10-,11-,12-/m1/s1 Key: XHSQDZXAVJRBMX-DDHJBXDOSA-N; InChI=1/C12H12Cl2N2O4/c13-5-1-7-8(2-6(5)14)16(4-15-7)12-11(19)10(18)9(3-17)20-12/h1-2,4,9-12,17-19H,3H2/t9-,10-,11-,12-/m1/s1 Key: XHSQDZXAVJRBMX-DDHJBXDOBF
- SMILES: Clc2cc1ncn(c1cc2Cl)[C@@H]3O[C@@H]([C@@H](O)[C@H]3O)CO

Properties
Chemical formula	C_{12}H_{12}Cl_{2}N_{2}O_{4}
Molar mass	319.14 g/mol
- Except where otherwise noted, data are given for materials in their standard state (at 25 °C [77 °F], 100 kPa). verify (what is ?) Infobox references

5,6-Dichloro-1-β-D-ribofuranosylbenzimidazole (DRB) is a chemical compound that inhibits transcription elongation by RNA Polymerase II. Sensitivity to DRB is dependent on DRB sensitivity inducing factor (DSIF), negative elongation factor (NELF), and positive transcription elongation factor b (P-TEFb). DRB is a nucleoside analog and also inhibits some protein kinases.
