= Negative elongation factor A =

Protein found in humans

NELFA

Identifiers
- Aliases: NELFA, NELF-A, WHSC2, P/OKcl.15, negative elongation factor complex member A
- External IDs: OMIM: 606026; MGI: 1346098; GeneCards: NELFA
Available structures
PDB	Ortholog search: PDBe RCSB
PDB	List of PDB id codes 5L3X

Gene location (Human)
Chr.	Chromosome 4 (human)
Band	4p16.3	Start	1,982,717 bp
Band	4p16.3	End	2,041,903 bp

Gene location (Mouse)
Chr.	Chromosome 5 (mouse)
Band	5|5 B2	Start	34,055,260 bp
Band	5|5 B2	End	34,093,757 bp
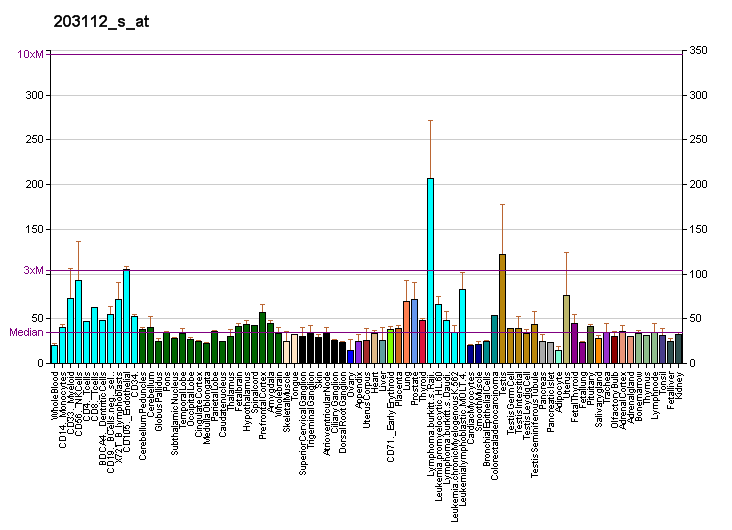

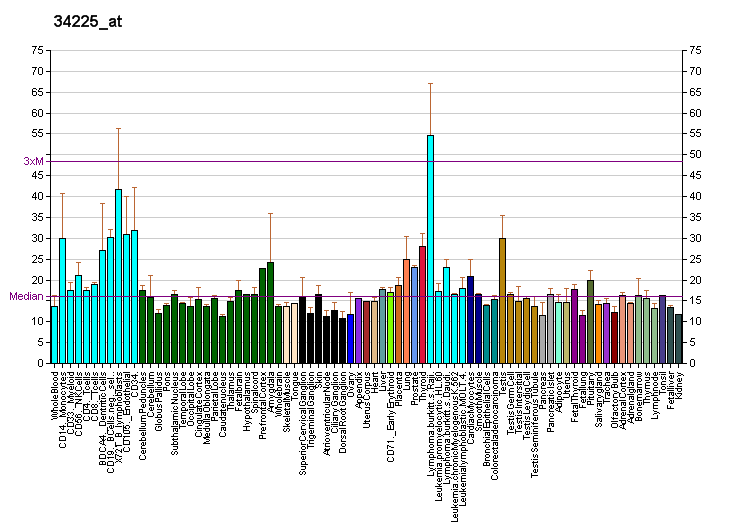
RNA expression pattern
Bgee	Human / Mouse (ortholog); Top expressed in: oocyte; secondary oocyte; right uterine tube; right hemisphere of cerebellum; mucosa of transverse colon; right testis; left testis; left ovary; skin of leg; right ovary / Top expressed in: secondary oocyte; zygote; primary oocyte; tail of embryo; genital tubercle; epiblast; neural tube; embryo; ventricular zone; embryo; More reference expression data
BioGPS	More reference expression data
Gene ontology
Molecular function	protein binding
Cellular component	nucleus; nucleoplasm; cytosol; nuclear body; NELF complex
Biological process	multicellular organism development; transcription elongation from RNA polymerase II promoter; regulation of transcription, DNA-templated; transcription by RNA polymerase II; transcription, DNA-templated; negative regulation of transcription elongation from RNA polymerase II promoter; positive regulation of viral transcription
Sources:Amigo / QuickGO
Orthologs
Databases	NCBI: entry; OMA: entry
Species	Human	Mouse
Entrez	7469	24116
Ensembl	ENSG00000185049	ENSMUSG00000029111
UniProt	Q9H3P2	Q8BG30
RefSeq (mRNA)	NM_005663	NM_011914
RefSeq (protein)	NP_005654	NP_036044
Location (UCSC)	Chr 4: 1.98 – 2.04 Mb	Chr 5: 34.06 – 34.09 Mb
PubMed search
- Wikidata
View/Edit Human	View/Edit Mouse

Negative elongation factor A (or NELF-A) is a protein that in humans is encoded by the NELFA gene (previously WHSC2). This protein is part of the negative elongation factor (NELF) complex, together with NELF-B, NELF-E, and either the C or D isoform of NELF-C/D. This complex interacts with RNA polymerase II-based transcriptional elongation and triggers transcriptional pausing. Though it was originally called "Wolf-Hirschhorn syndrome candidate 2", later research has indicated that it is actually not involved with Wolf-Hirschhorn syndrome.

== Function ==
This gene is expressed ubiquitously with higher levels in fetal than in adult tissues. It encodes a protein sharing 93% sequence identity with the mouse protein. Wolf-Hirschhorn syndrome (WHS) is a malformation syndrome associated with a hemizygous deletion of the distal short arm of chromosome 4. This gene is mapped to the 165 kb WHS critical region, and may play a role in the phenotype of the WHS or Pitt-Rogers-Danks syndrome. The encoded protein is found to be capable of reacting with HLA-A2-restricted and tumor-specific cytotoxic T lymphocytes, suggesting a target for use in specific immunotherapy for a large number of cancer patients. This protein has also been shown to be a member of the NELF (negative elongation factor) protein complex that participates in the regulation of RNA polymerase II transcription elongation. NELFA encodes the NELF-A subunit of the NELF complex.

== Interactions ==
NELF-A has been shown to interact with NELF-E.
