= Enhancer RNA =

Type of non-coding RNA molecule

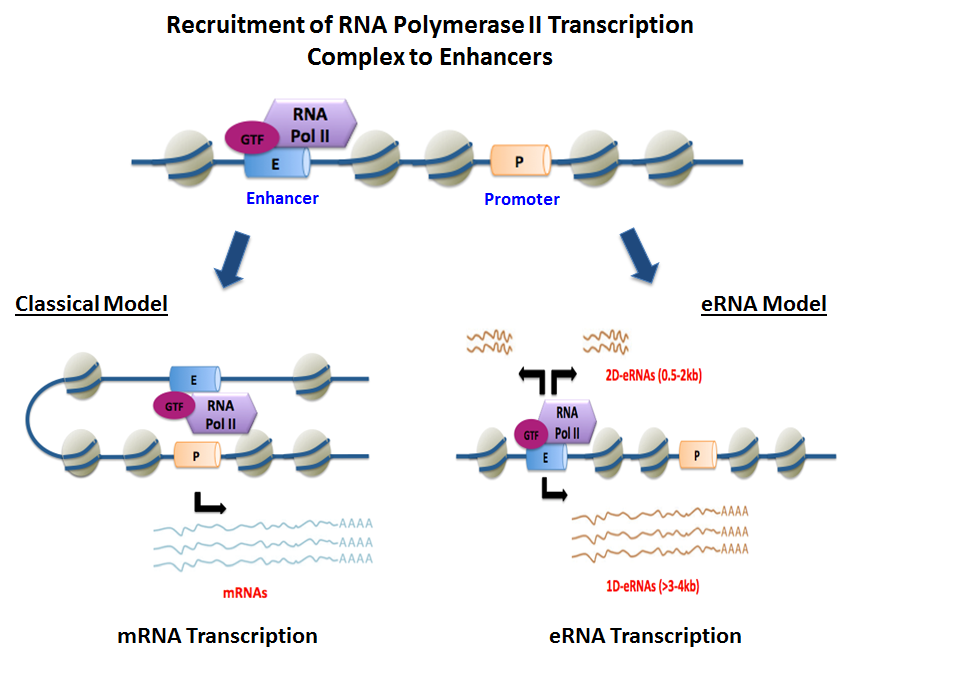

Enhancer RNAs (eRNAs) represent a class of relatively long non-coding RNA molecules (50–2000 nucleotides) transcribed from the DNA sequence of enhancer regions. They were first detected in 2010 through the use of genome-wide techniques such as RNA-seq and ChIP-seq. eRNAs can be subdivided into two main classes: 1D eRNAs and 2D eRNAs, which differ primarily in terms of their size, polyadenylation state, and transcriptional directionality. The expression of a given eRNA correlates with the activity of its corresponding enhancer in target genes. Increasing evidence suggests that eRNAs actively play a role in transcriptional regulation in cis and in trans, and while their mechanisms of action remain unclear, a few models have been proposed.

== Discovery ==
Enhancers as sites of extragenic transcription were initially discovered in genome-wide studies that identified enhancers as common regions of RNA polymerase II (RNA pol II) binding and non-coding RNA transcription. The level of RNA pol II–enhancer interaction and RNA transcript formation were found to be highly variable among these initial studies. Using explicit chromatin signature peaks, a significant proportion (~70%) of extragenic RNA Pol II transcription start sites were found to overlap enhancer sites in murine macrophages. Out of 12,000 neuronal enhancers in the mouse genome, almost 25% of the sites were found to bind RNA Pol II and generate transcripts. In parallel studies, 4,588 high confidence extragenic RNA Pol II binding sites were identified in murine macrophages stimulated with the inflammatory mediater lipopolysaccharide to induce transcription. These eRNAs, unlike messenger RNAs (mRNAs), lacked modification by polyadenylation, were generally short and non-coding, and were bidirectionally transcribed. Later studies revealed the transcription of another type of eRNAs, generated through unidirectional transcription, that were longer and contained a poly A tail. Furthermore, eRNA levels were correlated with mRNA levels of nearby genes, suggesting the potential regulatory and functional role of these non-coding enhancer RNA molecules.

== Biogenesis ==
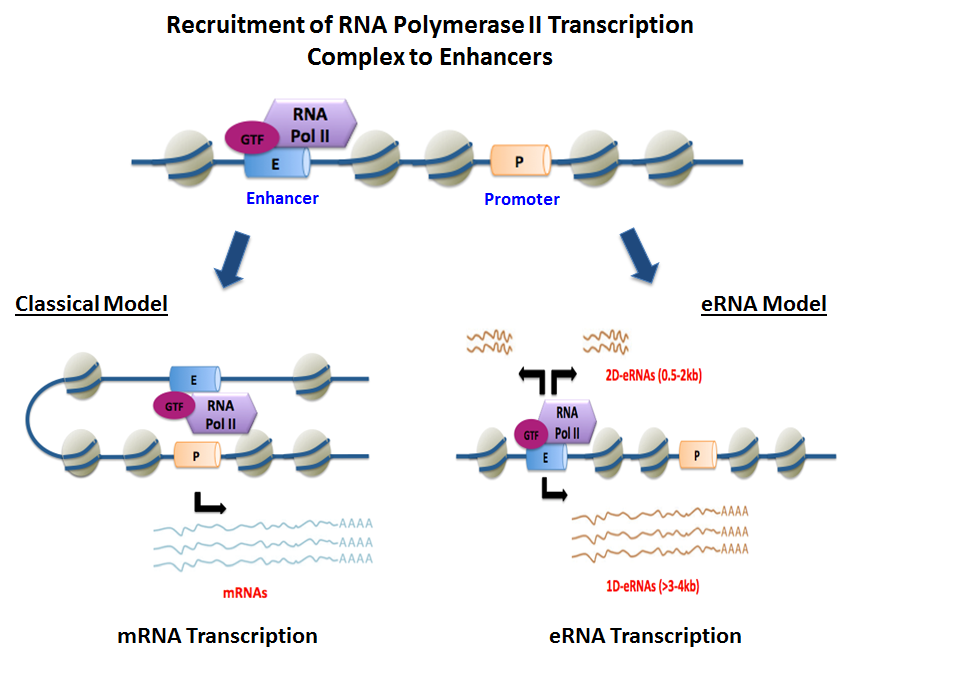
eRNA Biogenesis

=== Summary ===
eRNAs are transcribed from DNA sequences upstream and downstream of extragenic enhancer regions. Previously, several model enhancers have demonstrated the capability to directly recruit RNA Pol II and general transcription factors and form the pre-initiation complex (PIC) prior to the transcription start site at the promoter of genes. In certain cell types, activated enhancers have demonstrated the ability to both recruit RNA Pol II and also provide a template for active transcription of their local sequences.

Depending on the directionality of transcription, enhancer regions generate two different types of non-coding transcripts, 1D-eRNAs and 2D-eRNAs. The nature of the pre-initiation complex and specific transcription factors recruited to the enhancer may control the type of eRNAs generated. After transcription, the majority of eRNAs remain in the nucleus. In general, eRNAs are very unstable and actively degraded by the nuclear exosome. Not all enhancers are transcribed, with non-transcribed enhancers greatly outnumbering the transcribed ones in the order of magnitude of dozens of thousands in every given cell type.

=== 1D eRNAs ===
In most cases, unidirectional transcription of enhancer regions generates long (>4kb) and polyadenylated eRNAs. Enhancers that generate polyA+ eRNAs have a lower H3K4me1/me3 ratio in their chromatin signature than 2D-eRNAs. PolyA+ eRNAs are distinct from long multiexonic poly transcripts (meRNAs) that are generated by transcription initiation at intragenic enhancers. These long non-coding RNAs, which accurately reflect the host gene's structure except for the alternative first exon, display poor coding potential. As a result, polyA+ 1D-eRNAs may represent a mixed group of true enhancer-templated RNAs and multiexonic RNAs.

=== 2D eRNAs ===
Bidirectional transcription at enhancer sites generates comparatively shorter (0.5-2kb) and non-polyadenylated eRNAs. Enhancers that generate polyA- eRNAs have a chromatin signature with a higher H3K4me1/me3 ratio than 1D-eRNAs. In general, enhancer transcription and production of bidirectional eRNAs demonstrate a strong correlation of enhancer activity on gene transcription.

== Frequency and timing of eRNA expression ==
Arner et al. identified 65,423 transcribed enhancers (producing eRNA) among 33 different cell types under different conditions and different timings of stimulation. The transcription of enhancers generally preceded transcription of transcription factors which, in turn, generally preceded messenger RNA (mRNA) transcription of genes.

Carullo et al. examined one particular cell type, neurons (from primary neuron cultures). They exhibited 28,492 putative enhancers generating eRNAs. These eRNAs were often transcribed from both strands of the enhancer DNA in opposite directions. Carullo et al. used these cultured neurons to examine the timing of specific enhancer eRNAs compared to the mRNAs of their target genes. The cultured neurons were activated and RNA was isolated from those neurons at 0, 3.75, 5, 7.5, 15, 30, and 60 minutes after activation. In these experimental conditions, they found that 2 of the 5 enhancers of the immediate early gene (IEG) FOS, that is FOS enhancer 1 and FOS enhancer 3, became activated and initiated transcription of their eRNAs (eRNA1 and eRNA3). FOS eRNA1 and eRNA3 were significantly up-regulated within 7.5 minutes, whereas FOS mRNA was only upregulated 15 minutes after stimulation. Similar patterns occurred at IEGs FOSb and NR4A1, indicating that for many IEGs, eRNA induction precedes mRNA induction in response to neuronal activation.

While some enhancers can activate their target promoters at their target genes without transcribing eRNA, most active enhancers do transcribe eRNA during activation of their target promoters.

== Functions of eRNA found in the period 2013 to 2021 ==
The functions for eRNA described below have been reported in diverse biological systems, often demonstrated with a small number of specific enhancer-target gene pairs. It is not clear to what extent the functions of eRNA described here can be generalized to most eRNAs.

=== eRNAs in loop formation ===
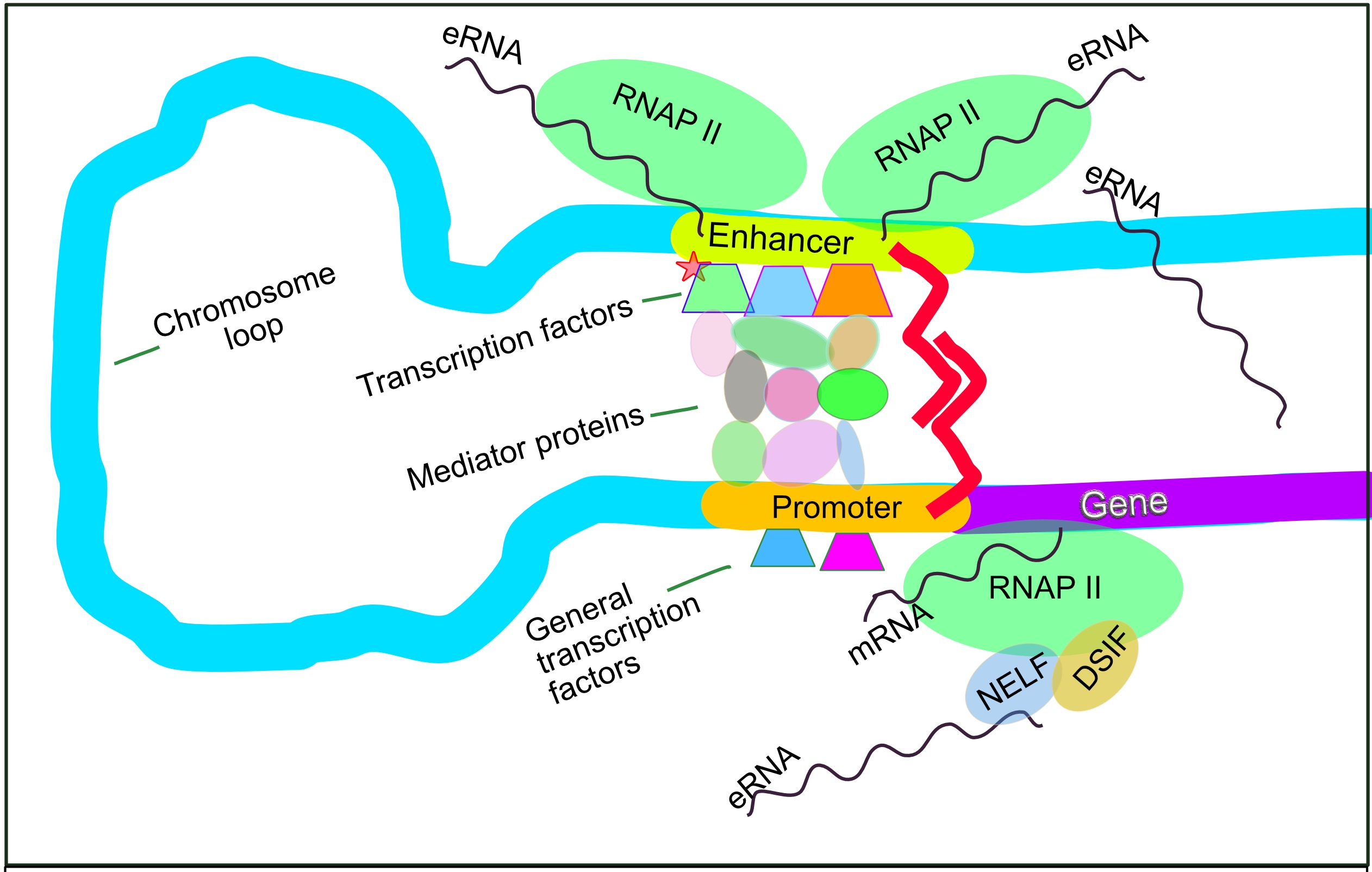
Regulatory elements, including Negative elongation factor (NELF) and enhancer RNA (eRNA) control transcription of a gene into messenger RNA in metazoans (animals). An active enhancer regulatory region of DNA is enabled to interact with the promoter DNA region of its target gene by the formation of a chromosome loop. This can initiate messenger RNA (mRNA) synthesis by RNA polymerase II (RNAP II) bound to the promoter at the transcription start site of the gene. The loop is stabilized by one architectural protein anchored to the enhancer and one anchored to the promoter and these proteins are joined to form a dimer (red zigzags). Specific regulatory transcription factors bind to DNA sequence motifs on the enhancer. General transcription factors bind to the promoter. When a transcription factor is activated by a signal (here indicated as phosphorylation shown by a small red star on a transcription factor on the enhancer) the enhancer is activated and can now activate its target promoter. The active enhancer is transcribed on each strand of DNA in opposite directions by bound RNAP IIs. Mediator (a complex consisting of about 26 proteins in an interacting structure) communicates regulatory signals from the enhancer DNA-bound transcription factors to the promoter. NELF, in complex with DSIF and RNAP II, can pause transcription. Interaction of eRNA with NELF may release NELF and allow productive elongation of mRNA. NELF can also be released if it is phosphorylated by P-TEFb

The chromosome loops shown in the figure, bringing an enhancer to the promoter of its target gene, may be directed and formed by the eRNA transcribed from the enhancer after the enhancer is activated.

A transcribed enhancer RNA (eRNA) interacting with the complex of Mediator proteins (see Figure), especially Mediator subunit 12 (MED12), appears to be essential in forming the chromosome loop that brings the enhancer into close association with the promoter of the target gene of the enhancer in the case of five genes studied by Lai et al. Hou and Kraus, describe two other studies reporting similar results. Arnold et al. review another 5 instances where eRNA is active in forming the enhancer-promoter loop.

=== eRNAs interact with proteins to affect transcription ===
One well-studied eRNA is the eRNA of the enhancer that interacts with the promoter of the prostate specific antigen (PSA) gene. The PSA eRNA is strongly up-regulated by the androgen receptor. High PSA eRNA then has a domino effect. PSA eRNA binds to and activates the positive transcription elongation factor P-TEFb protein complex which can then phosphorylate RNA polymerase II (RNAP II), initiating its activity in producing mRNA. P-TEFb can also phosphorylate the negative elongation factor NELF (which pauses RNAP II within 60 nucleotides after mRNA initiation begins). Phosphorylated NELF is released from RNAP II, then allowing RNAP II to have productive mRNA progression (see Figure). Up-regulated PSA eRNA thereby increases expression of 586 androgen receptor-responsive genes. Knockdown of PSA eRNA or deleting a set of nucleotides from PSA eRNA causes decreased presence of phosphorylated (active) RNAP II at these genes causing their reduced transcription.

The negative elongation factor NELF protein can also be released from its interaction with RNAP II by direct interaction with some eRNAs. Schaukowitch et al. showed that the eRNAs of two immediate early genes (IEGs) directly interacted with the NELF protein to release NELF from the RNAP II paused at the promoters of these two genes, allowing these two genes to then be expressed.

In addition, eRNAs appear to interact with as many as 30 other proteins.

== Proposed mechanisms of function up until 2013 ==
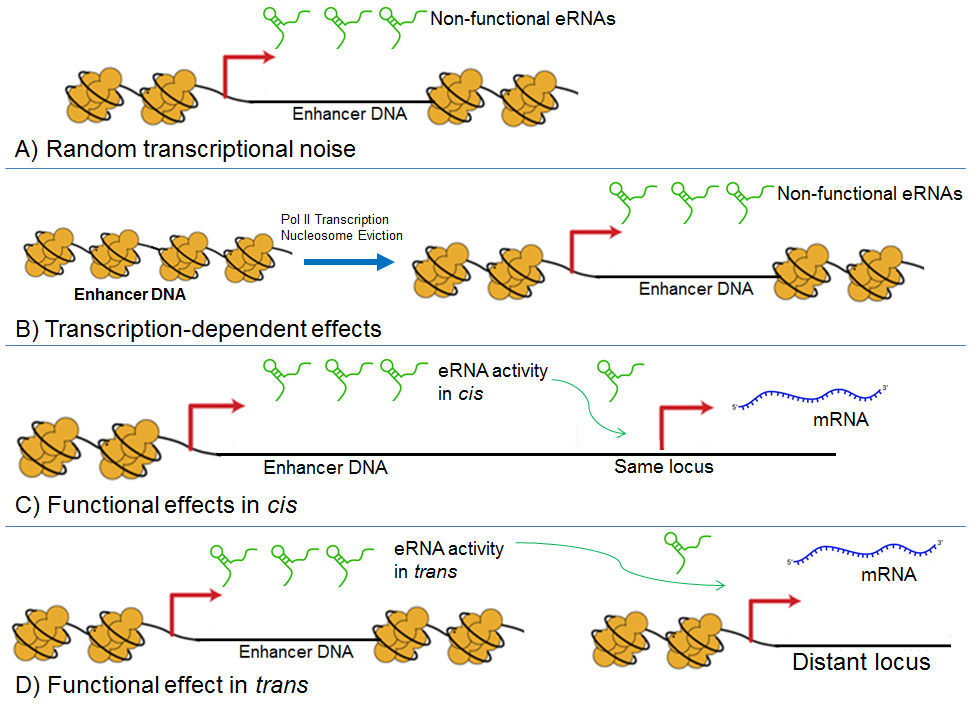
Proposed Mechanisms of eRNA Function

The notions that not all enhancers are transcribed at the same time and that eRNA transcription correlates with enhancer-specific activity support the idea that individual eRNAs carry distinct and relevant biological functions. However, there is still no consensus on the functional significance of eRNAs. Furthermore, eRNAs can easily be degraded through exosomes and nonsense-mediated decay, which limits their potential as important transcriptional regulators. To date, four main models of eRNA function have been proposed, each supported by different lines of experimental evidence.

=== Transcriptional Noise ===
Since multiple studies have shown that RNA Pol II can be found at a very large number of extragenic regions, it is possible that eRNAs simply represent the product of random "leaky" transcription and carry no functional significance. The non-specific activity of RNA Pol II would therefore allow extragenic transcriptional noise at sites where chromatin is already in an open and transcriptionally competent state. This would explain even tissue-specific eRNA expression as open sites are tissue-specific as well.

=== Transcription-dependent effects ===
RNA Pol II-mediated gene transcription induces a local opening of chromatin state through the recruitment of histone acetyltransferases and other histone modifiers that promote euchromatin formation. It was proposed that the presence of these enzymes could also induce an opening of chromatin at enhancer regions, which are usually present at distant locations but can be recruited to target genes through looping of DNA. In this model, eRNAs are therefore expressed in response to RNA Pol II transcription and therefore carry no biological function.

=== Functional activity in cis ===
While the two previous models implied that eRNAs were not functionally relevant, this mechanism states that eRNAs are functional molecules that exhibit cis activity. In this model, eRNAs can locally recruit regulatory proteins at their own site of synthesis. Supporting this hypothesis, transcripts originating from enhancers upstream of the Cyclin D1 gene are thought to serve as adaptors for the recruitment of histone acetyltransferases. It was found that depletion of these eRNAs led to Cyclin D1 transcriptional silencing.

=== Functional activity in trans ===
The last model involves transcriptional regulation by eRNAs at distant chromosomal locations. Through the differential recruitment of protein complexes, eRNAs can affect the transcriptional competency of specific loci. Evf-2 represents a good example of such trans regulatory eRNA as it can induce the expression of Dlx2, which in turn can increase the activity of the Dlx5 and Dlx6 enhancers. Trans-acting eRNAs might also be working in cis, and vice versa.

== Experimental detection ==
The detection of eRNAs is fairly recent (2010) and has been made possible through the use of genome-wide investigation techniques such as RNA sequencing (RNA-seq) and chromatin immunoprecipitation-sequencing (ChIP-seq). RNA-seq permits the direct identification of eRNAs by matching the detected transcript to the corresponding enhancer sequence through bioinformatic analyses. ChIP-seq represents a less direct way to assess enhancer transcription but can also provide crucial information as specific chromatin marks are associated with active enhancers. Although some data remain controversial, the consensus in the literature is that the best combination of histone post-translational modifications at active enhancers is made of H2AZ, H3K27ac, and a high ratio of H3K4me1 over H3K4me3. ChIP experiments can also be conducted with antibodies that recognize RNA Pol II, which can be found at sites of active transcription. The experimental detection of eRNAs is complicated by their low endogenous stability conferred by exosome degradation and nonsense-mediated decay. A comparative study showed that assays enriching for capped and nascent RNAs (with strategies like nuclei run-on and size selection) could capture more eRNAs compared to canonical RNA-seq. These assays include Global/Precision Run-on with cap-selection (GRO/PRO-cap), capped-small RNA-seq (csRNA-seq), Native Elongating Transcript-Cap Analysis of Gene Expression (NET-CAGE), and Precision Run-On sequencing (PRO-seq). Nonetheless, the fact that eRNAs tend to be expressed from active enhancers might make their detection a useful tool to distinguish between active and inactive enhancers.

== Implications in development and disease ==
Evidence that eRNAs cause downstream effects on the efficiency of enhancer activation and gene transcription suggests its functional capabilities and potential importance. The transcription factor p53 has been demonstrated to bind enhancer regions and generate eRNAs in a p53-dependent manner. In cancer, p53 plays a central role in tumor suppression as mutations of the gene are shown to appear in 50% of tumors. These p53-bound enhancer regions (p53BERs) are shown to interact with multiple local and distal gene targets involved in cell proliferation and survival. Furthermore, eRNAs generated by the activation of p53BERs are shown to be required for efficient transcription of the p53 target genes, indicating the likely important regulatory role of eRNAs in tumor suppression and cancer. Generally, mutations in eRNA have been shown to demonstrate similar phenotypic behavior in oncogenesis as compared to protein-coding RNA.

Variations in enhancers have been implicated in human disease but a therapeutic approach to manipulate enhancer activity is currently not available. With the emergence of eRNAs as important components in enhancer activity, powerful therapeutic tools such as RNAi may provide promising routes to target disruption of gene expression.
