= ZNF350 =

Protein-coding gene in the species Homo sapiens

Identifiers
- Aliases: ZNF350, ZBRK1, ZFQR, zinc finger protein 350
- External IDs: OMIM: 605422; GeneCards: ZNF350

Gene location (Human)
Chr.	Chromosome 19 (human)
Band	19q13.41	Start	51,964,340 bp
Band	19q13.41	End	51,986,856 bp
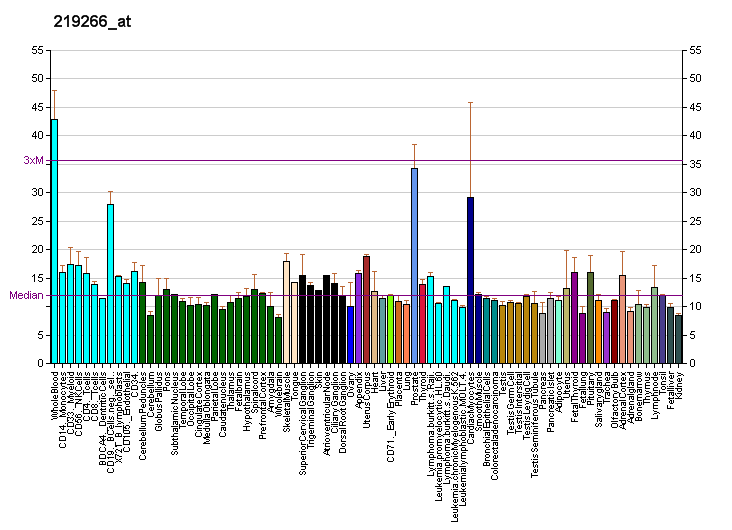
RNA expression pattern
Bgee	Human / Mouse (ortholog); Top expressed in: Achilles tendon; monocyte; amniotic fluid; prostate; gonad; bone marrow; sperm; germinal epithelium; rectum; granulocyte / n/a; More reference expression data
BioGPS	More reference expression data
Gene ontology
Molecular function	nucleic acid binding; DNA binding; protein binding; DNA-binding transcription repressor activity, RNA polymerase II-specific; metal ion binding; RNA polymerase II intronic transcription regulatory region sequence-specific DNA binding; DNA-binding transcription factor activity, RNA polymerase II-specific; DNA-binding transcription factor activity
Cellular component	nuclear matrix; transcription repressor complex; intracellular anatomical structure; nucleus; nucleoplasm; nuclear body
Biological process	negative regulation of transcription, DNA-templated; regulation of transcription, DNA-templated; negative regulation of transcription by RNA polymerase II; transcription, DNA-templated; positive regulation of transcription by RNA polymerase II
Sources:Amigo / QuickGO
Orthologs
Databases	NCBI: entry; OMA: entry
Species	Human	Mouse
Entrez	59348	n/a
Ensembl	ENSG00000256683	n/a
UniProt	Q9GZX5	n/a
RefSeq (mRNA)	NM_021632	n/a
RefSeq (protein)	NP_067645	n/a
Location (UCSC)	Chr 19: 51.96 – 51.99 Mb	n/a
PubMed search		n/a
- Wikidata
View/Edit Human

Zinc finger protein 350 is a protein that in humans is encoded by the ZNF350 gene.

== Interactions ==
ZNF350 has been shown to interact with BRCA1.

== See also ==
- Zinc finger
