= Negative elongation factor E =

Protein found in humans

NELFE
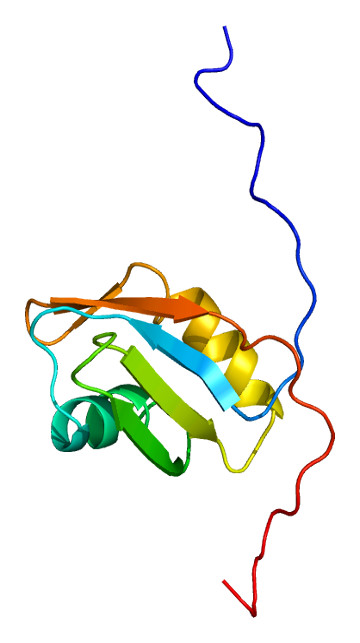

Identifiers
- Aliases: NELFE, D6S45, NELF-E, RD, RDBP, RDP, negative elongation factor complex member E
- External IDs: OMIM: 154040; MGI: 102744; GeneCards: NELFE
Available structures
PDB	Ortholog search: PDBe RCSB
PDB	List of PDB id codes 1X5P, 2BZ2, 2JX2

Gene location (Human)
Chr.	Chromosome 6 (human)
Band	6p21.33	Start	31,952,087 bp
Band	6p21.33	End	31,959,038 bp

Gene location (Mouse)
Chr.	Chromosome 17 (mouse)
Band	17 B1|17 18.4 cM	Start	35,069,367 bp
Band	17 B1|17 18.4 cM	End	35,075,348 bp
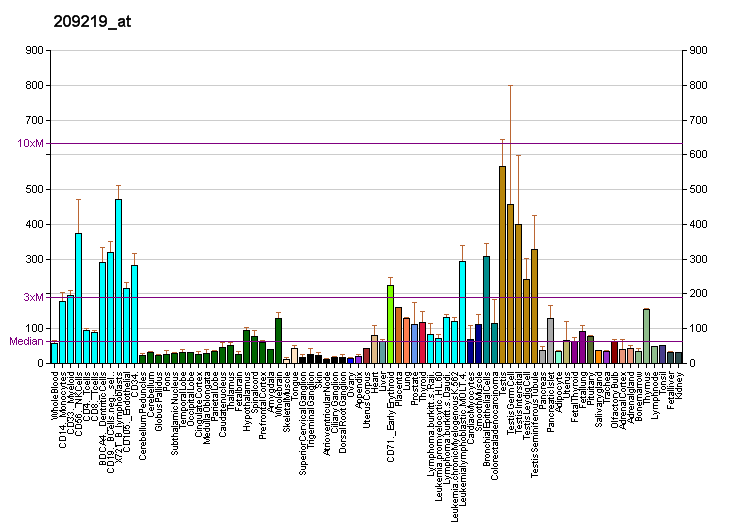
RNA expression pattern
Bgee	Human / Mouse (ortholog); Top expressed in: left testis; right testis; right uterine tube; olfactory zone of nasal mucosa; pituitary gland; anterior pituitary; C1 segment; left adrenal cortex; ventricular zone; right adrenal gland / Top expressed in: seminiferous tubule; internal carotid artery; spermatid; external carotid artery; spermatocyte; ventricular zone; hair follicle; maxillary prominence; mandibular prominence; epiblast; More reference expression data
BioGPS	More reference expression data
Gene ontology
Molecular function	nucleic acid binding; protein binding; chromatin binding; RNA binding
Cellular component	nucleus; nucleoplasm; NELF complex; plasma membrane; nuclear body
Biological process	negative regulation of transcription elongation from RNA polymerase II promoter; positive regulation of ERK1 and ERK2 cascade; positive regulation of viral transcription; transcription by RNA polymerase II; regulation of transcription, DNA-templated; positive regulation of transcription by RNA polymerase II; positive regulation of histone H3-K4 methylation; negative regulation of transcription by RNA polymerase II; negative regulation of mRNA polyadenylation; transcription elongation from RNA polymerase II promoter; transcription, DNA-templated
Sources:Amigo / QuickGO
Orthologs
Databases	NCBI: entry; OMA: entry
Species	Human	Mouse
Entrez	7936	27632
Ensembl	ENSG00000229363; ENSG00000206357; ENSG00000231044; ENSG00000204356; ENSG00000206268 ENSG00000233801	ENSMUSG00000024369
UniProt	P18615	P19426
RefSeq (mRNA)	NM_002904	NM_001045863; NM_001045864; NM_138580
RefSeq (protein)	NP_002895	NP_001039328; NP_001039329; NP_613046
Location (UCSC)	Chr 6: 31.95 – 31.96 Mb	Chr 17: 35.07 – 35.08 Mb
PubMed search
- Wikidata
View/Edit Human	View/Edit Mouse

Negative elongation factor E (or NELF-E) is a protein that in humans is encoded by the NELFE gene (previously RDBP).

== Function ==
The protein encoded by this gene is part of a complex termed negative elongation factor (NELF) which represses RNA polymerase II transcript elongation. This protein bears similarity to nuclear RNA-binding proteins; however, it has not been demonstrated that this protein binds RNA. The protein contains a tract of alternating basic and acidic residues, largely arginine (R) and aspartic acid (D). The gene localizes to the major histocompatibility complex (MHC class III) region on chromosome 6.

== Interactions ==
NELF-E has been shown to interact with:

- NELF-A,
- NELF-B, and
- NELF-C/D.
