= Negative elongation factor =

Protein

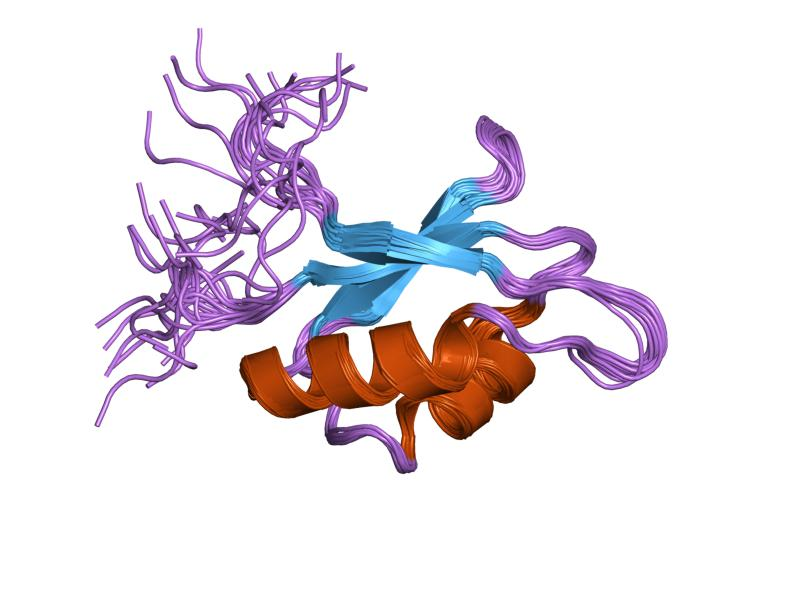
Protein structure of the E subunit of the negative elongation factor (NELF-E).

In molecular biology, the NELF (negative elongation factor) is a four-subunit protein complex (NELF-A, NELF-B, NELF-C/NELF-D, and NELF-E) that negatively impacts transcription by RNA polymerase II (Pol II) by pausing about 20–60 nucleotides downstream from the transcription start site (TSS).

== Structure ==
The NELF has four subunits within its complex which are the following: NELF-A, NELF-B, NELF-C/NELF-D, and NELF-E. The NELF-A subunit is encoded by the gene NELFA. Micro-sequencing analysis demonstrated that NELF-B was the protein previously identified as being encoded by the gene COBRA1 (now NELFB). It is unknown whether or not NELF-C and NELF-D are peptides resulting from the same mRNA with different translation initiation sites; possibly differing only in an extra 9 amino acids for NELF-C at the N-terminus, or peptides from different mRNAs entirely. A single NELF complex consists of either NELF-C or NELF-D, but not both. NELF-E is encoded by the gene NELFE which has also known as RDBP.

== Function and Interactions ==
NELF is located in the nucleus. NELF binds in a stable complex with DSIF (5,6-dichloro-1-β-d-ribofuranosylbenzimidazole (DRB)-sensitivity inducing factor) and RNA polymerase II together, but not with either alone. Due to its role in transcription, NELF is also a key player in the negative function of DSIF. NELF also works with DSIF to inhibit the speed of Pol II during the elongation phase in transcription. In D. melanogaster, the HSP70 gene is affected by NELF and DSIF through the induction of promoter proximal pausing. It is thought that NELF arose to assist DSIF by amplifying its negative effects in order to increase gene expression control. P-TEFb (positive transcription elongation factor b) inhibits the effect of NELF and DSIF on Pol II elongation, via its phosphorylation of serine-2 of the C-terminal domain of Pol II, and the SPT5 subunit of DSIF, causing dissociation of NELF.

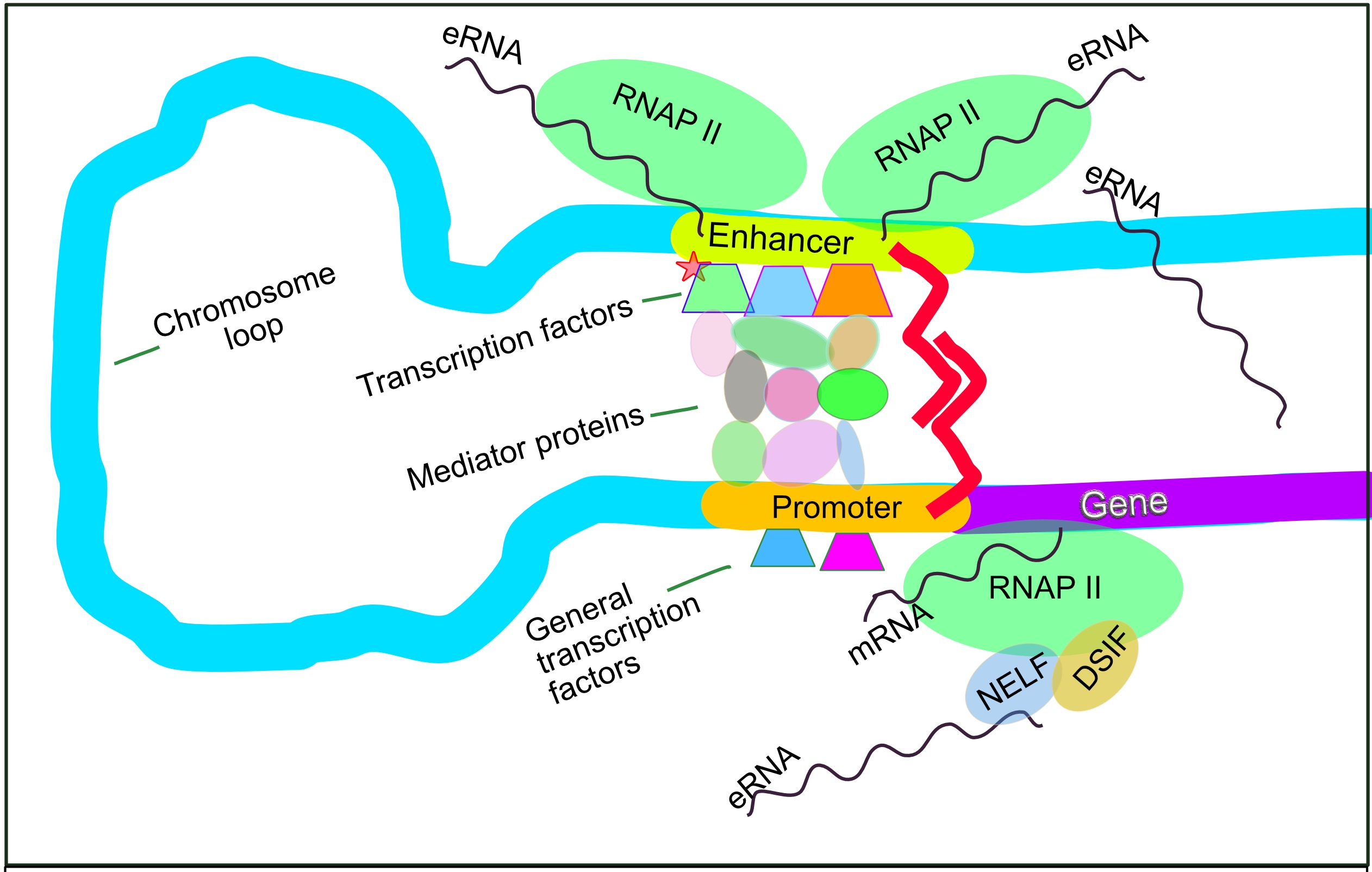
Regulatory elements, including Negative elongation factor (NELF) and enhancer RNA (eRNA) control transcription of a gene into messenger RNA in metazoans (animals). An active enhancer regulatory region of DNA is enabled to interact with the promoter DNA region of its target gene by the formation of a chromosome loop. This can initiate messenger RNA (mRNA) synthesis by RNA polymerase II (RNAP II) bound to the promoter at the transcription start site of the gene. The loop is stabilized by one architectural protein anchored to the enhancer and one anchored to the promoter and these proteins are joined to form a dimer (red zigzags). Specific regulatory transcription factors bind to DNA sequence motifs on the enhancer. General transcription factors bind to the promoter. When a transcription factor is activated by a signal (here indicated as phosphorylation shown by a small red star on a transcription factor on the enhancer) the enhancer is activated and can now activate its target promoter. The active enhancer is transcribed on each strand of DNA in opposite directions by bound RNAP IIs. Mediator (a complex consisting of about 26 proteins in an interacting structure) communicates regulatory signals from the enhancer DNA-bound transcription factors to the promoter. NELF, in complex with DSIF and RNAP II, can pause transcription. Interaction of eRNA with NELF may release NELF and allow productive elongation of mRNA.

Another mechanism, interaction of enhancer RNA with NELF, causes dissociation of NELF from RNA polymerase II, resulting in productive elongation of mRNA, as studied in two immediate early genes.

However, many mechanisms by which NELF and DSIF operate remain unclear. NELF homologues exist in some metazoans (e.g. insects and vertebrates) but have not been found in plants, yeast, or nematodes (worms).

Interactions by subunit:

- NELF-A: Pol II complex.
- NELF-B: KIAA1191, NELF-E, and an early sequence of BRCA1.
- NELF-C/D: ARAF1, PCF11, and KAT8.
- NELF-E: NELF-B and HIV TAR RNA.
- NELF undergoes Phase separation in vitro and Condensation in vivo

== Clinical Significance ==
The NELF complex is also possibly a player in the enlistment of gene PCF11 to the stopped Pol II in HIV-1 latency. It was previously thought that NELF-A may play a role in the phenotype of Wolf-Hirschhorn syndrome (WHS) as it is mapped to the critical area of deletion on the short arm of chromosome 4, however later research has indicated that this is not the case. Pol II pausing controlled by NELF is a key source of R-loop aggregation in mammary epithelial cells that are BRCA1-deficient, which could ultimately lead to tumorigenesis.
