= CDC42 effector protein 5 =

Protein-coding gene in humans

CDC42EP5

Identifiers
- Aliases: CDC42EP5, Borg3, CEP5, CDC42 effector protein 5
- External IDs: OMIM: 609171; MGI: 1929745; GeneCards: CDC42EP5

Gene location (Human)
Chr.	Chromosome 19 (human)
Band	19q13.42	Start	54,465,026 bp
Band	19q13.42	End	54,473,296 bp

Gene location (Mouse)
Chr.	Chromosome 7 (mouse)
Band	7|7 A1	Start	4,154,259 bp
Band	7|7 A1	End	4,167,859 bp
RNA expression pattern
Bgee	Human / Mouse (ortholog); Top expressed in: mucosa of transverse colon; duodenum; olfactory zone of nasal mucosa; prostate; rectum; ascending aorta; tibial nerve; Descending thoracic aorta; canal of the cervix; Achilles tendon / Top expressed in: intestinal villus; duodenum; transitional epithelium of urinary bladder; epithelium of stomach; mucous cell of stomach; large intestine; pyloric antrum; colon; crypt of lieberkuhn of small intestine; left colon; More reference expression data
BioGPS	n/a
Gene ontology
Molecular function	GTPase activator activity
Cellular component	cytosol; cytoskeleton; endomembrane system; membrane; plasma membrane; cytoplasm
Biological process	JNK cascade; positive regulation of pseudopodium assembly; positive regulation of actin filament polymerization; regulation of cell shape; positive regulation of GTPase activity; Rho protein signal transduction
Sources:Amigo / QuickGO
Orthologs
Databases	NCBI: entry; OMA: entry
Species	Human	Mouse
Entrez	148170	58804
Ensembl	ENSG00000167617	ENSMUSG00000063838
UniProt	Q6NZY7	Q9Z0X0
RefSeq (mRNA)	NM_145057	NM_021454
RefSeq (protein)	NP_659494	NP_067429
Location (UCSC)	Chr 19: 54.47 – 54.47 Mb	Chr 7: 4.15 – 4.17 Mb
PubMed search
- Wikidata
View/Edit Human	View/Edit Mouse

CDC42 effector protein 5 is a protein that in humans is encoded by the CDC42EP5 gene.

== Function ==
Cell division control protein 42 (CDC42), a small Rho GTPase, regulates the formation of F-actin-containing structures through its interaction with the downstream effector proteins. The protein encoded by this gene is a member of the Borg (binder of Rho GTPases) family of CDC42 effector proteins. Borg family proteins contain a CRIB (Cdc42/Rac interactive-binding) domain. They bind to CDC42 and regulate its function negatively. The encoded protein may inhibit c-Jun N-terminal kinase (JNK) independently of CDC42 binding. The protein may also play a role in septin organization and inducing pseudopodia formation in fibroblasts [provided by RefSeq, Jul 2013].
