= Mir-30 microRNA precursor =

Precursor microRNA family

mir-30 microRNA precursor
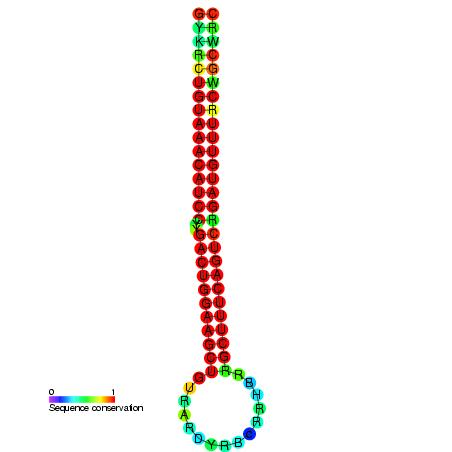
- Predicted secondary structure and sequence conservation of mir-30

Identifiers
- Symbol: mir-30
- Rfam: RF00131
- miRBase: MI0000088
- miRBase family: MIPF0000005

Other data
- RNA type: Gene; miRNA
- Domain: Eukaryota
- GO: GO:0035068 GO:0035195
- SO: SO:0001244
- PDB structures: PDBe

miR-30 microRNA precursor is a small non-coding RNA that regulates gene expression. Animal microRNAs are transcribed as pri-miRNA (primary miRNA) of varying length which in turn are processed in the nucleus by Drosha into ~70 nucleotide stem-loop precursor called pre-miRNA (precursor miRNA) and subsequently processed by the Dicer enzyme to give a mature ~22 nucleotide product. In this case the mature sequence comes from both the 3' (miR-30) and 5' (mir-97-6) arms of the precursor. The products are thought to have regulatory roles through complementarity to mRNA.

A screen of 17 miRNAs that have been predicted to regulate a number of breast cancer associated genes found variations in the microRNAs miR-17 and miR-30c-1, these patients were noncarriers of BRCA1 or BRCA2 mutations, lending the possibility that familial breast cancer may be caused by variation in these miRNAs.

Members of the miR-30 family have been found to be highly expressed in heart cells.

== Targets of miR-30 ==
It has been shown that the integrin ITGB3 and the ubiquitin conjugating E2 enzyme UBC9 are downregulated by miR-30. It has also been suggested that the TP53 protein may be a target of miR-30c and miR-30e. An immunoblot analysis revealed that p53 expression levels were elevated upon knockdown of miR-30c and miR-30e.
