= SUPT4H1 =

Protein-coding gene in the species Homo sapiens

Available structures
| PDB | Ortholog search: PDBe RCSB |
| PDB | List of PDB id codes 3H7H |

Identifiers
- Aliases: SUPT4H1, SPT4, SPT4H, SUPT4H, Supt4a, SPT4 homolog, DSIF elongation factor subunit
- External IDs: OMIM: 603555; MGI: 107416; HomoloGene: 68303; GeneCards: SUPT4H1; OMA:SUPT4H1 - orthologs

Gene location (Mouse)
| Chr. | Chromosome 11 (mouse) |
| Band | 11 C|11 52.2 cM | Start | 87,628,378 bp |
| Band | 11 C|11 52.2 cM | End | 87,634,449 bp |
RNA expression pattern
| Bgee | Human / Mouse (ortholog); Top expressed in: monocyte; blood; Achilles tendon; bone marrow; stromal cell of endometrium; lymph node; islet of Langerhans; ganglionic eminence; bone marrow cell; right adrenal gland / Top expressed in: granulocyte; morula; embryo; embryo; yolk sac; ventricular zone; right kidney; neural layer of retina; lip; dentate gyrus of hippocampal formation granule cell; More reference expression data |
| BioGPS | n/a |
Gene ontology
| Molecular function | DNA-binding transcription factor activity; zinc ion binding; metal ion binding; protein binding; protein heterodimerization activity; RNA polymerase II complex binding; single-stranded RNA binding |
| Cellular component | nucleoplasm; DSIF complex; nucleus |
| Biological process | chromatin remodeling; regulation of transcription, DNA-templated; regulation of transcription by RNA polymerase II; transcription elongation from RNA polymerase II promoter; negative regulation of transcription by RNA polymerase II; transcription by RNA polymerase II; negative regulation of transcription elongation from RNA polymerase II promoter; transcription, DNA-templated; negative regulation of DNA-templated transcription, elongation; positive regulation of DNA-templated transcription, elongation; positive regulation of transcription by RNA polymerase II; mRNA processing; regulation of transcription elongation from RNA polymerase II promoter; chromatin organization; positive regulation of viral transcription |
Sources:Amigo / QuickGO
Orthologs
| Species | Human | Mouse |
| Entrez | 6827 | 20922 |
| Ensembl | n/a | ENSMUSG00000020485 |
| UniProt | P63272 | P63271 |
| RefSeq (mRNA) | NM_003168 | NM_009296; NM_001355753 |
| RefSeq (protein) | NP_003159 | NP_033322; NP_001342682 |
| Location (UCSC) | n/a | Chr 11: 87.63 – 87.63 Mb |
| PubMed search |
- Wikidata
| View/Edit Human | View/Edit Mouse |

Transcription elongation factor SPT4 is a protein that in humans is encoded by the SUPT4H1 gene. Together with hSPT5, it composes DSIF in humans.
