= SUPT5H =

Protein-coding gene in the species Homo sapiens

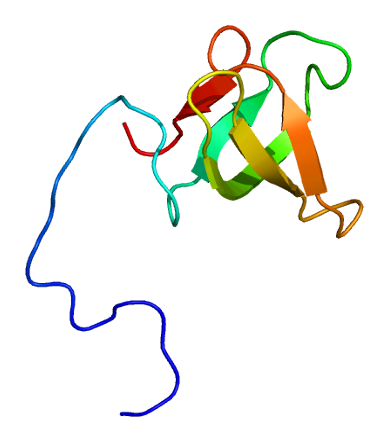
Available structures
PDB	Ortholog search: PDBe RCSB
PDB	List of PDB id codes 2DO3, 2E6Z, 2E70, 3H7H, 4L1U

Identifiers
- Aliases: SUPT5H, SPT5, SPT5H, Tat-CT1, SPT5 homolog, DSIF elongation factor subunit
- External IDs: OMIM: 602102; MGI: 1202400; HomoloGene: 2384; GeneCards: SUPT5H; OMA:SUPT5H - orthologs

Gene location (Human)
Chr.	Chromosome 19 (human)
Band	19q13.2	Start	39,436,156 bp
Band	19q13.2	End	39,476,670 bp

Gene location (Mouse)
Chr.	Chromosome 7 (mouse)
Band	7 A3|7 16.68 cM	Start	28,014,316 bp
Band	7 A3|7 16.68 cM	End	28,038,171 bp
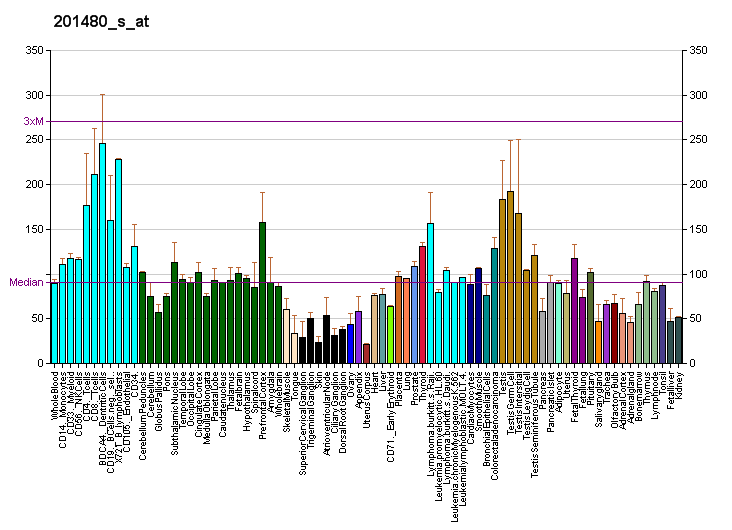
RNA expression pattern
Bgee	Human / Mouse (ortholog); Top expressed in: right testis; left testis; anterior pituitary; sural nerve; right hemisphere of cerebellum; right lobe of thyroid gland; right uterine tube; left lobe of thyroid gland; apex of heart; right frontal lobe / Top expressed in: adrenal gland; Gonadal ridge; internal carotid artery; external carotid artery; fossa; crypt of lieberkuhn of small intestine; lacrimal gland; tail of embryo; vestibular membrane of cochlear duct; motor neuron; More reference expression data
BioGPS	More reference expression data
Gene ontology
Molecular function	protein binding; protein heterodimerization activity; enzyme binding; chromatin binding; RNA binding; DNA binding; mRNA binding
Cellular component	nucleoplasm; DSIF complex; nucleus
Biological process	chromatin remodeling; negative regulation of mRNA polyadenylation; regulation of transcription, DNA-templated; regulation of transcription by RNA polymerase II; transcription elongation from RNA polymerase II promoter; regulation of DNA-templated transcription, elongation; negative regulation of transcription by RNA polymerase II; 7-methylguanosine mRNA capping; transcription by RNA polymerase II; response to organic substance; transcription, DNA-templated; negative regulation of DNA-templated transcription, elongation; positive regulation of DNA-templated transcription, elongation; positive regulation of macroautophagy; DNA-templated transcription, elongation; single stranded viral RNA replication via double stranded DNA intermediate; positive regulation of viral transcription; cell cycle; positive regulation of transcription by RNA polymerase II
Sources:Amigo / QuickGO
Orthologs
Species	Human	Mouse
Entrez	6829	20924
Ensembl	ENSG00000196235	ENSMUSG00000003435
UniProt	O00267	O55201
RefSeq (mRNA)	NM_001111020; NM_001130824; NM_001130825; NM_003169; NM_001319990 NM_001319991	NM_013676
RefSeq (protein)	NP_001104490; NP_001124296; NP_001124297; NP_001306919; NP_001306920 NP_003160	NP_038704
Location (UCSC)	Chr 19: 39.44 – 39.48 Mb	Chr 7: 28.01 – 28.04 Mb
PubMed search
- Wikidata
View/Edit Human	View/Edit Mouse

Transcription elongation factor SPT5 is a protein that in humans is encoded by the SUPT5H gene. Together with hSPT4, it composes DSIF in humans.

== Interactions ==
SUPT5H has been shown to interact with:

- CDK9,
- Cyclin-dependent kinase 7,
- HTATSF1,
- PIN1,
- POLR2A,
- PRMT1 and
- Protein arginine methyltransferase 5.
