= DSIF =

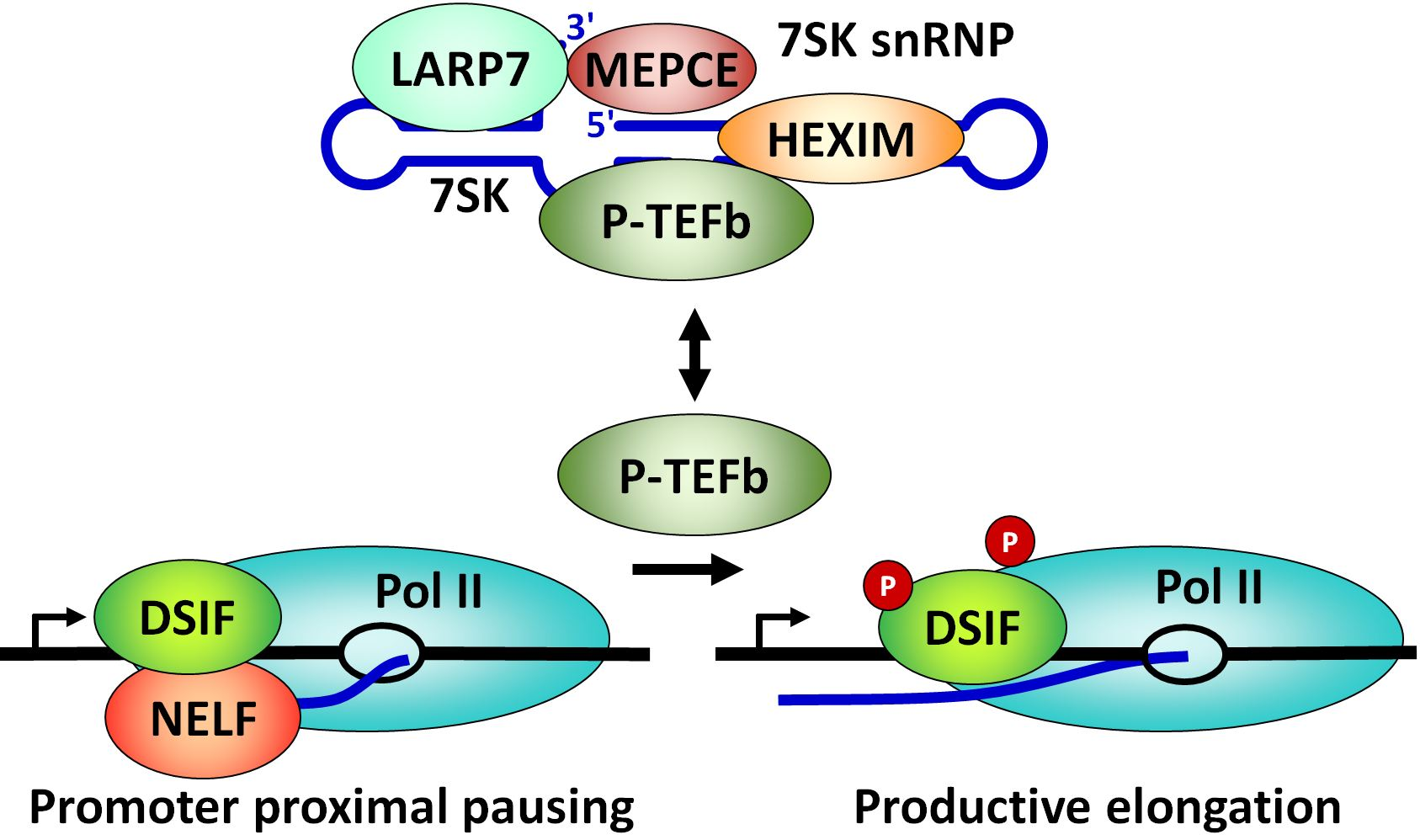
Together DSIF and NELF can stall transcription right after initiation by stopping Pol II elongation. P-TEFb can phosphorylate DSIF, NELF, and Pol II to resume transcription. Once phosphorylated NELF falls away while DSIF stimulates elongation.

DSIF (DRB Sensitivity Inducing Factor) is a protein complex that can either negatively or positively affect transcription by RNA polymerase II (Pol II). It can interact with the negative elongation factor (NELF) to promote the stalling of Pol II at some genes, which is called promoter proximal pausing. The pause occurs soon after initiation, once 20–60 nucleotides have been transcribed. This stalling is relieved by positive transcription elongation factor b (P-TEFb) and Pol II enters productive elongation to resume synthesis till finish. In humans, DSIF is composed of hSPT4 and hSPT5. hSPT5 has a direct role in mRNA capping which occurs while the elongation is paused.

SPT5 is preserved in humans to bacteria. SPT4 and SPT5 in yeast are the homologs of hSPT4 and hSPT5. In bacteria, the homologous complex only contains NusG, a Spt5 homolog. Archaea have both proteins.

The complex locks the RNA polymerase (RNAP) clamp into a closed state to prevent the elongation complex (EC) from dissociating. The Spt5 NGN domain helps anneal the two strands of DNA upstream. The single KOW domain in bacteria and archaea anchors a ribosome to the RNAP.

== Role in Diseases ==
=== HIV ===
DSIF plays the same role for HIV-1 gene expression as it would normally in transcription. This is because P-TEFb phosphorylates DSIF the same regardless of whether or not P-TEFb goes through normal cellular regulation or bypasses it due to Tat.
