= Negative elongation factor C/D =

Protein found in humans

NELFCD

Identifiers
- Aliases: NELFCD, NELF-C, NELF-D, TH1, TH1L, HSPC130, negative elongation factor complex member C/D
- External IDs: OMIM: 605297; MGI: 1926424; GeneCards: NELFCD
Available structures
| PDB | Ortholog search: PDBe RCSB |
| PDB | List of PDB id codes 5L3X |

Gene location (Human)
| Chr. | Chromosome 20 (human) |
| Band | 20q13.32 | Start | 58,981,208 bp |
| Band | 20q13.32 | End | 58,995,133 bp |

Gene location (Mouse)
| Chr. | Chromosome 2 (mouse) |
| Band | 2|2 H4 | Start | 174,257,597 bp |
| Band | 2|2 H4 | End | 174,269,295 bp |
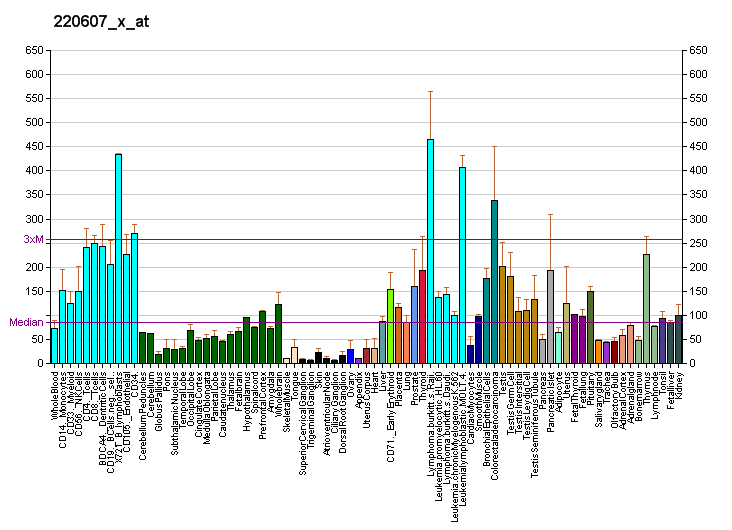
RNA expression pattern
| Bgee | Human / Mouse (ortholog); Top expressed in: anterior pituitary; ventricular zone; ganglionic eminence; right lobe of thyroid gland; left lobe of thyroid gland; left ovary; right hemisphere of cerebellum; right ovary; islet of Langerhans; right uterine tube / Top expressed in: yolk sac; ventricular zone; otic vesicle; superior cervical ganglion; neural layer of retina; genital tubercle; epiblast; otic placode; saccule; tail of embryo; More reference expression data |
| BioGPS | More reference expression data |
Gene ontology
| Molecular function | protein binding; RNA binding |
| Cellular component | membrane; NELF complex; nucleus; nucleoplasm |
| Biological process | transcription elongation from RNA polymerase II promoter; positive regulation of viral transcription; negative regulation of transcription, DNA-templated; regulation of transcription, DNA-templated; transcription by RNA polymerase II; transcription, DNA-templated; negative regulation of transcription elongation from RNA polymerase II promoter |
Sources:Amigo / QuickGO
Orthologs
| Databases | NCBI: entry; OMA: entry |
| Species | Human | Mouse |
| Entrez | 51497 | 57314 |
| Ensembl | ENSG00000101158 | ENSMUSG00000016253 |
| UniProt | Q8IXH7 | Q922L6 |
| RefSeq (mRNA) | NM_016397; NM_198976 | NM_020580 |
| RefSeq (protein) | NP_945327 | NP_065605 |
| Location (UCSC) | Chr 20: 58.98 – 59 Mb | Chr 2: 174.26 – 174.27 Mb |
| PubMed search |
- Wikidata
| View/Edit Human | View/Edit Mouse |

Negative elongation factor C/D (or NELF-C/D) is a protein that in humans is encoded by the NELFCD gene (previously TH1L). NELFCD encodes three known isoforms, the (UniProt) canonical transcript is sometimes called NELF-C, while one of the alternative transcripts is called NELF-D. This protein is part of the negative elongation factor (NELF) complex, which is involved in repressing transcriptional elongation.

== Function ==
The NELF complex of proteins interacts with the DSIF protein complex to repress transcriptional elongation by RNA polymerase II. The protein encoded by this gene is an essential part of the NELF complex. Alternative translation initiation site usage results in the formation of two isoforms with different N-termini.

== Interactions ==
NELF-C/D has been shown to interact with:

- ARAF,
- NELF-B, and
- NELF-E.
