= Chromosome 12 =

Human chromosome

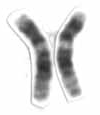
- Human chromosome 12 pair after G-banding. One is from mother, one is from father.

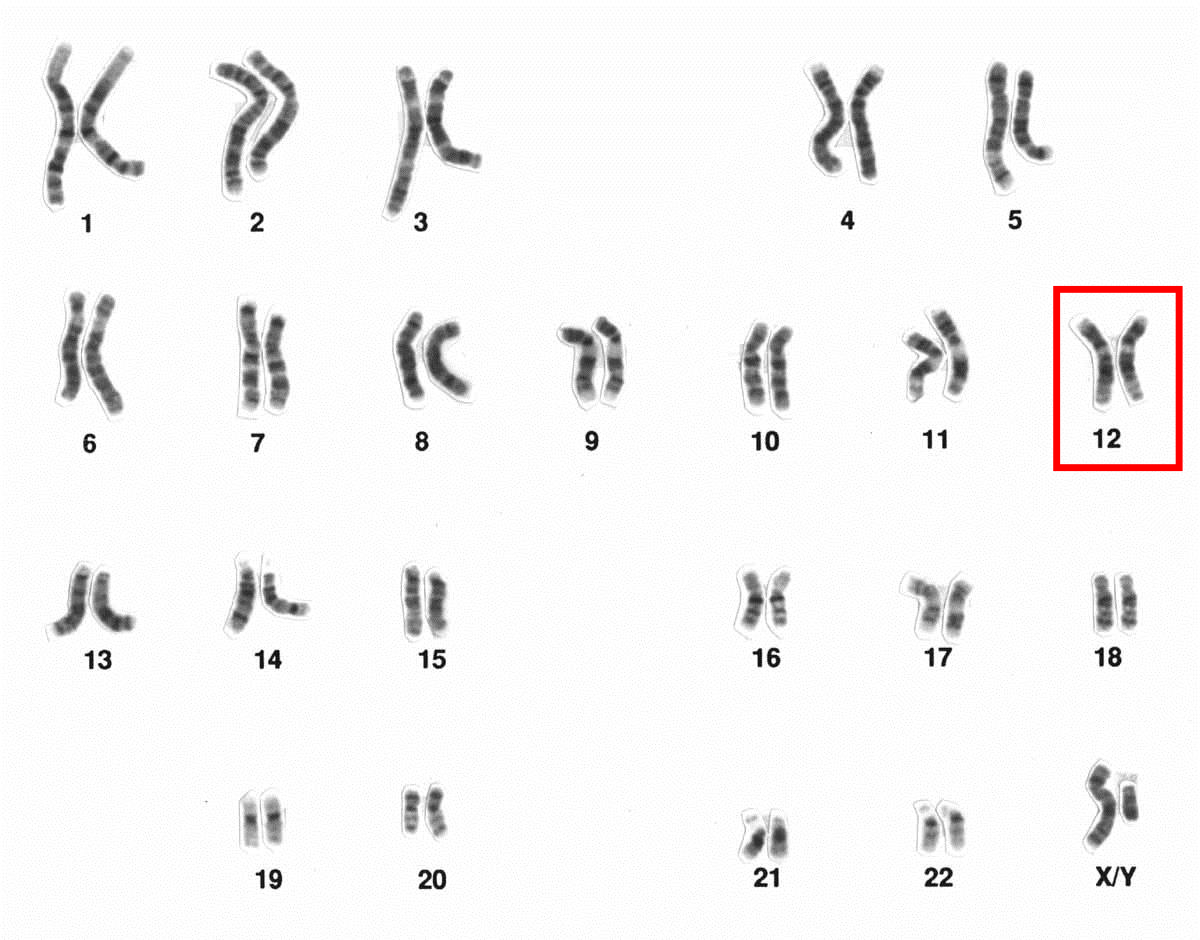
- Chromosome 12 pair in human male karyogram.

Features
- Length (bp): 133,324,548 bp (CHM13)
- No. of genes: 988 (CCDS)
- Type: Autosome
- Centromere position: Submetacentric (35.5 Mbp)

Complete gene lists
- CCDS: Gene list
- HGNC: Gene list
- UniProt: Gene list
- NCBI: Gene list

External map viewers
- Ensembl: Chromosome 12
- Entrez: Chromosome 12
- NCBI: Chromosome 12
- UCSC: Chromosome 12

Full DNA sequences
- RefSeq: NC_000012 (FASTA)
- GenBank: CM000674 (FASTA)

Chromosome 12 is one of the 23 pairs of chromosomes in humans. People normally have two copies of this chromosome. Chromosome 12 spans about 133 million base pairs (the building material of DNA) and represents between 4 and 4.5 percent of the total DNA in cells.

Chromosome 12 contains the Homeobox C gene cluster.

== Genes ==
=== Number of genes ===
The following are some of the gene count estimates of human chromosome 12. Because researchers use different approaches to genome annotation their predictions of the number of genes on each chromosome varies (for technical details, see gene prediction). Among various projects, the collaborative consensus coding sequence project (CCDS) takes an extremely conservative strategy. So CCDS's gene number prediction represents a lower bound on the total number of human protein-coding genes.

Estimated by	Protein-coding genes	Non-coding RNA genes	Pseudogenes	Source	Release date
CCDS	988	—	—		2016-09-08
HGNC	995	318	545		2017-05-12
Ensembl	1,033	1,202	617		2017-03-29
UniProt	1,032	—	—		2018-02-28
NCBI	1,036	853	693		2017-05-19

=== Gene list ===
The following is a partial list of genes on human chromosome 12. For complete list, see the link in the infobox on the right.

- ACAD10: encoding protein Acyl-CoA dehydrogenase family, member 10
- ACRBP: encoding protein Acrosin binding protein
- ACSS3: encoding protein Acyl-CoA synthetase short-chain family member 3
- ACVRL1: activin A receptor type II-like 1f
- ANKRD33: encoding protein Ankyrin repeat domain 33
- APOF: encoding protein Apolipoprotein F
- APOLD1: apolipoprotein L domain containing 1
- ARL6IP4: encoding protein ADP-ribosylation-like factor 6 interacting protein 4
- ARPC3: encoding protein Actin-related protein 2/3 complex subunit 3
- Asun: encoding protein Protein asunder homolog (Asun)
- ATP2B1-AS1: encoding protein Atp2b1 antisense rna 1
- ATG101: Autophagy-related protein 101
- BCAT1: encoding protein Branched chain amino acid transaminase 1
- BIN2: encoding protein Bridging integrator 2
- BRAP: encoding protein BRCA1 associated protein
- C12orf24: encoding protein FAM216A
- C12orf29: encoding protein C12orf29
- C12orf42: encoding protein uncharacterised chromosome 12 open reading frame 42
- C12orf43: encoding protein. Uncharacterized.
- C12orf60: encoding protein Uncharacterized protein C12orf60
- CALCOCO1: Calcium-binding and coiled-coil domain-containing protein 1
- CBX5: chromobox homolog 5
- CCDC53: Coiled-coil domain-containing protein 53
- CKAP4: Cytoskeleton associated protein 4
- CNOT2: encoding protein CCR4-NOT transcription complex subunit 2
- CNPY2: encoding protein Canopy FGF signaling regulator 2
- CCDC42B: encoding protein Coiled Coil Domain Containing protein 42B
- COL2A1: collagen, type II, alpha 1 (primary osteoarthritis, spondyloepiphyseal dysplasia, congenital)
- CRACR2A: encoding protein Calcium release activated channel regulator 2A
- CSRP2: Cysteine and glycine-rich protein 2
- DDX23: DEAD-box helicase 23
- DDX47: DEAD-box helicase 47
- DHH: Desert hedgehog protein
- DNAI7: encoding protein Dynein axonemal intermediate chain 7
- DPPA3: Developmental pluripotency-associated protein 3
- DPY19L2: encoding protein Dpy-19-like 2 (C. elegans)
- DTX3: encoding protein Deltex e3 ubiquitin ligase 3
- E2F7: E2F transcription factor 7
- EMP1: Epithelial membrane protein 1
- ENDOU: encoding protein Endonuclease, poly(u) specific
- ERGIC2: encoding protein a protein of 377 amino acid residues
- FAM60A: encoding protein FAM60A
- FAM186B: encoding protein Protein FAM186B
- GABARAPL1: encoding protein Gaba type a receptor associated protein like 1
- GPD1: encoding protein Glycerol-3-phosphate dehydrogenase 1
- GOLT1B: Golgi transport 1B
- GPN3: encoding enzyme GPN-loop GTPase 3
- HNF1A-AS1: encoding protein HNF1A antisense RNA 1
- HPD: 4-hydroxyphenylpyruvate dioxygenase
- IFFO1: encoding protein Intermediate filament family orphan 1
- IFNG-AS1: encoding long non-coding RNA IFNG antisense RNA 1
- KANSL2: encoding protein KAT8 regulatory NSL complex subunit 2 (KANSL2)
- KCNA1: potassium voltage-gated channel subfamily A member 1 at 12p13.32
- KDM2B: encoding protein Lysine (K)-specific demethylase 2B
- KERA: keratocan
- KRAS: V-Ki-ras2 Kirsten rat sarcoma viral oncogene homolog
- LARP4: encoding protein La-related protein 4
- LEPREL2: encoding enzyme Prolyl 3-hydroxylase 3
- LINC00173: encoding protein Long intergenic non-protein coding rna 173* LMBR1L: encoding protein Protein LMBR1L
- LRRC23: encoding protein Leucine-rich repeat-containing protein 23
- LRRIQ1: encoding protein Leucine-rich repeats and IQ motif containing 1
- LRRK2: leucine-rich repeat kinase 2
- MBOAT5: encoding enzyme Lysophospholipid acyltransferase 5
- METTL1: encoding enzyme tRNA (guanine-N(7)-)-methyltransferase
- MFAP5: encoding protein Microfibrillar-associated protein 5
- MIR196A2: encoding microRNA MicroRNA 196a-2
- MIR200C: encoding MicroRNA 200c
- MMAB: methylmalonic aciduria (cobalamin deficiency) cblB type
- MON2: encoding protein Protein MON2 homolog
- MUCL1: encoding protein Mucin-like protein 1
- MYO1A: myosin IA
- NANOG: NK-2 type homeodomain gene
- NAP1L1: encoding protein Nucleosome assembly protein 1-like 1
- NLRP9P1: encoding protein NLR family pyrin domain containing 9 pseudogene 1
- NRIP2: encoding protein Nuclear receptor-interacting protein 2
- NUDT4: encoding enzyme Diphosphoinositol polyphosphate phosphohydrolase 2
- PAH: phenylalanine hydroxylase
- PIP4K2C: encoding protein Phosphatidylinositol-5-phosphate 4-kinase, type II, gamma
- PIWIL1: encoding protein Piwi-like protein 1
- PLBD1: encoding protein Phospholipase B domain containing 1 1
- POP5: encoding enzyme Ribonuclease P/MRP protein subunit POP5
- PPHLN1: encoding protein Periphilin-1
- PPP1R12A: protein phosphatase 1, regulatory (inhibitor) subunit 12A
- PRB1: encoding protein Basic salivary proline-rich protein 1
- PRB3: encoding protein Basic salivary proline-rich protein 3
- PRB4: encoding protein Basic salivary proline-rich protein 4
- PRH1: encoding protein Salivary acidic proline-rich phosphoprotein 1/2
- PRH2: encoding protein Proline-rich protein HaeIII subfamily 2
- PRMT8: encoding protein Protein arginine methyltransferase 8
- PRR4: encoding protein Proline-rich protein 4
- PTMS: encoding protein Parathymosin
- PTPN11: protein tyrosine phosphatase, non-receptor type 11 (Noonan syndrome 1)
- PUS1: encoding enzyme tRNA pseudouridine synthase A
- PUS7L: encoding enzyme Pseudouridylate synthase 7 homolog-like protein
- PZP: encoding protein Pregnancy zone protein
- RAB3IP: encoding protein RAB3A-interacting protein
- RASSF8: encoding protein Ras association domain-containing protein 8
- RASSF9: encoding protein Ras association domain-containing protein 9
- RERG: encoding protein RAS-like, estrogen-regulated, growth inhibitor
- RIMKLB: encoding protein Ribosomal modification protein rimk like family member b
- RNF34: encoding enzyme E3 ubiquitin-protein ligase RNF34
- RNU4-1: encoding protein RNA, U4 small nuclear 1
- SARNP: SAP domain-containing ribonucleoprotein
- Serpina3f: encoding protein Serine (or cysteine) peptidase inhibitor, clade A, member 3F
- SHMT2: encoding protein Serine hydroxymethyltransferase 2
- SLC8B1: solute carrier family 8 member B1
- TBC1D15: encoding protein TBC1 domain family member 15
- TBX3: encoding protein T-box transcription factor 3
- TCHP: encoding protein Trichoplein keratin filament-binding protein
- TESPA1: encoding protein Thymocyte expressed, positive selection associated 1
- THAP2: encoding protein THAP domain-containing protein 2
- TMTC1: encoding protein Transmembrane and tetratricopeptide repeat containing 1
- TMEM117: encoding protein Transmembrane protein 117
- TRAFD1: encoding protein TRAF-type zinc finger domain-containing protein 1
- TSFM: encoding protein Elongation factor Ts, mitochondrial
- TWF1: twinfilin-1
- UNQ1887:
- USP52: encoding enzyme PAB-dependent poly(A)-specific ribonuclease subunit 2
- UTP20: encoding protein Small subunit processome component 20 homolog
- VEZT: encoding protein Vezatin
- VPS37B: encoding protein Vps37b, escrt-i subunit
- YAF2: encoding protein YY1-associated factor 2
- ZCCHC8: encoding protein Zinc finger CCHC domain-containing protein 8
- ZFC3H1: encoding protein Zinc finger C3H1-type containing
- ZNF26: encoding protein Zinc finger protein 26
- ZNF84: encoding protein Zinc finger protein 84
- ZNF268: encoding protein Zinc finger protein 268
- ZNF664: encoding protein Zinc finger protein 664

== Diseases and disorders ==
The following diseases are some of those related to genes on chromosome 12:

- achondrogenesis type 2
- bipolar disorder
- collagenopathy, types II and XI
- cornea plana 2
- episodic ataxia
- hereditary hemorrhagic telangiectasia
- hypochondrogenesis
- ichthyosis bullosa of Siemens
- Kniest dysplasia
- Kabuki syndrome
- maturity onset diabetes of the young type 3
- methylmalonic acidemia
- narcolepsy
- nonsyndromic deafness
- Noonan syndrome
- Parkinson disease
- Pallister-Killian syndrome (tetrasomy 12p)
- phenylketonuria
- schizophrenia
- spondyloepimetaphyseal dysplasia, Strudwick type
- spondyloepiphyseal dysplasia congenita
- spondyloperipheral dysplasia
- Stickler syndrome, (COL2A1-related)
- Stuttering
- Triose Phosphate Isomerase deficiency
- tyrosinemia
- Von Willebrand Disease

== Cytogenetic band ==
G-banding ideograms of human chromosome 12

G-banding ideogram of human chromosome 12 in resolution 850 bphs. Band length in this diagram is proportional to base-pair length. This type of ideogram is generally used in genome browsers (e.g. Ensembl, UCSC Genome Browser).

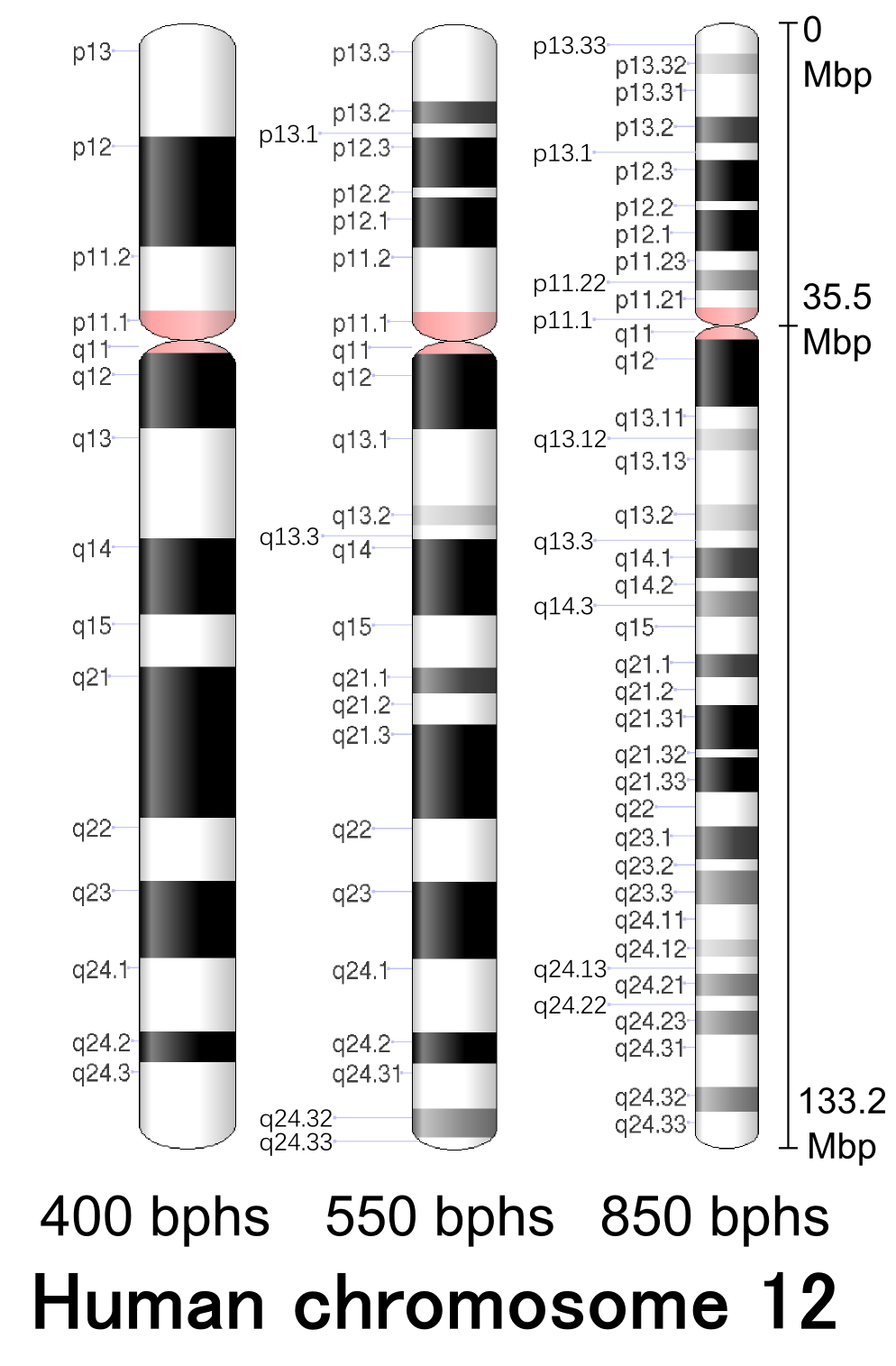
G-banding patterns of human chromosome 12 in three different resolutions (400, 550 and 850). Band length in this diagram is based on the ideograms from ISCN (2013). This type of ideogram represents actual relative band length observed under a microscope at the different moments during the mitotic process.

G-bands of human chromosome 12 in resolution 850 bphs
Chr.	Arm	Band	ISCN start	ISCN stop	Basepair start	Basepair stop	Stain	Density
12	p	13.33	0	216	1	3,200,000	gneg	
12	p	13.32	216	345	3,200,001	5,300,000	gpos	25
12	p	13.31	345	633	5,300,001	10,000,000	gneg	
12	p	13.2	633	806	10,000,001	12,600,000	gpos	75
12	p	13.1	806	921	12,600,001	14,600,000	gneg	
12	p	12.3	921	1195	14,600,001	19,800,000	gpos	100
12	p	12.2	1195	1252	19,800,001	21,100,000	gneg	
12	p	12.1	1252	1526	21,100,001	26,300,000	gpos	100
12	p	11.23	1526	1655	26,300,001	27,600,000	gneg	
12	p	11.22	1655	1785	27,600,001	30,500,000	gpos	50
12	p	11.21	1785	1900	30,500,001	33,200,000	gneg	
12	p	11.1	1900	2015	33,200,001	35,500,000	acen	
12	q	11	2015	2116	35,500,001	37,800,000	acen	
12	q	12	2116	2562	37,800,001	46,000,000	gpos	100
12	q	13.11	2562	2706	46,000,001	48,700,000	gneg	
12	q	13.12	2706	2850	48,700,001	51,100,000	gpos	25
12	q	13.13	2850	3210	51,100,001	54,500,000	gneg	
12	q	13.2	3210	3383	54,500,001	56,200,000	gpos	25
12	q	13.3	3383	3498	56,200,001	57,700,000	gneg	
12	q	14.1	3498	3700	57,700,001	62,700,000	gpos	75
12	q	14.2	3700	3786	62,700,001	64,700,000	gneg	
12	q	14.3	3786	3959	64,700,001	67,300,000	gpos	50
12	q	15	3959	4203	67,300,001	71,100,000	gneg	
12	q	21.1	4203	4362	71,100,001	75,300,000	gpos	75
12	q	21.2	4362	4549	75,300,001	79,900,000	gneg	
12	q	21.31	4549	4837	79,900,001	86,300,000	gpos	100
12	q	21.32	4837	4894	86,300,001	88,600,000	gneg	
12	q	21.33	4894	5125	88,600,001	92,200,000	gpos	100
12	q	22	5125	5355	92,200,001	95,800,000	gneg	
12	q	23.1	5355	5571	95,800,001	101,200,000	gpos	75
12	q	23.2	5571	5643	101,200,001	103,500,000	gneg	
12	q	23.3	5643	5873	103,500,001	108,600,000	gpos	50
12	q	24.11	5873	6104	108,600,001	111,300,000	gneg	
12	q	24.12	6104	6219	111,300,001	111,900,000	gpos	25
12	q	24.13	6219	6334	111,900,001	113,900,000	gneg	
12	q	24.21	6334	6478	113,900,001	116,400,000	gpos	50
12	q	24.22	6478	6579	116,400,001	117,700,000	gneg	
12	q	24.23	6579	6737	117,700,001	120,300,000	gpos	50
12	q	24.31	6737	7083	120,300,001	125,400,000	gneg	
12	q	24.32	7083	7255	125,400,001	128,700,000	gpos	50
12	q	24.33	7255	7500	128,700,001	133,275,309	gneg	
