= PTMS =

PTMS may refer to

- Parathymosin, a human gene
- Petition to make special, in United States patent law
- Photothermal microspectroscopy, an instrumental technique
