= Family with sequence similarity 186 member B =

Protein-coding gene in the species Homo sapiens

FAM186B

Identifiers
- Aliases: FAM186B, C12orf25, family with sequence similarity 186 member B
- External IDs: MGI: 3647604; HomoloGene: 69502; GeneCards: FAM186B; OMA:FAM186B - orthologs

Gene location (Human)
Chr.	Chromosome 12 (human)
Band	12q13.12	Start	49,582,885 bp
Band	12q13.12	End	49,605,639 bp

Gene location (Mouse)
Chr.	Chromosome 15 (mouse)
Band	15|15 F1	Start	99,168,899 bp
Band	15|15 F1	End	99,193,769 bp
RNA expression pattern
Bgee	Human / Mouse (ortholog); Top expressed in: left testis; right testis; testicle; gonad; epithelium of colon; sural nerve; striated muscle tissue; skeletal muscle tissue; stromal cell of endometrium; pharynx / Top expressed in: spermatid; spermatocyte; testicle; embryo; neural layer of retina; ovary; adrenal gland; olfactory bulb; hypothalamus; cerebellar cortex; More reference expression data
BioGPS	n/a
Orthologs
Species	Human	Mouse
Entrez	84070	545136
Ensembl	ENSG00000135436	ENSMUSG00000078907
UniProt	Q8IYM0	D3Z420
RefSeq (mRNA)	NM_032130	NM_001081254
RefSeq (protein)	NP_115506	NP_001074723
Location (UCSC)	Chr 12: 49.58 – 49.61 Mb	Chr 15: 99.17 – 99.19 Mb
PubMed search
- Wikidata
View/Edit Human	View/Edit Mouse

Family with sequence similarity 186 member B is a protein that in humans is encoded by the FAM186B gene.
