= THAP2 =

Protein-coding gene in the species Homo sapiens

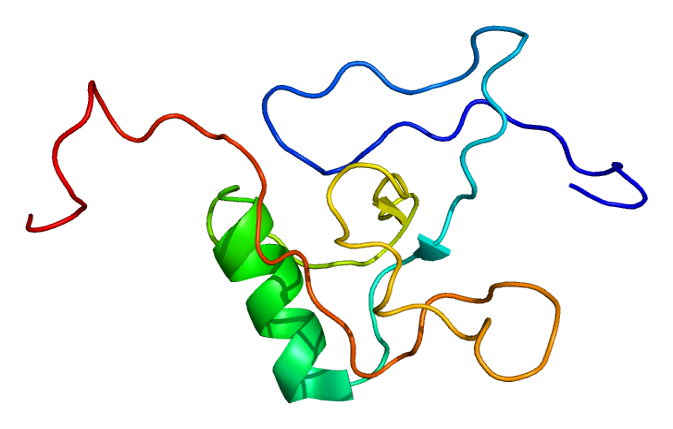

Identifiers
- Aliases: THAP2, THAP domain containing 2
- External IDs: OMIM: 612531; MGI: 1914066; GeneCards: THAP2
Available structures
PDB	Ortholog search: PDBe RCSB
PDB	List of PDB id codes 2D8R

Gene location (Human)
Chr.	Chromosome 12 (human)
Band	12q21.1	Start	71,664,301 bp
Band	12q21.1	End	71,680,644 bp

Gene location (Mouse)
Chr.	Chromosome 10 (mouse)
Band	10|10 D2	Start	115,204,309 bp
Band	10|10 D2	End	115,220,348 bp
RNA expression pattern
Bgee	Human / Mouse (ortholog); Top expressed in: ganglionic eminence; ventricular zone; left testis; right testis; testicle; monocyte; anterior pituitary; appendix; right uterine tube; gallbladder / Top expressed in: lacrimal gland; trigeminal ganglion; medial ganglionic eminence; tail of embryo; genital tubercle; ventricular zone; transitional epithelium of urinary bladder; migratory enteric neural crest cell; parotid gland; atrioventricular valve; More reference expression data
BioGPS	n/a
Gene ontology
Molecular function	metal ion binding; DNA binding; nucleic acid binding; DNA-binding transcription factor activity, RNA polymerase II-specific
Cellular component	nucleolus
Biological process	regulation of transcription by RNA polymerase II
Sources:Amigo / QuickGO
Orthologs
Databases	NCBI: entry; OMA: entry
Species	Human	Mouse
Entrez	83591	66816
Ensembl	ENSG00000173451	ENSMUSG00000020137
UniProt	Q9H0W7	Q9D305
RefSeq (mRNA)	NM_031435	NM_025780
RefSeq (protein)	NP_113623	NP_080056
Location (UCSC)	Chr 12: 71.66 – 71.68 Mb	Chr 10: 115.2 – 115.22 Mb
PubMed search
- Wikidata
View/Edit Human	View/Edit Mouse

THAP domain-containing protein 2 is a protein that in humans is encoded by the THAP2 gene.
