= SLC8B1 =

Protein-coding gene in the species Homo sapiens

Identifiers
- Aliases: SLC8B1, NCKX6, NCLX, SLC24A6, solute carrier family 8 member B1
- External IDs: OMIM: 609841; MGI: 2180781; GeneCards: SLC8B1

Gene location (Human)
Chr.	Chromosome 12 (human)
Band	12q24.13	Start	113,298,759 bp
Band	12q24.13	End	113,359,493 bp

Gene location (Mouse)
Chr.	Chromosome 5 (mouse)
Band	5|5 F	Start	120,649,233 bp
Band	5|5 F	End	120,672,089 bp
RNA expression pattern
Bgee	Human / Mouse (ortholog); Top expressed in: left adrenal cortex; right adrenal gland; right adrenal cortex; left ovary; right ovary; spleen; mucosa of transverse colon; sural nerve; granulocyte; epithelium of colon / Top expressed in: granulocyte; stroma of bone marrow; decidua; left lobe of liver; lip; tibiofemoral joint; yolk sac; left colon; gastrula; mesenteric lymph nodes; More reference expression data
BioGPS	n/a
Gene ontology
Molecular function	protein homodimerization activity; identical protein binding; antiporter activity; calcium:cation antiporter activity; calcium:sodium antiporter activity; calcium:sodium antiporter activity involved in regulation of cardiac muscle cell membrane potential
Cellular component	integral component of membrane; membrane; plasma membrane; mitochondrial crista; mitochondrion; integral component of mitochondrial membrane; sarcolemma; mitochondrial inner membrane
Biological process	sodium ion transmembrane transport; regulation of cytosolic calcium ion concentration; glucose homeostasis; response to stimulus; regulation of insulin secretion; sodium ion transport; ion transport; calcium ion transmembrane transport; regulation of cardiac muscle cell membrane potential; calcium ion transport; transmembrane transport; mitochondrial calcium ion transmembrane transport; mitochondrial calcium ion homeostasis; calcium export from the mitochondrion; regulation of lymphocyte chemotaxis; regulation of store-operated calcium entry
Sources:Amigo / QuickGO
Orthologs
Databases	NCBI: entry; OMA: entry
Species	Human	Mouse
Entrez	80024	170756
Ensembl	ENSG00000089060	ENSMUSG00000032754
UniProt	Q6J4K2	Q925Q3
RefSeq (mRNA)	NM_024959; NM_001330466; NM_001358345	NM_001177594; NM_001177595; NM_133221
RefSeq (protein)	NP_001317395; NP_079235; NP_001345274	NP_001171065; NP_001171066; NP_573484
Location (UCSC)	Chr 12: 113.3 – 113.36 Mb	Chr 5: 120.65 – 120.67 Mb
PubMed search
- Wikidata
View/Edit Human	View/Edit Mouse

Solute carrier family 8 (sodium/lithium/calcium exchanger), member B1 is a protein that in humans is encoded by the SLC8B1 gene.

== Function ==
SLC24A6 belongs to a family of Potassium-dependent sodium-calcium exchangers that maintain cellular calcium homeostasis through the electrogenic countertransport of 4 sodium ions for 1 calcium ion and 1 potassium ion.
