= CALCOCO1 =

Protein-coding gene in humans

Identifiers
- Aliases: CALCOCO1, Cocoa, calphoglin, PP13275, calcium binding and coiled-coil domain 1
- External IDs: MGI: 1914738; GeneCards: CALCOCO1

Gene location (Human)
Chr.	Chromosome 12 (human)
Band	12q13.13	Start	53,708,517 bp
Band	12q13.13	End	53,727,745 bp

Gene location (Mouse)
Chr.	Chromosome 15 (mouse)
Band	15 F3|15	Start	102,615,212 bp
Band	15 F3|15	End	102,630,613 bp
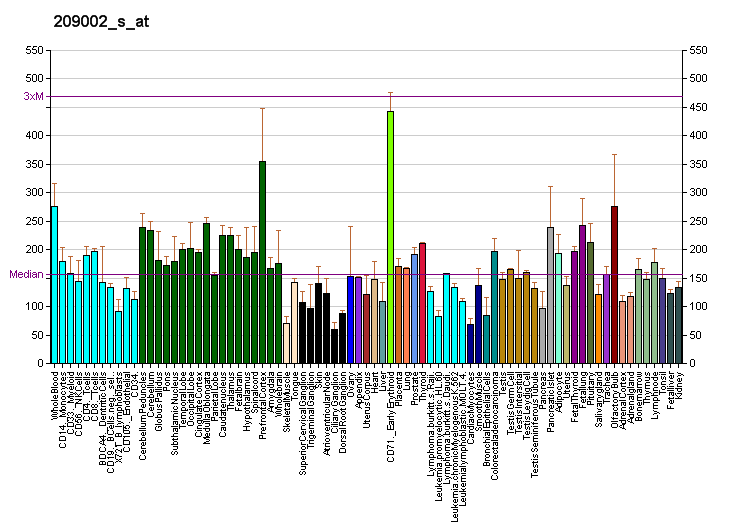
RNA expression pattern
Bgee	Human / Mouse (ortholog); Top expressed in: gastric mucosa; skin of leg; Descending thoracic aorta; right hemisphere of cerebellum; popliteal artery; tibial arteries; skin of abdomen; right coronary artery; ascending aorta; muscle layer of sigmoid colon / Top expressed in: ascending aorta; genital tubercle; zygote; lip; muscle of thigh; aortic valve; interventricular septum; neural layer of retina; esophagus; dentate gyrus of hippocampal formation granule cell; More reference expression data
BioGPS	More reference expression data
Gene ontology
Molecular function	sequence-specific DNA binding; beta-catenin binding; transcription coactivator activity; chromatin binding; transcription coregulator activity; protein C-terminus binding; protein binding; nuclear receptor coactivator activity; armadillo repeat domain binding; RNA polymerase II cis-regulatory region sequence-specific DNA binding
Cellular component	intracellular membrane-bounded organelle; nucleus; cytoplasm; cytosol
Biological process	regulation of transcription, DNA-templated; intracellular steroid hormone receptor signaling pathway; Wnt signaling pathway; transcription, DNA-templated; positive regulation of transcription, DNA-templated; signal transduction; positive regulation of transcription by RNA polymerase II; positive regulation of gene expression
Sources:Amigo / QuickGO
Orthologs
Databases	NCBI: entry; OMA: entry
Species	Human	Mouse
Entrez	57658	67488
Ensembl	ENSG00000012822	ENSMUSG00000023055
UniProt	Q9P1Z2	Q8CGU1
RefSeq (mRNA)	NM_001143682; NM_020898	NM_026192
RefSeq (protein)	NP_001137154; NP_065949	NP_080468
Location (UCSC)	Chr 12: 53.71 – 53.73 Mb	Chr 15: 102.62 – 102.63 Mb
PubMed search
- Wikidata
View/Edit Human	View/Edit Mouse

Calcium-binding and coiled-coil domain-containing protein 1 is a protein that in humans is encoded by the CALCOCO1 gene.
