= UTP20 =

Protein-coding gene in the species Homo sapiens

Identifiers
- Aliases: UTP20, DRIM, 1A6/DRIM, small subunit processome component, UTP20 small subunit processome component
- External IDs: OMIM: 612822; MGI: 1917933; GeneCards: UTP20

Gene location (Human)
| Chr. | Chromosome 12 (human) |
| Band | 12q23.2 | Start | 101,280,105 bp |
| Band | 12q23.2 | End | 101,386,618 bp |

Gene location (Mouse)
| Chr. | Chromosome 10 (mouse) |
| Band | 10|10 C1 | Start | 88,582,469 bp |
| Band | 10|10 C1 | End | 88,662,666 bp |
RNA expression pattern
| Bgee | Human / Mouse (ortholog); Top expressed in: testicle; tendon of biceps brachii; minor salivary glands; gonad; Achilles tendon; ventricular zone; secondary oocyte; optic nerve; stromal cell of endometrium; gastrocnemius muscle / Top expressed in: primitive streak; endothelial cell of lymphatic vessel; epiblast; secondary oocyte; primary oocyte; tail of embryo; mandibular prominence; hair follicle; maxillary prominence; genital tubercle; More reference expression data |
| BioGPS | n/a |
Gene ontology
| Molecular function | protein binding; RNA binding |
| Cellular component | cytoplasm; preribosome, small subunit precursor; small-subunit processome; nucleolus; nucleus; 90S preribosome; nucleoplasm; plasma membrane |
| Biological process | endonucleolytic cleavage in 5'-ETS of tricistronic rRNA transcript (SSU-rRNA, 5.8S rRNA, LSU-rRNA); endonucleolytic cleavage to generate mature 5'-end of SSU-rRNA from (SSU-rRNA, 5.8S rRNA, LSU-rRNA); endonucleolytic cleavage in ITS1 to separate SSU-rRNA from 5.8S rRNA and LSU-rRNA from tricistronic rRNA transcript (SSU-rRNA, 5.8S rRNA, LSU-rRNA); negative regulation of cell population proliferation; maturation of SSU-rRNA from tricistronic rRNA transcript (SSU-rRNA, 5.8S rRNA, LSU-rRNA); rRNA processing |
Sources:Amigo / QuickGO
Orthologs
| Databases | NCBI: entry; OMA: entry |
| Species | Human | Mouse |
| Entrez | 27340 | 70683 |
| Ensembl | ENSG00000120800 | ENSMUSG00000004356 |
| UniProt | O75691 | Q5XG71 |
| RefSeq (mRNA) | NM_014503 | NM_175158 |
| RefSeq (protein) | NP_055318 | NP_780367 |
| Location (UCSC) | Chr 12: 101.28 – 101.39 Mb | Chr 10: 88.58 – 88.66 Mb |
| PubMed search |
- Wikidata
| View/Edit Human | View/Edit Mouse |

Small subunit processome component 20 homolog is a protein that in humans is encoded by the UTP20 gene.
