= NRIP2 =

Protein-coding gene in the species Homo sapiens

Identifiers
- Aliases: NRIP2, nuclear receptor interacting protein 2
- External IDs: MGI: 1891884; HomoloGene: 11023; GeneCards: NRIP2; OMA:NRIP2 - orthologs

Gene location (Human)
Chr.	Chromosome 12 (human)
Band	12p13.33	Start	2,825,348 bp
Band	12p13.33	End	2,835,544 bp

Gene location (Mouse)
Chr.	Chromosome 6 (mouse)
Band	6|6 F3	Start	128,376,259 bp
Band	6|6 F3	End	128,393,390 bp
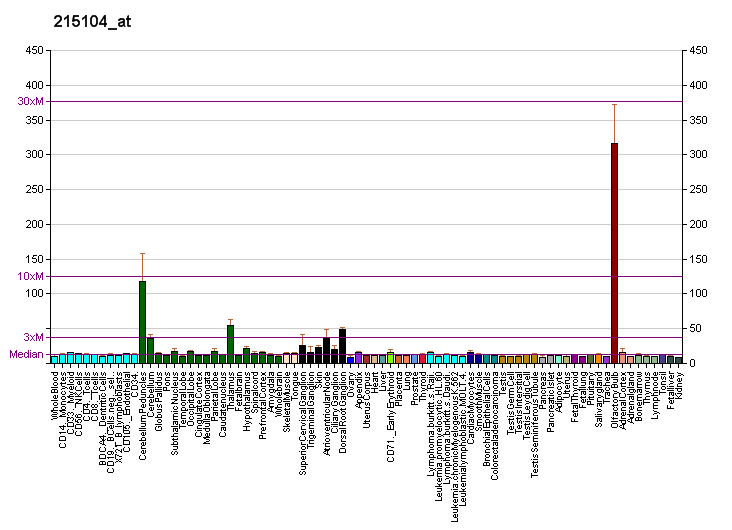
RNA expression pattern
Bgee	Human / Mouse (ortholog); Top expressed in: olfactory bulb; cerebellar hemisphere; right hemisphere of cerebellum; tibial nerve; sural nerve; tibial arteries; trigeminal ganglion; right coronary artery; pons; gonad / Top expressed in: hypothalamus; cerebellar cortex; dentate gyrus of hippocampal formation granule cell; neural layer of retina; olfactory bulb; primary visual cortex; hippocampus proper; superior frontal gyrus; striatum of neuraxis; ovary; More reference expression data
BioGPS	More reference expression data
Gene ontology
Molecular function	protein binding; aspartic-type endopeptidase activity
Cellular component	cytoplasm; nucleus
Biological process	regulation of transcription, DNA-templated; transcription, DNA-templated; proteolysis
Sources:Amigo / QuickGO
Orthologs
Species	Human	Mouse
Entrez	83714	60345
Ensembl	ENSG00000053702	ENSMUSG00000001520
UniProt	Q9BQI9	Q9JHR9
RefSeq (mRNA)	NM_031474	NM_001162858; NM_021717
RefSeq (protein)	NP_113662	NP_001156330; NP_068363
Location (UCSC)	Chr 12: 2.83 – 2.84 Mb	Chr 6: 128.38 – 128.39 Mb
PubMed search
- Wikidata
View/Edit Human	View/Edit Mouse

Nuclear receptor-interacting protein 2 is a protein that in humans is encoded by the NRIP2 gene.
