= Zinc finger protein 26 =

Protein found in humans

ZNF26

Identifiers
- Aliases: ZNF26, HEL-179, KOX20, zinc finger protein 26
- External IDs: OMIM: 194537; GeneCards: ZNF26

Gene location (Human)
| Chr. | Chromosome 12 (human) |
| Band | 12q24.33 | Start | 132,986,365 bp |
| Band | 12q24.33 | End | 133,032,952 bp |
RNA expression pattern
| Bgee | Human / Mouse (ortholog); Top expressed in: endothelial cell; middle temporal gyrus; pancreatic ductal cell; Brodmann area 23; granulocyte; tibia; ventricular zone; testicle; Epithelium of choroid plexus; monocyte / n/a; More reference expression data |
| BioGPS | n/a |
Gene ontology
| Molecular function | DNA-binding transcription factor activity; DNA binding; protein binding; metal ion binding; nucleic acid binding; DNA-binding transcription factor activity, RNA polymerase II-specific |
| Cellular component | intracellular anatomical structure; nucleus |
| Biological process | regulation of transcription, DNA-templated; transcription, DNA-templated; regulation of transcription by RNA polymerase II |
Sources:Amigo / QuickGO
Orthologs
| Databases | NCBI: entry; OMA: entry |
| Species | Human | Mouse |
| Entrez | 7574 | n/a |
| Ensembl | ENSG00000198393 | n/a |
| UniProt | P17031 | n/a |
| RefSeq (mRNA) | NM_001256279; NM_001256280; NM_019591; NM_001330513; NM_001330514 | n/a |
| RefSeq (protein) | NP_001243208; NP_001243209; NP_001317442; NP_001317443; NP_062537 | n/a |
| Location (UCSC) | Chr 12: 132.99 – 133.03 Mb | n/a |
| PubMed search | | n/a |
- Wikidata
| View/Edit Human |

Zinc finger protein 26 is a protein that in humans is encoded by the ZNF26 gene.
