= ATP2B1 antisense RNA 1 =

Non-coding RNA in humans

ATP2B1-AS1

Identifiers
- Aliases: ATP2B1-AS1, LINC00936, ATP2B1 antisense RNA 1
- External IDs: GeneCards: ATP2B1-AS1

Gene location (Human)
| Chr. | Chromosome 12 (human) |
| Band | 12q21.33 | Start | 89,708,959 bp |
| Band | 12q21.33 | End | 89,712,590 bp |
RNA expression pattern
| Bgee | Human / Mouse (ortholog); Top expressed in: pancreatic ductal cell; endothelial cell; Brodmann area 23; middle temporal gyrus; buccal mucosa cell; entorhinal cortex; cartilage tissue; superior frontal gyrus; postcentral gyrus; primary visual cortex / n/a; More reference expression data |
| BioGPS | n/a |
Orthologs
| Databases | NCBI: entry; OMA: entry |
| Species | Human | Mouse |
| Entrez | 338758 | n/a |
| Ensembl | ENSG00000271614 | n/a |
| UniProt | n a | n/a |
| RefSeq (mRNA) | n/a | n/a |
| RefSeq (protein) | n/a | n/a |
| Location (UCSC) | Chr 12: 89.71 – 89.71 Mb | n/a |
| PubMed search | | n/a |
- Wikidata
| View/Edit Human |

ATP2B1 antisense RNA 1 is a non-coding RNA that in humans is encoded by the ATP2B1-AS1 gene.
