= CRACR2A =

Protein-coding gene in humans

Identifiers
- Aliases: CRACR2A, EFCAB4B, calcium release activated channel regulator 2A, RAB46
- External IDs: OMIM: 614178; MGI: 2685919; GeneCards: CRACR2A
Enzyme activity
EC #	BRENDA	ExPASy	KEGG	MetaCyc
3.6.5.2	↗	↗	↗	↗

Gene location (Human)
Chr.	Chromosome 12 (human)
Band	12p13.32	Start	3,606,633 bp
Band	12p13.32	End	3,764,819 bp

Gene location (Mouse)
Chr.	Chromosome 6 (mouse)
Band	6|6 F3	Start	127,538,301 bp
Band	6|6 F3	End	127,651,211 bp
RNA expression pattern
Bgee	Human / Mouse (ortholog); Top expressed in: parotid gland; mucosa of ileum; mucosa of sigmoid colon; nasal epithelium; rectum; olfactory zone of nasal mucosa; trachea; minor salivary glands; bone marrow cell; bronchial epithelial cell / Top expressed in: granulocyte; colon; lung; jejunum; ileum; morula; thymus; duodenum; bone marrow; stomach; More reference expression data
BioGPS	n/a
Gene ontology
Molecular function	metal ion binding; calcium ion binding; protein binding
Cellular component	cytoplasm; membrane; extracellular region; specific granule lumen
Biological process	ion transport; adaptive immune response; activation of store-operated calcium channel activity; calcium ion transport; store-operated calcium entry; positive regulation of calcium ion transport; immune system process; neutrophil degranulation; transport
Sources:Amigo / QuickGO
Orthologs
Databases	NCBI: entry; OMA: entry
Species	Human	Mouse
Entrez	84766	381812
Ensembl	ENSG00000130038	ENSMUSG00000061414
UniProt	Q9BSW2	Q3UP38
RefSeq (mRNA)	NM_001144958; NM_001144959; NM_032680	NM_001033464; NM_001368877
RefSeq (protein)	NP_001138430; NP_116069	NP_001028636; NP_001355806
Location (UCSC)	Chr 12: 3.61 – 3.76 Mb	Chr 6: 127.54 – 127.65 Mb
PubMed search
- Wikidata
View/Edit Human	View/Edit Mouse

Calcium release activated channel regulator 2A is a protein that in humans is encoded by the CRACR2A gene.
