= HNF1A-AS1 =

Non-coding RNA found in humans

Identifiers
- Aliases: HNF1A-AS1, C12orf27, NCRNA00262, HNF1A-AS1 (gene), HNF1A antisense RNA 1, HAS1
- External IDs: GeneCards: HNF1A-AS1

Gene location (Human)
Chr.	Chromosome 12 (human)
Band	12q24.31	Start	120,941,728 bp
Band	12q24.31	End	120,980,965 bp
RNA expression pattern
Bgee	Human / Mouse (ortholog); Top expressed in: mucosa of transverse colon; epithelium of colon; rectum; body of pancreas; right lobe of liver; human kidney; gallbladder; duodenum; stomach; body of stomach / n/a; More reference expression data
BioGPS	n/a
Orthologs
Databases	NCBI: entry; OMA: entry
Species	Human	Mouse
Entrez	283460	n/a
Ensembl	ENSG00000241388	n/a
UniProt	n a	n/a
RefSeq (mRNA)	n/a	n/a
RefSeq (protein)	n/a	n/a
Location (UCSC)	Chr 12: 120.94 – 120.98 Mb	n/a
PubMed search		n/a
- Wikidata
View/Edit Human

HNF1A antisense RNA 1 is a non-coding RNA that in humans is encoded by the HNF1A-AS1 gene.
