= Zinc finger C3H1-type containing =

Protein-coding gene in the species Homo sapiens

ZFC3H1

Identifiers
- Aliases: ZFC3H1, CCDC131, PSRC2, CSRC2, zinc finger C3H1-type containing
- External IDs: MGI: 2446143; GeneCards: ZFC3H1

Gene location (Human)
Chr.	Chromosome 12 (human)
Band	12q21.1	Start	71,609,599 bp
Band	12q21.1	End	71,667,725 bp

Gene location (Mouse)
Chr.	Chromosome 10 (mouse)
Band	10|10 D2	Start	115,220,864 bp
Band	10|10 D2	End	115,268,677 bp
RNA expression pattern
Bgee	Human / Mouse (ortholog); Top expressed in: sperm; right hemisphere of cerebellum; vagina; buccal mucosa cell; right ovary; body of pancreas; right lung; left ovary; spleen; skin of abdomen / Top expressed in: neural layer of retina; otolith organ; utricle; renal corpuscle; tail of embryo; granulocyte; genital tubercle; medullary collecting duct; Paneth cell; thymus; More reference expression data
BioGPS	n/a
Gene ontology
Molecular function	metal ion binding; protein binding; RNA binding
Cellular component	extracellular space; exosome (RNase complex); nucleolus; nucleus
Biological process	RNA processing
Sources:Amigo / QuickGO
Orthologs
Databases	NCBI: entry; OMA: entry
Species	Human	Mouse
Entrez	196441	216345
Ensembl	ENSG00000133858	ENSMUSG00000034163
UniProt	O60293	n/a
RefSeq (mRNA)	NM_144982	NM_001033261
RefSeq (protein)	NP_659419	n/a
Location (UCSC)	Chr 12: 71.61 – 71.67 Mb	Chr 10: 115.22 – 115.27 Mb
PubMed search
- Wikidata
View/Edit Human	View/Edit Mouse

Zinc finger C3H1-type containing is a protein that in humans is encoded by the ZFC3H1 gene.
