= DPPA3 =

Protein-coding gene in humans

Identifiers
- Aliases: DPPA3, STELLA, developmental pluripotency associated 3, Pgc7
- External IDs: OMIM: 608408; HomoloGene: 138483; GeneCards: DPPA3; OMA:DPPA3 - orthologs

Gene location (Human)
Chr.	Chromosome 12 (human)
Band	12p13.31	Start	7,711,433 bp
Band	12p13.31	End	7,717,559 bp
RNA expression pattern
Bgee	Human / Mouse (ortholog); Top expressed in: gonad; testicle; duodenum; ventricular zone; right testis; blood; muscle tissue; left testis; liver; right ovary / n/a; More reference expression data
BioGPS	n/a
Gene ontology
Molecular function	methylated histone binding
Cellular component	male pronucleus; cytoplasm; nucleus; female pronucleus
Biological process	multicellular organism development; protection of DNA demethylation of female pronucleus; negative regulation of DNA demethylation; regulation of genetic imprinting; chromatin organization
Sources:Amigo / QuickGO
Orthologs
Species	Human	Mouse
Entrez	359787	n/a
Ensembl	ENSG00000187569	n/a
UniProt	Q6W0C5	n/a
RefSeq (mRNA)	NM_199286	n/a
RefSeq (protein)	NP_954980	n/a
Location (UCSC)	Chr 12: 7.71 – 7.72 Mb	n/a
PubMed search		n/a
- Wikidata
View/Edit Human

Developmental pluripotency-associated protein 3 is a protein that in humans is encoded by the DPPA3 gene.

This gene encodes a protein that in mice may function as a maternal factor during the preimplantation stage of development. In mice, this gene may play a role in transcriptional repression, cell division, and maintenance of cell pluripotentiality. In humans, related intronless loci are located on chromosomes 14 and X.
