= PUS7L =

Protein-coding gene in the species Homo sapiens

Identifiers
- Aliases: PUS7L, pseudouridylate synthase 7 like, pseudouridine synthase 7 like
- External IDs: MGI: 1926145; HomoloGene: 12842; GeneCards: PUS7L; OMA:PUS7L - orthologs

Gene location (Human)
Chr.	Chromosome 12 (human)
Band	12q12	Start	43,718,992 bp
Band	12q12	End	43,758,793 bp

Gene location (Mouse)
Chr.	Chromosome 15 (mouse)
Band	15|15 E3	Start	94,420,569 bp
Band	15|15 E3	End	94,441,428 bp
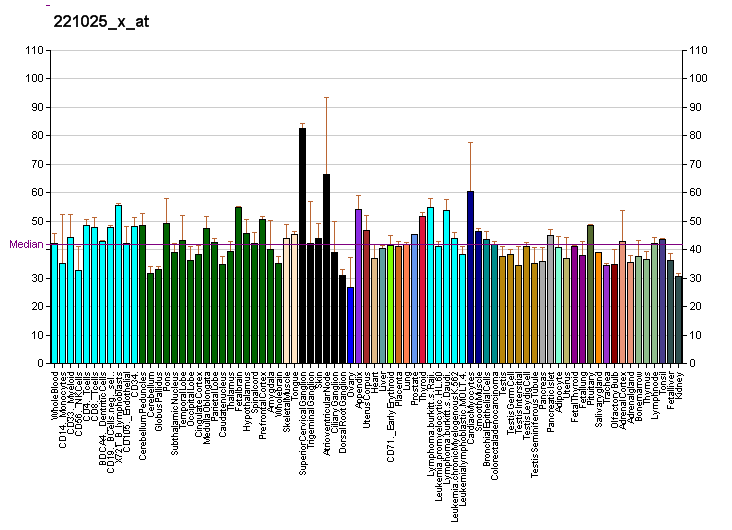
RNA expression pattern
Bgee	Human / Mouse (ortholog); Top expressed in: Achilles tendon; epithelium of colon; secondary oocyte; testicle; tibia; corpus epididymis; corpus callosum; gonad; tonsil; bone marrow cells / Top expressed in: otic vesicle; medullary collecting duct; Paneth cell; ureter; condyle; primitive streak; trigeminal ganglion; endothelial cell of lymphatic vessel; lumbar spinal ganglion; fossa; More reference expression data
BioGPS	More reference expression data
Gene ontology
Molecular function	pseudouridine synthase activity; protein binding; isomerase activity; RNA binding
Cellular component	nucleus
Biological process	RNA modification; pseudouridine synthesis; tRNA processing
Sources:Amigo / QuickGO
Orthologs
Species	Human	Mouse
Entrez	83448	78895
Ensembl	ENSG00000129317	ENSMUSG00000033356
UniProt	Q9H0K6	Q8CE46
RefSeq (mRNA)	NM_001098614; NM_001098615; NM_001271826; NM_031292	NM_172437
RefSeq (protein)	NP_001092084; NP_001092085; NP_001258755; NP_112582	NP_766025
Location (UCSC)	Chr 12: 43.72 – 43.76 Mb	Chr 15: 94.42 – 94.44 Mb
PubMed search
- Wikidata
View/Edit Human	View/Edit Mouse

Pseudouridylate synthase 7 homolog-like protein is an enzyme that in humans is encoded by the PUS7L gene.
