= ZCCHC8 =

Protein-coding gene in the species Homo sapiens

Identifiers
- Aliases: ZCCHC8, zinc finger CCHC-type containing 8, PFBMFT5
- External IDs: OMIM: 616381; MGI: 1917900; GeneCards: ZCCHC8

Gene location (Human)
Chr.	Chromosome 12 (human)
Band	12q24.31	Start	122,471,599 bp
Band	12q24.31	End	122,501,073 bp

Gene location (Mouse)
Chr.	Chromosome 5 (mouse)
Band	5|5 F	Start	123,836,357 bp
Band	5|5 F	End	123,859,163 bp
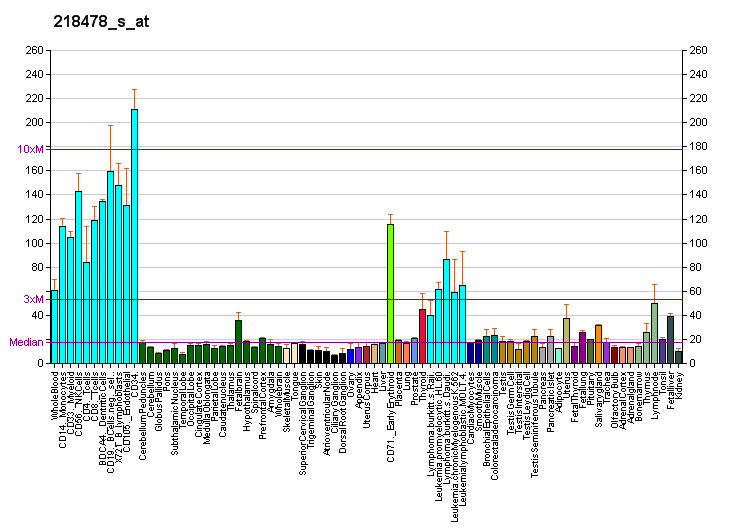

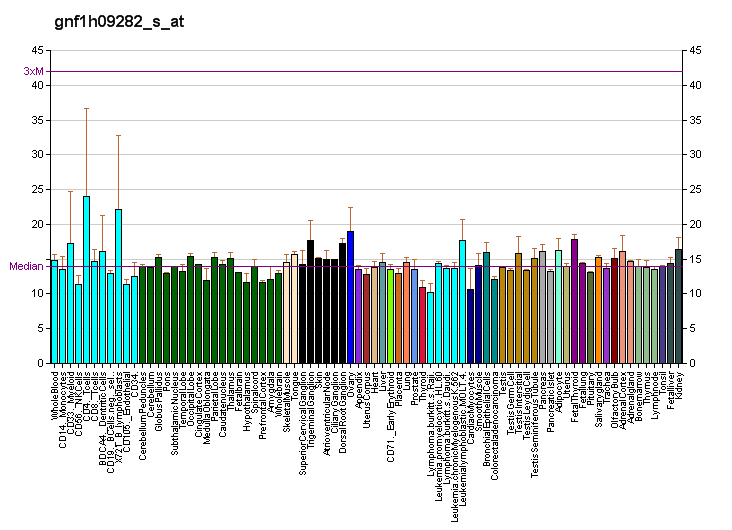
RNA expression pattern
Bgee	Human / Mouse (ortholog); Top expressed in: sperm; endothelial cell; oocyte; gingival epithelium; secondary oocyte; amniotic fluid; tibia; skin of thigh; visceral pleura; germinal epithelium / Top expressed in: zygote; secondary oocyte; primary oocyte; renal corpuscle; spermatid; granulocyte; neural layer of retina; medullary collecting duct; tail of embryo; thymus; More reference expression data
BioGPS	More reference expression data
Gene ontology
Molecular function	protein binding; zinc ion binding; metal ion binding; nucleic acid binding; RNA binding
Cellular component	catalytic step 2 spliceosome; spliceosomal complex; nucleoplasm; nuclear body; nucleus; nucleolus; TRAMP complex
Biological process	mRNA splicing, via spliceosome; mRNA processing; RNA splicing
Sources:Amigo / QuickGO
Orthologs
Databases	NCBI: entry; OMA: entry
Species	Human	Mouse
Entrez	55596	70650
Ensembl	ENSG00000033030	ENSMUSG00000029427
UniProt	Q6NZY4	Q9CYA6
RefSeq (mRNA)	NM_017612; NM_001350935; NM_001350936; NM_001350937; NM_001350938	NM_027494
RefSeq (protein)	NP_060082; NP_001337864; NP_001337865; NP_001337866; NP_001337867	NP_081770
Location (UCSC)	Chr 12: 122.47 – 122.5 Mb	Chr 5: 123.84 – 123.86 Mb
PubMed search
- Wikidata
View/Edit Human	View/Edit Mouse

Zinc finger CCHC domain-containing protein 8 is a protein that in humans is encoded by the ZCCHC8 gene.
