= ZNF664 =

Protein-coding gene in the species Homo sapiens

Identifiers
- Aliases: ZNF664, ZFOC1, ZNF176, zinc finger protein 664
- External IDs: OMIM: 617890; MGI: 2442505; GeneCards: ZNF664

Gene location (Human)
Chr.	Chromosome 12 (human)
Band	12q24.31	Start	123,971,845 bp
Band	12q24.31	End	124,015,439 bp

Gene location (Mouse)
Chr.	Chromosome 5 (mouse)
Band	5|5 G1.1	Start	124,939,755 bp
Band	5|5 G1.1	End	124,979,757 bp
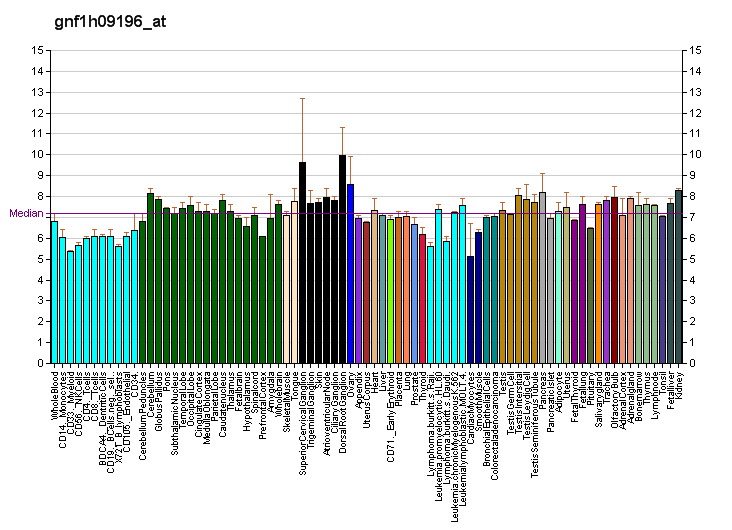
RNA expression pattern
Bgee	Human / Mouse (ortholog); Top expressed in: mucosa of ileum; secondary oocyte; bronchial epithelial cell; myocardium of left ventricle; cardiac muscle tissue of right atrium; jejunal mucosa; germinal epithelium; corpus epididymis; external globus pallidus; mucosa of paranasal sinus / Top expressed in: hand; superior cervical ganglion; otolith organ; utricle; genital tubercle; secondary oocyte; ventricular zone; zygote; tail of embryo; otic vesicle; More reference expression data
BioGPS	More reference expression data
Gene ontology
Molecular function	DNA binding; metal ion binding; nucleic acid binding; molecular function; DNA-binding transcription factor activity, RNA polymerase II-specific
Cellular component	nucleus
Biological process	transcription, DNA-templated; regulation of transcription, DNA-templated; biological process; regulation of transcription by RNA polymerase II
Sources:Amigo / QuickGO
Orthologs
Databases	NCBI: entry; OMA: entry
Species	Human	Mouse
Entrez	144348	269704
Ensembl	ENSG00000179195	ENSMUSG00000079215
UniProt	Q8N3J9	Q4VA44
RefSeq (mRNA)	NM_152437; NM_001204298	NM_001081750
RefSeq (protein)	NP_001191227; NP_689650	NP_001075219
Location (UCSC)	Chr 12: 123.97 – 124.02 Mb	Chr 5: 124.94 – 124.98 Mb
PubMed search
- Wikidata
View/Edit Human	View/Edit Mouse

Zinc finger protein 664 is a protein that in humans is encoded by the ZNF664 gene.
