= RAB3IP =

Protein-coding gene in the species Homo sapiens

Available structures
PDB	Ortholog search: PDBe RCSB
PDB	List of PDB id codes 4LHX, 4LHY, 4LHZ, 4UJ3, 4UJ4, 4UJ5

Identifiers
- Aliases: RAB3IP, RABIN3, RABIN8, RAB3A interacting protein
- External IDs: OMIM: 608686; MGI: 105933; HomoloGene: 32340; GeneCards: RAB3IP; OMA:RAB3IP - orthologs

Gene location (Human)
Chr.	Chromosome 12 (human)
Band	12q15	Start	69,738,860 bp
Band	12q15	End	69,823,204 bp

Gene location (Mouse)
Chr.	Chromosome 10 (mouse)
Band	10 D2|10 64.96 cM	Start	116,741,689 bp
Band	10 D2|10 64.96 cM	End	116,786,674 bp
RNA expression pattern
Bgee	Human / Mouse (ortholog); Top expressed in: right testis; left testis; islet of Langerhans; gonad; olfactory zone of nasal mucosa; cerebellar vermis; human kidney; testicle; body of pancreas; cerebellar hemisphere / Top expressed in: right kidney; human kidney; proximal tubule; seminiferous tubule; spermatid; retinal pigment epithelium; medullary collecting duct; utricle; yolk sac; spermatocyte; More reference expression data
BioGPS	n/a
Gene ontology
Molecular function	protein binding; guanyl-nucleotide exchange factor activity; identical protein binding
Cellular component	cytoplasm; ciliary basal body; cytosol; centrosome; cell projection; cytoskeleton; lamellipodium; nucleus
Biological process	protein localization to organelle; protein transport; Golgi to plasma membrane transport; protein targeting to membrane; cilium assembly; ciliary basal body-plasma membrane docking
Sources:Amigo / QuickGO
Orthologs
Species	Human	Mouse
Entrez	117177	216363
Ensembl	ENSG00000127328	ENSMUSG00000064181
UniProt	Q96QF0	Q68EF0
RefSeq (mRNA)	NM_001024647; NM_001278402; NM_022456; NM_175623; NM_175624 NM_175625; NM_175626; NM_175627	NM_001003950; NM_001359645
RefSeq (protein)	NP_001019818; NP_001265331; NP_071901; NP_783322; NP_783323 NP_783324	NP_001003950; NP_001346574
Location (UCSC)	Chr 12: 69.74 – 69.82 Mb	Chr 10: 116.74 – 116.79 Mb
PubMed search
- Wikidata
View/Edit Human	View/Edit Mouse

RAB3A-interacting protein is a protein that in humans is encoded by the RAB3IP gene.
