= VPS37B subunit of ESCRT-I =

Protein-coding gene in the species Homo sapiens

VPS37B

Identifiers
- Aliases: VPS37B, ESCRT-I subunit, VPS37B subunit of ESCRT-I
- External IDs: OMIM: 610037; MGI: 1916724; GeneCards: VPS37B

Gene location (Human)
Chr.	Chromosome 12 (human)
Band	12q24.31	Start	122,865,330 bp
Band	12q24.31	End	122,896,127 bp

Gene location (Mouse)
Chr.	Chromosome 5 (mouse)
Band	5|5 F	Start	124,142,704 bp
Band	5|5 F	End	124,170,333 bp
RNA expression pattern
Bgee	Human / Mouse (ortholog); Top expressed in: sural nerve; ventricular zone; oocyte; cartilage tissue; olfactory zone of nasal mucosa; secondary oocyte; mucosa of transverse colon; pancreatic ductal cell; body of stomach; palpebral conjunctiva / Top expressed in: ventricular zone; granulocyte; Rostral migratory stream; otic vesicle; saccule; adrenal gland; vestibular sensory epithelium; ganglionic eminence; neural tube; zygote; More reference expression data
BioGPS	n/a
Gene ontology
Molecular function	calcium-dependent protein binding; protein binding
Cellular component	cytoplasm; endosome; membrane; late endosome membrane; plasma membrane; midbody; endosome membrane; extracellular exosome; ESCRT I complex; host cell; intracellular membrane-bounded organelle
Biological process	intracellular transport of virus; viral budding via host ESCRT complex; viral life cycle; multivesicular body assembly; endosomal transport; protein transport; macroautophagy; transport; protein targeting to membrane; protein targeting to vacuole; endosome transport via multivesicular body sorting pathway; ubiquitin-dependent protein catabolic process via the multivesicular body sorting pathway
Sources:Amigo / QuickGO
Orthologs
Databases	NCBI: entry; OMA: entry
Species	Human	Mouse
Entrez	79720	330192
Ensembl	ENSG00000139722	ENSMUSG00000066278
UniProt	Q9H9H4	Q8R0J7
RefSeq (mRNA)	NM_024667	NM_177876
RefSeq (protein)	NP_078943	NP_808544
Location (UCSC)	Chr 12: 122.87 – 122.9 Mb	Chr 5: 124.14 – 124.17 Mb
PubMed search
- Wikidata
View/Edit Human	View/Edit Mouse

VPS37B subunit of ESCRT-I (also called Vacuolar protein sorting-associated protein 37B) is a protein that in humans is encoded by the VPS37B gene.
