= SINHCAF =

Protein-coding gene in humans

Identifiers
- Aliases: SINHCAF, C12orf14, TERA, L4, FAM60A, family with sequence similarity 60 member A, SIN3-HDAC complex associated factor
- External IDs: OMIM: 615027; MGI: 1929091; GeneCards: SINHCAF

Gene location (Human)
Chr.	Chromosome 12 (human)
Band	12p11.21	Start	31,280,584 bp
Band	12p11.21	End	31,327,058 bp

Gene location (Mouse)
Chr.	Chromosome 6 (mouse)
Band	6|6 G3	Start	148,822,533 bp
Band	6|6 G3	End	148,847,965 bp
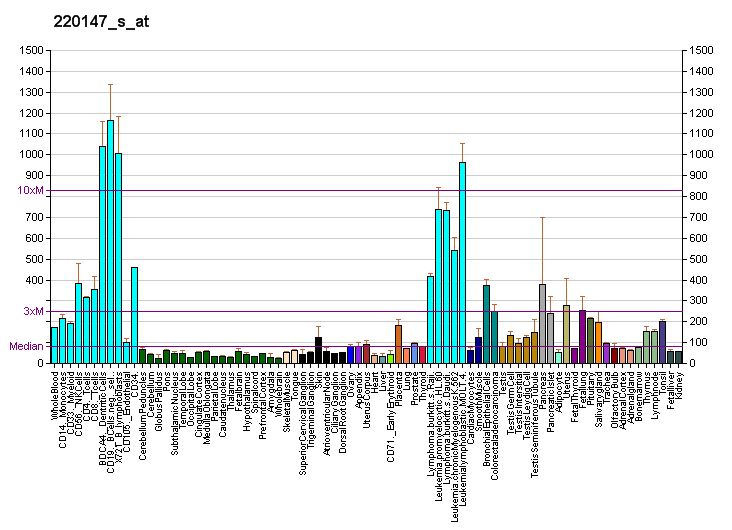
RNA expression pattern
Bgee	Human / Mouse (ortholog); Top expressed in: ventricular zone; ganglionic eminence; endometrium; islet of Langerhans; olfactory zone of nasal mucosa; lymph node; body of uterus; tonsil; rectum; appendix / Top expressed in: genital tubercle; tail of embryo; epiblast; embryo; ventricular zone; ganglionic eminence; embryo; zygote; secondary oocyte; primary oocyte; More reference expression data
BioGPS	More reference expression data
Gene ontology
Molecular function	protein binding
Cellular component	Sin3 complex; nucleus
Biological process	negative regulation of cell migration; positive regulation of cell population proliferation; negative regulation of cell differentiation
Sources:Amigo / QuickGO
Orthologs
Databases	NCBI: entry; OMA: entry
Species	Human	Mouse
Entrez	58516	56306
Ensembl	ENSG00000139146; ENSG00000276371	ENSMUSG00000039985
UniProt	Q9NP50	Q8C8M1
RefSeq (mRNA)	NM_001135811; NM_001135812; NM_021238	NM_019643; NM_001355645; NM_001361398
RefSeq (protein)	NP_001129283; NP_001129284; NP_067061	NP_062617; NP_001342574; NP_001348327
Location (UCSC)	Chr 12: 31.28 – 31.33 Mb	Chr 6: 148.82 – 148.85 Mb
PubMed search
- Wikidata
View/Edit Human	View/Edit Mouse

SIN3-HDAC complex-associated factor is a protein that in humans is encoded by the SINHCAF gene (previously FAM60A). SINHCAF is involved in inhibiting cell migration, and is a subunit of the SIN3-HDAC complex. The expression of SINHCAF is higher in KRAS mutant non-small cell lung cancer.
