= Endonuclease, poly(U) specific =

Protein-coding gene in the species Homo sapiens

ENDOU

Identifiers
- Aliases: ENDOU, P11, PP11, PRSS26, endonuclease, poly(U) specific
- External IDs: OMIM: 606720; MGI: 97746; GeneCards: ENDOU

Gene location (Human)
Chr.	Chromosome 12 (human)
Band	12q13.11	Start	47,709,734 bp
Band	12q13.11	End	47,725,567 bp
RNA expression pattern
Bgee	Human / Mouse (ortholog); Top expressed in: gingival epithelium; oral cavity; epithelium of esophagus; mucosa of pharynx; human penis; body of tongue; skin of abdomen; vulva; skin of arm; skin of leg / Top expressed in: thymus; esophagus; lip; skin of abdomen; skin of external ear; condyle; skin of back; hair follicle; medial dorsal nucleus; umbilical cord; More reference expression data
BioGPS	n/a
Gene ontology
Molecular function	manganese ion binding; polysaccharide binding; metal ion binding; scavenger receptor activity; RNA binding; nuclease activity; endonuclease activity; serine-type peptidase activity; growth factor activity; hydrolase activity; endoribonuclease activity
Cellular component	cytoplasm; plasma membrane; extracellular region; extracellular space
Biological process	nucleic acid phosphodiester bond hydrolysis; female pregnancy; receptor-mediated endocytosis; proteolysis; immune response; RNA phosphodiester bond hydrolysis, endonucleolytic; regulation of signaling receptor activity; vesicle-mediated transport; endocytosis; signal transduction
Sources:Amigo / QuickGO
Orthologs
Databases	NCBI: entry; OMA: entry
Species	Human	Mouse
Entrez	8909	19011
Ensembl	ENSG00000111405	ENSMUSG00000022468
UniProt	P21128	n/a
RefSeq (mRNA)	NM_006025; NM_001172439; NM_001172440	NM_001168693; NM_008902
RefSeq (protein)	NP_001165910; NP_001165911; NP_006016	n/a
Location (UCSC)	Chr 12: 47.71 – 47.73 Mb	n/a
PubMed search
- Wikidata
View/Edit Human	View/Edit Mouse

Endonuclease, poly(U) specific is a protein that in humans is encoded by the ENDOU gene.

== Function ==
This gene encodes a protein with endoribonuclease activity and is expressed in the placenta. The protein may be useful as a tumor marker. Multiple alternatively spliced transcript variants have been found for this protein. [provided by RefSeq, Feb 2010].
