= TMEM117 =

Protein-coding gene in the species Homo sapiens

Identifiers
- Aliases: TMEM117, transmembrane protein 117
- External IDs: MGI: 2444580; HomoloGene: 12992; GeneCards: TMEM117; OMA:TMEM117 - orthologs

Gene location (Human)
Chr.	Chromosome 12 (human)
Band	12q12	Start	43,835,967 bp
Band	12q12	End	44,389,762 bp

Gene location (Mouse)
Chr.	Chromosome 15 (mouse)
Band	15|15 E3	Start	94,527,113 bp
Band	15|15 E3	End	94,993,979 bp
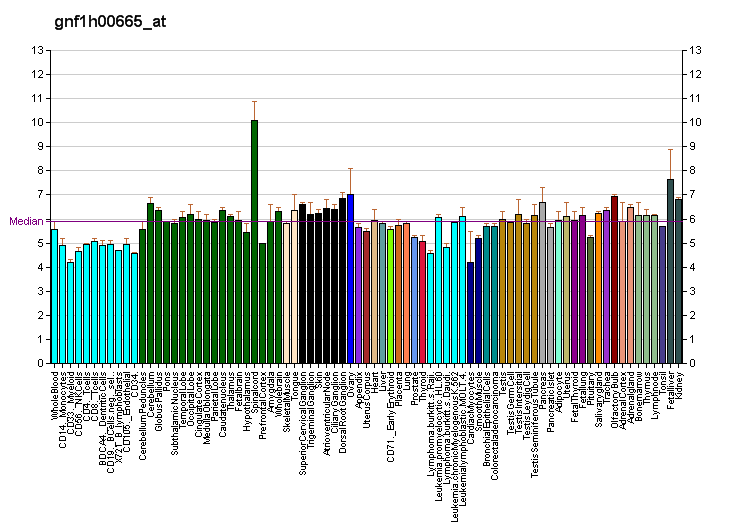

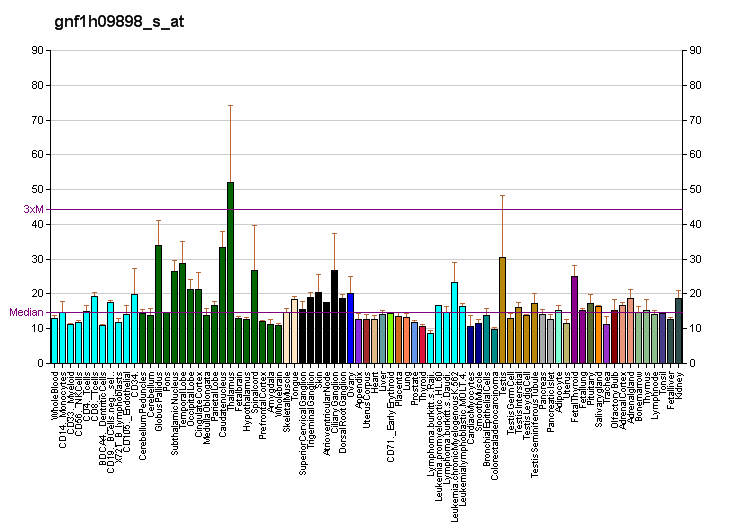
RNA expression pattern
Bgee	Human / Mouse (ortholog); Top expressed in: cardiac muscle tissue of right atrium; myocardium of left ventricle; human penis; skin of arm; pancreatic epithelial cell; trigeminal ganglion; mucosa of paranasal sinus; testicle; spinal ganglia; stromal cell of endometrium / Top expressed in: otolith organ; utricle; vestibular sensory epithelium; olfactory epithelium; zygote; secondary oocyte; stria vascularis; soleus muscle; lacrimal gland; primary oocyte; More reference expression data
BioGPS	More reference expression data
Gene ontology
Molecular function	molecular function
Cellular component	endoplasmic reticulum; integral component of membrane; membrane; plasma membrane
Biological process	intrinsic apoptotic signaling pathway in response to endoplasmic reticulum stress
Sources:Amigo / QuickGO
Orthologs
Species	Human	Mouse
Entrez	84216	320709
Ensembl	ENSG00000139173	ENSMUSG00000063296
UniProt	Q9H0C3	Q8BH18
RefSeq (mRNA)	NM_001286211; NM_001286212; NM_001286213; NM_032256	NM_178789
RefSeq (protein)	NP_001273140; NP_001273141; NP_001273142; NP_115632	NP_848904
Location (UCSC)	Chr 12: 43.84 – 44.39 Mb	Chr 15: 94.53 – 94.99 Mb
PubMed search
- Wikidata
View/Edit Human	View/Edit Mouse

Transmembrane protein 117 is a protein that, in humans, is encoded by the TMEM117 gene.
