= Acrosin binding protein =

Protein-coding gene in humans

ACRBP

Identifiers
- Aliases: ACRBP, CT23, OY-TES-1, SP32, acrosin binding protein
- External IDs: OMIM: 608352; MGI: 1859515; GeneCards: ACRBP

Gene location (Human)
| Chr. | Chromosome 12 (human) |
| Band | 12p13.31 | Start | 6,638,075 bp |
| Band | 12p13.31 | End | 6,647,433 bp |

Gene location (Mouse)
| Chr. | Chromosome 6 (mouse) |
| Band | 6|6 F2 | Start | 125,026,652 bp |
| Band | 6|6 F2 | End | 125,040,230 bp |
RNA expression pattern
| Bgee | Human / Mouse (ortholog); Top expressed in: left testis; right testis; monocyte; sperm; granulocyte; blood; spleen; right lung; gonad; testicle / Top expressed in: superior surface of tongue; gallbladder; seminiferous tubule; spermatid; spermatocyte; saccule; otic placode; otic vesicle; neural layer of retina; granulocyte; More reference expression data |
| BioGPS | n/a |
Gene ontology
| Molecular function | molecular function |
| Cellular component | cytoplasmic vesicle; nucleus; acrosomal vesicle; extracellular region; acrosomal membrane |
| Biological process | sperm capacitation; biological process; acrosome assembly; spermatid development; fertilization |
Sources:Amigo / QuickGO
Orthologs
| Databases | NCBI: entry; OMA: entry |
| Species | Human | Mouse |
| Entrez | 84519 | 54137 |
| Ensembl | ENSG00000111644 | ENSMUSG00000072770 |
| UniProt | Q8NEB7 | Q3V140 |
| RefSeq (mRNA) | NM_032489 | NM_001127340; NM_016845 |
| RefSeq (protein) | NP_115878 | NP_001120812; NP_058541 |
| Location (UCSC) | Chr 12: 6.64 – 6.65 Mb | Chr 6: 125.03 – 125.04 Mb |
| PubMed search |
- Wikidata
| View/Edit Human | View/Edit Mouse |

Acrosin binding protein is a protein that in humans is encoded by the ACRBP gene.

== Function ==
The protein encoded by this gene is similar to proacrosin binding protein sp32 precursor found in mouse, guinea pig, and pig. This protein is located in the sperm acrosome and is thought to function as a binding protein to proacrosin for packaging and condensation of the acrosin zymogen in the acrosomal matrix. This protein is a member of the cancer/testis family of antigens and it is found to be immunogenic. In normal tissues, this mRNA is expressed only in testis, whereas it is detected in a range of different tumor types such as bladder, breast, lung, liver, and colon.
