= TRAFD1 =

Protein-coding gene in the species Homo sapiens

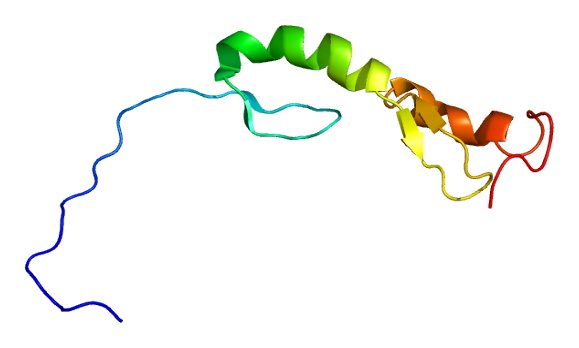

Identifiers
- Aliases: TRAFD1, FLN29, TRAF-type zinc finger domain containing 1
- External IDs: OMIM: 613197; MGI: 1923551; GeneCards: TRAFD1
Available structures
PDB	Ortholog search: PDBe RCSB
PDB	List of PDB id codes 2D9K

Gene location (Human)
Chr.	Chromosome 12 (human)
Band	12q24.13	Start	112,125,538 bp
Band	12q24.13	End	112,153,604 bp

Gene location (Mouse)
Chr.	Chromosome 5 (mouse)
Band	5|5 F	Start	121,509,788 bp
Band	5|5 F	End	121,523,695 bp
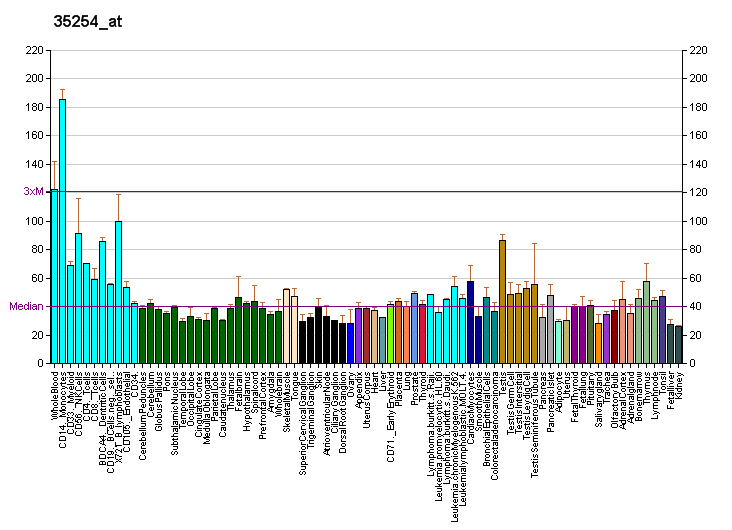

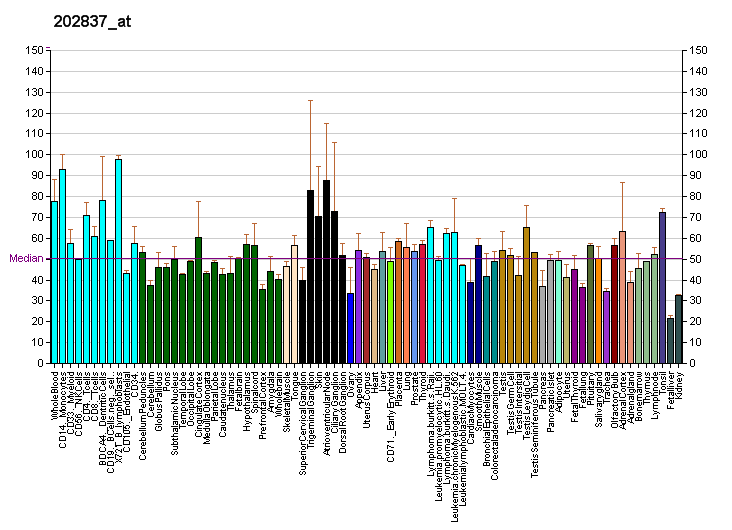
RNA expression pattern
Bgee	Human / Mouse (ortholog); Top expressed in: secondary oocyte; monocyte; granulocyte; Achilles tendon; muscle layer of sigmoid colon; islet of Langerhans; skin of leg; blood; skin of abdomen; ganglionic eminence / Top expressed in: spermatocyte; neural layer of retina; spermatid; zygote; ascending aorta; secondary oocyte; aortic valve; seminiferous tubule; Rostral migratory stream; lens; More reference expression data
BioGPS	More reference expression data
Orthologs
Databases	NCBI: entry; OMA: entry
Species	Human	Mouse
Entrez	10906	231712
Ensembl	ENSG00000135148	ENSMUSG00000042726
UniProt	O14545	Q3UDK1
RefSeq (mRNA)	NM_006700; NM_001143906	NM_001163470; NM_172275; NM_001359947
RefSeq (protein)	NP_001137378; NP_006691	NP_001156942; NP_758479; NP_001346876
Location (UCSC)	Chr 12: 112.13 – 112.15 Mb	Chr 5: 121.51 – 121.52 Mb
PubMed search
- Wikidata
View/Edit Human	View/Edit Mouse

TRAF-type zinc finger domain-containing protein 1 is a protein that in humans is encoded by the TRAFD1 gene.
