= Long intergenic non-protein coding RNA 173 =

Protein found in humans

LINC00173

Identifiers
- Aliases: LINC00173, NCRNA00173, long intergenic non-protein coding RNA 173
- External IDs: GeneCards: LINC00173; OMA:LINC00173 - orthologs

Gene location (Human)
| Chr. | Chromosome 12 (human) |
| Band | 12q24.22 | Start | 116,533,422 bp |
| Band | 12q24.22 | End | 116,536,518 bp |
RNA expression pattern
| Bgee | Human / Mouse (ortholog); Top expressed in: cerebellar hemisphere; right hemisphere of cerebellum; blood; cerebellar vermis; left ovary; right uterine tube; right ovary; body of uterus; left uterine tube; spleen / n/a; More reference expression data |
| BioGPS | n/a |
Orthologs
| Species | Human | Mouse |
| Entrez | 100287569 | n/a |
| Ensembl | ENSG00000196668 | n/a |
| UniProt | n a | n/a |
| RefSeq (mRNA) | NM_207436 | n/a |
| RefSeq (protein) | n/a | n/a |
| Location (UCSC) | Chr 12: 116.53 – 116.54 Mb | n/a |
| PubMed search | | n/a |
- Wikidata
| View/Edit Human |

Long intergenic non-protein coding RNA 173 is a protein that in humans is encoded by the LINC00173 gene.
