= MicroRNA 196a-2 =

MIR196A2

Identifiers
- Aliases: MIR196A2, MIRN196-2, MIRN196A2, mir-196a-2, Microrna 196a-2
- External IDs: OMIM: 609687; GeneCards: MIR196A2; OMA:MIR196A2 - orthologs

Gene location (Human)
Chr.	Chromosome 12 (human)
Band	12q13.13	Start	53,991,738 bp
Band	12q13.13	End	53,991,847 bp
RNA expression pattern
Bgee	Human / Mouse (ortholog); Top expressed in: heart; kidney; blood; colon; monocyte; muscle of leg; stomach; gastrocnemius muscle; tibial arteries; myometrium / n/a; More reference expression data
BioGPS	n/a
Orthologs
Species	Human	Mouse
Entrez	406973	n/a
Ensembl	ENSG00000207924	n/a
UniProt	n a	n/a
RefSeq (mRNA)	n/a	n/a
RefSeq (protein)	n/a	n/a
Location (UCSC)	Chr 12: 53.99 – 53.99 Mb	n/a
PubMed search		n/a
- Wikidata
View/Edit Human

MicroRNA 196a-2 is a MicroRNA that in humans is encoded by the MIR196A2 gene, and is part of the Mir-196 microRNA precursor family.

== Function ==
microRNAs (miRNAs) are short (20-24 nt) non-coding RNAs that are involved in post-transcriptional regulation of gene expression in multicellular organisms by affecting both the stability and translation of mRNAs. miRNAs are transcribed by RNA polymerase II as part of capped and polyadenylated primary transcripts (pri-miRNAs) that can be either protein-coding or non-coding. The primary transcript is cleaved by the Drosha ribonuclease III enzyme to produce an approximately 70-nt stem-loop precursor miRNA (pre-miRNA), which is further cleaved by the cytoplasmic Dicer ribonuclease to generate the mature miRNA and antisense miRNA star (miRNA*) products. The mature miRNA is incorporated into a RNA-induced silencing complex (RISC), which recognizes target mRNAs through imperfect base pairing with the miRNA and most commonly results in translational inhibition or destabilization of the target mRNA. The RefSeq represents the predicted microRNA stem-loop.
