= Ribosomal modification protein rimK-like family member B =

Protein-coding gene in the species Homo sapiens

RIMKLB

Identifiers
- Aliases: RIMKLB, FAM80B, NAAGS, NAAGS-I, ribosomal modification protein rimK-like family member B, ribosomal modification protein rimK like family member B
- External IDs: OMIM: 614054; MGI: 1918325; GeneCards: RIMKLB
Enzyme activity
EC #	BRENDA	ExPASy	KEGG	MetaCyc
6.3.1.17	↗	↗	↗	↗
6.3.2.41	↗	↗	↗	↗

Gene location (Human)
Chr.	Chromosome 12 (human)
Band	12p13.31	Start	8,681,600 bp
Band	12p13.31	End	8,783,095 bp

Gene location (Mouse)
Chr.	Chromosome 6 (mouse)
Band	6|6 F1	Start	122,447,296 bp
Band	6|6 F1	End	122,498,761 bp
RNA expression pattern
Bgee	Human / Mouse (ortholog); Top expressed in: right uterine tube; popliteal artery; tibial arteries; ascending aorta; body of uterus; cerebellar hemisphere; right coronary artery; right hemisphere of cerebellum; Descending thoracic aorta; right testis / Top expressed in: decidua; spermatocyte; spermatid; ventricular zone; ganglionic eminence; genital tubercle; tail of embryo; secondary oocyte; zygote; neural layer of retina; More reference expression data
BioGPS	n/a
Gene ontology
Molecular function	nucleotide binding; ligase activity; ATP binding; citrate-L-glutamate ligase activity; metal ion binding; N-acetyl-L-aspartate-L-glutamate ligase activity
Cellular component	cytoplasm; cytosol
Biological process	cellular amino acid biosynthetic process
Sources:Amigo / QuickGO
Orthologs
Databases	NCBI: entry; OMA: entry
Species	Human	Mouse
Entrez	57494	108653
Ensembl	ENSG00000166532	ENSMUSG00000040649
UniProt	Q9ULI2	Q80WS1
RefSeq (mRNA)	NM_001297776; NM_020734; NM_001352267; NM_001352268; NM_001352269 NM_001352270; NM_001352271	NM_027664
RefSeq (protein)	NP_001284705; NP_065785; NP_001339196; NP_001339197; NP_001339198 NP_001339199; NP_001339200	NP_081940
Location (UCSC)	Chr 12: 8.68 – 8.78 Mb	Chr 6: 122.45 – 122.5 Mb
PubMed search
- Wikidata
View/Edit Human	View/Edit Mouse

Ribosomal modification protein rimK like family member B is a protein that in humans is encoded by the RIMKLB gene.
