= CNPY2 =

Identifiers
- Aliases: CNPY2, HP10390, MSAP, TMEM4, ZSIG9, canopy FGF signaling regulator 2
- External IDs: OMIM: 605861; MGI: 1928477; GeneCards: CNPY2

Gene location (Human)
| Chr. | Chromosome 12 (human) |
| Band | 12q13.3 | Start | 56,309,842 bp |
| Band | 12q13.3 | End | 56,316,119 bp |

Gene location (Mouse)
| Chr. | Chromosome 10 (mouse) |
| Band | 10 D3|10 76.52 cM | Start | 128,158,328 bp |
| Band | 10 D3|10 76.52 cM | End | 128,163,422 bp |
RNA expression pattern
| Bgee | Human / Mouse (ortholog); Top expressed in: anterior pituitary; stromal cell of endometrium; body of pancreas; right lobe of thyroid gland; right adrenal cortex; left adrenal cortex; left lobe of thyroid gland; right lobe of liver; right ovary; mucosa of transverse colon / Top expressed in: medullary collecting duct; fossa; vas deferens; seminal vesicula; condyle; lacrimal gland; efferent ductule; primitive streak; Epithelium of choroid plexus; molar; More reference expression data |
| BioGPS | n/a |
Gene ontology
| Molecular function | protein binding |
| Cellular component | integral component of plasma membrane; endoplasmic reticulum |
| Biological process | negative regulation of gene expression; regulation of low-density lipoprotein particle clearance; tissue development; enzyme linked receptor protein signaling pathway |
Sources:Amigo / QuickGO
Orthologs
| Databases | NCBI: entry; OMA: entry |
| Species | Human | Mouse |
| Entrez | 10330 | 56530 |
| Ensembl | ENSG00000257727 | ENSMUSG00000025381 |
| UniProt | Q9Y2B0 | Q9QXT0 |
| RefSeq (mRNA) | NM_014255; NM_001190991 | NM_019953 |
| RefSeq (protein) | NP_001177920; NP_055070 | NP_064337 |
| Location (UCSC) | Chr 12: 56.31 – 56.32 Mb | Chr 10: 128.16 – 128.16 Mb |
| PubMed search |
- Wikidata
| View/Edit Human | View/Edit Mouse |

Canopy FGF signaling regulator 2 is a protein that in humans is encoded by the CNPY2 gene.
