= MUCL1 =

Protein-coding gene in the species Homo sapiens

Identifiers
- Aliases: MUCL1, SBEM, mucin like 1
- External IDs: OMIM: 610857; HomoloGene: 130916; GeneCards: MUCL1; OMA:MUCL1 - orthologs

Gene location (Human)
Chr.	Chromosome 12 (human)
Band	12q13.2	Start	54,830,518 bp
Band	12q13.2	End	54,896,008 bp
RNA expression pattern
Bgee	Human / Mouse (ortholog); Top expressed in: skin of thigh; parotid gland; skin of hip; lactiferous duct; nipple; skin of abdomen; nasal epithelium; vulva; bronchial epithelial cell; olfactory zone of nasal mucosa / n/a; More reference expression data
BioGPS	n/a
Orthologs
Species	Human	Mouse
Entrez	118430	n/a
Ensembl	ENSG00000172551	n/a
UniProt	Q96DR8	n/a
RefSeq (mRNA)	NM_058173	n/a
RefSeq (protein)	NP_477521	n/a
Location (UCSC)	Chr 12: 54.83 – 54.9 Mb	n/a
PubMed search		n/a
- Wikidata
View/Edit Human

Mucin-like protein 1 is a protein that in humans is encoded by the MUCL1 gene.
