= TCHP =

Protein-coding gene in the species Homo sapiens

Identifiers
- Aliases: TCHP, TpMs, trichoplein keratin filament binding
- External IDs: OMIM: 612654; MGI: 1925082; HomoloGene: 12686; GeneCards: TCHP; OMA:TCHP - orthologs

Gene location (Human)
Chr.	Chromosome 12 (human)
Band	12q24.11	Start	109,900,264 bp
Band	12q24.11	End	109,983,841 bp

Gene location (Mouse)
Chr.	Chromosome 5 (mouse)
Band	5|5 F	Start	114,845,821 bp
Band	5|5 F	End	114,860,388 bp
RNA expression pattern
Bgee	Human / Mouse (ortholog); Top expressed in: sural nerve; pancreatic ductal cell; sperm; mucosa of ileum; right hemisphere of cerebellum; skin of leg; skin of abdomen; endothelial cell; tibialis anterior muscle; apex of heart / Top expressed in: spermatocyte; neural layer of retina; seminiferous tubule; otic vesicle; otolith organ; utricle; ventricular zone; genital tubercle; lens; substantia nigra; More reference expression data
BioGPS	n/a
Gene ontology
Molecular function	protein binding
Cellular component	cytoplasm; ciliary transition fiber; cell junction; centrosome; plasma membrane; apical cortex; desmosome; keratin filament; cytoskeleton; membrane; mitochondrion; cytosol
Biological process	cell projection organization; negative regulation of cell growth; negative regulation of cilium assembly; apoptotic process
Sources:Amigo / QuickGO
Orthologs
Species	Human	Mouse
Entrez	84260	77832
Ensembl	ENSG00000139437	ENSMUSG00000002486
UniProt	Q9BT92	Q3TVW5
RefSeq (mRNA)	NM_001143852; NM_032300	NM_029992
RefSeq (protein)	NP_001137324; NP_115676	NP_084268
Location (UCSC)	Chr 12: 109.9 – 109.98 Mb	Chr 5: 114.85 – 114.86 Mb
PubMed search
- Wikidata
View/Edit Human	View/Edit Mouse

Trichoplein keratin filament-binding protein is a protein that in humans is encoded by the TCHP gene.
