= Zinc finger protein 84 =

Protein found in humans

ZNF84

Identifiers
- Aliases: ZNF84, HPF2, zinc finger protein 84
- External IDs: GeneCards: ZNF84

Gene location (Human)
| Chr. | Chromosome 12 (human) |
| Band | 12q24.33|map from Rosati ref via FISH [AFS] | Start | 133,037,292 bp |
| Band | 12q24.33|map from Rosati ref via FISH [AFS] | End | 133,063,304 bp |
RNA expression pattern
| Bgee | Human / Mouse (ortholog); Top expressed in: ganglionic eminence; Achilles tendon; right uterine tube; ventricular zone; Brodmann area 23; oocyte; middle temporal gyrus; postcentral gyrus; corpus callosum; testicle / n/a; More reference expression data |
| BioGPS | n/a |
Gene ontology
| Molecular function | DNA binding; zinc ion binding; metal ion binding; nucleic acid binding; DNA-binding transcription factor activity, RNA polymerase II-specific |
| Cellular component | intracellular anatomical structure; nucleus |
| Biological process | regulation of transcription, DNA-templated; transcription, DNA-templated; regulation of transcription by RNA polymerase II |
Sources:Amigo / QuickGO
Orthologs
| Databases | NCBI: entry; OMA: entry |
| Species | Human | Mouse |
| Entrez | 7637 | n/a |
| Ensembl | ENSG00000198040 | n/a |
| UniProt | P51523 | n/a |
| RefSeq (mRNA) | NM_001127372; NM_001289971; NM_001289972; NM_003428 | n/a |
| RefSeq (protein) | NP_001120844; NP_001276900; NP_001276901; NP_003419 | n/a |
| Location (UCSC) | Chr 12: 133.04 – 133.06 Mb | n/a |
| PubMed search | | n/a |
- Wikidata
| View/Edit Human |

Zinc finger protein 84 is a protein that in humans is encoded by the ZNF84 gene.
