= LMBR1L =

Protein-coding gene in humans

Identifiers
- Aliases: LMBR1L, LIMR, limb development membrane protein 1 like
- External IDs: OMIM: 610007; MGI: 1289247; HomoloGene: 10011; GeneCards: LMBR1L; OMA:LMBR1L - orthologs

Gene location (Human)
| Chr. | Chromosome 12 (human) |
| Band | 12q13.12 | Start | 49,097,136 bp |
| Band | 12q13.12 | End | 49,110,900 bp |

Gene location (Mouse)
| Chr. | Chromosome 15 (mouse) |
| Band | 15 F1|15 55.1 cM | Start | 98,801,798 bp |
| Band | 15 F1|15 55.1 cM | End | 98,816,112 bp |
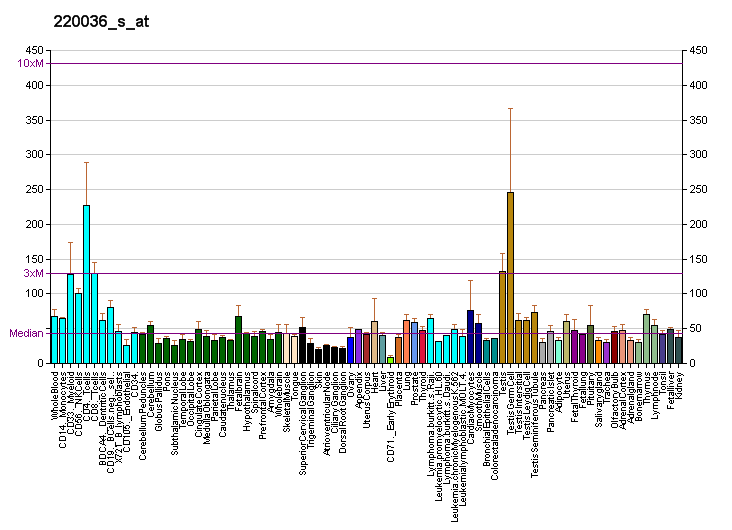
RNA expression pattern
| Bgee | Human / Mouse (ortholog); Top expressed in: right testis; left testis; right uterine tube; anterior pituitary; left ovary; gastric mucosa; body of uterus; tibial nerve; right hemisphere of cerebellum; right ovary / Top expressed in: neural layer of retina; granulocyte; spermatid; spermatocyte; lip; yolk sac; seminiferous tubule; thymus; ventricular zone; tail of embryo; More reference expression data |
| BioGPS | More reference expression data |
Gene ontology
| Molecular function | protein binding; transmembrane signaling receptor activity |
| Cellular component | membrane; integral component of membrane; plasma membrane; integral component of plasma membrane |
| Biological process | endocytosis; receptor-mediated endocytosis; signal transduction |
Sources:Amigo / QuickGO
Orthologs
| Species | Human | Mouse |
| Entrez | 55716 | 74775 |
| Ensembl | ENSG00000139636 | ENSMUSG00000022999 |
| UniProt | Q6UX01 | Q9D1E5 |
| RefSeq (mRNA) | NM_001300750; NM_001300751; NM_018113; NM_001352161; NM_001352162 NM_001352163; NM_001352164; NM_001352165; NM_001352166; NM_001352167; NM_001352168 | NM_029098 |
| RefSeq (protein) | NP_001287679; NP_001287680; NP_060583; NP_001339090; NP_001339091 NP_001339092; NP_001339093; NP_001339094; NP_001339095; NP_001339096; NP_001339097 | NP_083374 |
| Location (UCSC) | Chr 12: 49.1 – 49.11 Mb | Chr 15: 98.8 – 98.82 Mb |
| PubMed search |
- Wikidata
| View/Edit Human | View/Edit Mouse |

Protein LMBR1L is a protein that in humans is encoded by the LMBR1L gene.
