= DNAI7 =

Protein found in humans

Identifiers
- Aliases: DNAI7, LAS1, PPP1R54, cancer susceptibility candidate 1, cancer susceptibility 1, cilia and flagella associated protein 94, CASC1, dynein axonemal intermediate chain 7, CFAP94
- External IDs: OMIM: 616906; MGI: 2444480; GeneCards: DNAI7

Gene location (Human)
| Chr. | Chromosome 12 (human) |
| Band | 12p12.1 | Start | 25,108,289 bp |
| Band | 12p12.1 | End | 25,195,162 bp |

Gene location (Mouse)
| Chr. | Chromosome 6 (mouse) |
| Band | 6 G3|6 77.37 cM | Start | 145,120,560 bp |
| Band | 6 G3|6 77.37 cM | End | 145,156,731 bp |
RNA expression pattern
| Bgee | Human / Mouse (ortholog); Top expressed in: sperm; bronchial epithelial cell; right uterine tube; olfactory zone of nasal mucosa; testicle; buccal mucosa cell; mucosa of paranasal sinus; left testis; right testis; Epithelium of choroid plexus / Top expressed in: zygote; secondary oocyte; primary oocyte; spermatid; spermatocyte; testicle; ovary; hypothalamus; granulocyte; embryo; More reference expression data |
| BioGPS | n/a |
Orthologs
| Databases | NCBI: entry; OMA: entry |
| Species | Human | Mouse |
| Entrez | 55259 | 320662 |
| Ensembl | ENSG00000118307 | ENSMUSG00000043541 |
| UniProt | Q6TDU7 | Q6TDU8 |
| RefSeq (mRNA) | NM_001082972; NM_001082973; NM_001204101; NM_001204102; NM_018272 NM_001319977; NM_001319978; NM_001352061; NM_001352062; NM_001352063; NM_001352064; NM_001352065; NM_001352066; NM_001352067; NM_001352068 | NM_177222 |
| RefSeq (protein) | NP_001076441; NP_001076442; NP_001191030; NP_001191031; NP_001306906 NP_001306907; NP_060742; NP_001338990; NP_001338991; NP_001338992; NP_001338993; NP_001338994; NP_001338995; NP_001338996; NP_001338997 | NP_796196 |
| Location (UCSC) | Chr 12: 25.11 – 25.2 Mb | Chr 6: 145.12 – 145.16 Mb |
| PubMed search |
- Wikidata
| View/Edit Human | View/Edit Mouse |

Dynein axonemal intermediate chain 7 is a protein that in humans is encoded by the DNAI7 gene, also sometimes known as LAS1; CASC1; CFAP94; or PPP1R54. The protein is sometimes referred to as cancer susceptibility 1.

Casc1, alias Las1, is one of the six genes constituting the mouse Pulmonary adenoma susceptibility 1 (Pas1) locus haplotype.
