= GPN-loop GTPase 3 =

Protein-coding gene in the species Homo sapiens

GPN3

Identifiers
- Aliases: GPN3, ATPBD1C, GPN-loop GTPase 3
- External IDs: MGI: 1289326; GeneCards: GPN3

Gene location (Human)
Chr.	Chromosome 12 (human)
Band	12q24.11	Start	110,452,486 bp
Band	12q24.11	End	110,469,268 bp

Gene location (Mouse)
Chr.	Chromosome 5 (mouse)
Band	5 F|5 62.33 cM	Start	122,509,939 bp
Band	5 F|5 62.33 cM	End	122,520,965 bp
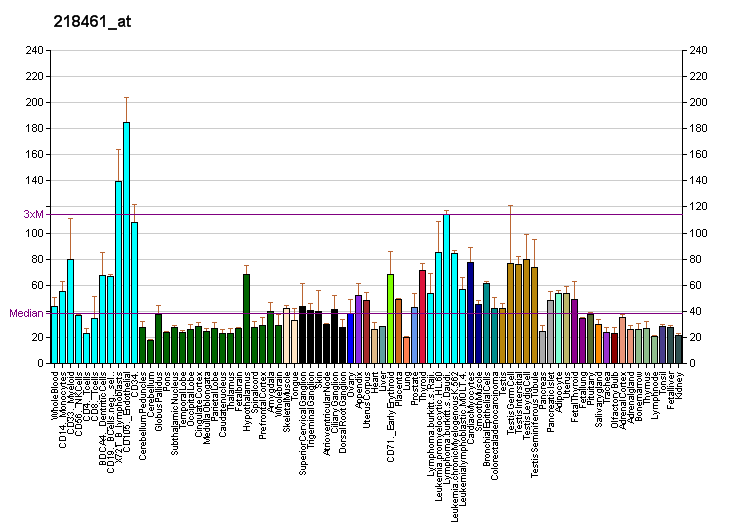
RNA expression pattern
Bgee	Human / Mouse (ortholog); Top expressed in: Skeletal muscle tissue of biceps brachii; vastus lateralis muscle; right ventricle; gastrocnemius muscle; kidney tubule; muscle of thigh; deltoid muscle; glomerulus; right testis; metanephric glomerulus / Top expressed in: morula; tail of embryo; blastocyst; yolk sac; spermatocyte; genital tubercle; embryo; embryo; epiblast; neural layer of retina; More reference expression data
BioGPS	More reference expression data
Orthologs
Databases	NCBI: entry; OMA: entry
Species	Human	Mouse
Entrez	51184	68080
Ensembl	ENSG00000111231	ENSMUSG00000029464
UniProt	Q9UHW5	Q9D3W4
RefSeq (mRNA)	NM_001164372; NM_001164373; NM_016301	NM_024216
RefSeq (protein)	NP_001157844; NP_001157845; NP_057385	NP_077178
Location (UCSC)	Chr 12: 110.45 – 110.47 Mb	Chr 5: 122.51 – 122.52 Mb
PubMed search
- Wikidata
View/Edit Human	View/Edit Mouse

GPN-loop GTPase 3 is an enzyme that in humans is encoded by the GPN3 gene.
