= C12orf43 =

Protein-coding gene in humans

Identifiers
- Aliases: C12orf43, chromosome 12 open reading frame 43, Custos
- External IDs: MGI: 1919607; HomoloGene: 11285; GeneCards: C12orf43; OMA:C12orf43 - orthologs

Gene location (Human)
| Chr. | Chromosome 12 (human) |
| Band | 12q24.31 | Start | 121,000,486 bp |
| Band | 12q24.31 | End | 121,016,502 bp |

Gene location (Mouse)
| Chr. | Chromosome 5 (mouse) |
| Band | 5|5 F | Start | 115,080,217 bp |
| Band | 5|5 F | End | 115,087,842 bp |
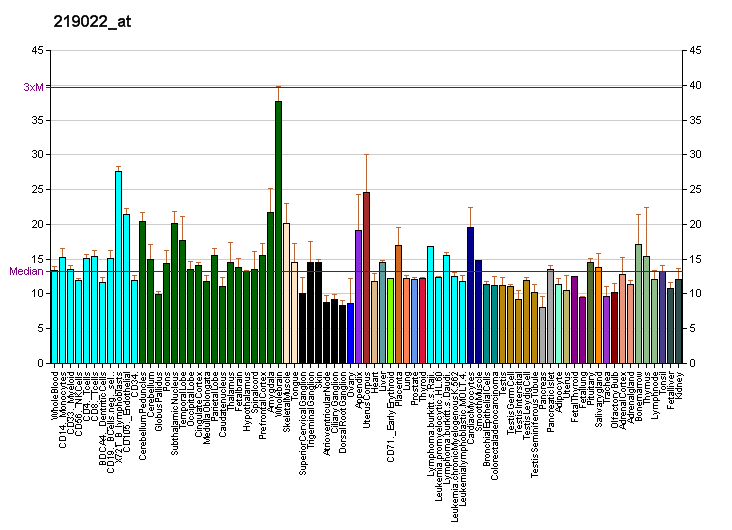
RNA expression pattern
| Bgee | Human / Mouse (ortholog); Top expressed in: secondary oocyte; prefrontal cortex; gonad; right frontal lobe; testicle; sural nerve; anterior cingulate cortex; dorsolateral prefrontal cortex; Brodmann area 9; granulocyte / Top expressed in: primary visual cortex; superior frontal gyrus; dentate gyrus of hippocampal formation granule cell; supraoptic nucleus; right kidney; cerebellar cortex; hippocampus proper; neural tube; dorsomedial hypothalamic nucleus; yolk sac; More reference expression data |
| BioGPS | More reference expression data |
Gene ontology
| Molecular function | protein binding |
| Cellular component | nuclear envelope; nucleus |
| Biological process | negative regulation of Wnt signaling pathway; multicellular organism development; Wnt signaling pathway; anterior head development; Spemann organizer formation |
Sources:Amigo / QuickGO
Orthologs
| Species | Human | Mouse |
| Entrez | 64897 | 72357 |
| Ensembl | ENSG00000157895 | ENSMUSG00000029559 |
| UniProt | Q96C57 | Q3UY34 |
| RefSeq (mRNA) | NM_001286191; NM_001286192; NM_001286195; NM_001286196; NM_001286197 NM_001286198; NM_022895 | NM_028211 |
| RefSeq (protein) | NP_001273120; NP_001273121; NP_001273124; NP_001273125; NP_001273126 NP_001273127; NP_075046 | NP_082487 |
| Location (UCSC) | Chr 12: 121 – 121.02 Mb | Chr 5: 115.08 – 115.09 Mb |
| PubMed search |
- Wikidata
| View/Edit Human | View/Edit Mouse |

Uncharacterized protein C12orf43 is a protein that in humans is encoded by the C12orf43 gene.
