= RASSF8 =

Protein-coding gene in the species Homo sapiens

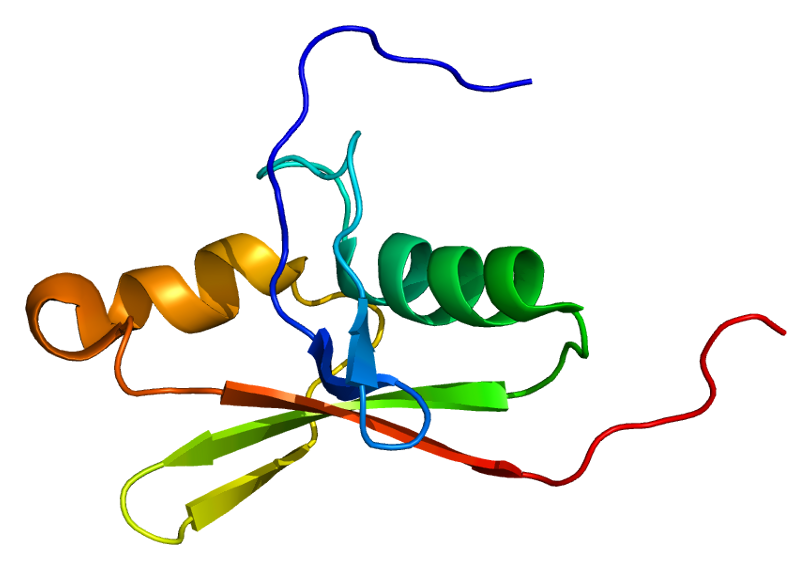

Identifiers
- Aliases: RASSF8, C12orf2, HOJ1, Ras association domain family member 8
- External IDs: OMIM: 608231; MGI: 1918573; GeneCards: RASSF8
Available structures
PDB	Ortholog search: PDBe RCSB
PDB	List of PDB id codes 2CS4

Gene location (Human)
Chr.	Chromosome 12 (human)
Band	12p12.1	Start	25,959,029 bp
Band	12p12.1	End	26,079,892 bp

Gene location (Mouse)
Chr.	Chromosome 6 (mouse)
Band	6|6 G3	Start	145,692,474 bp
Band	6|6 G3	End	145,766,805 bp
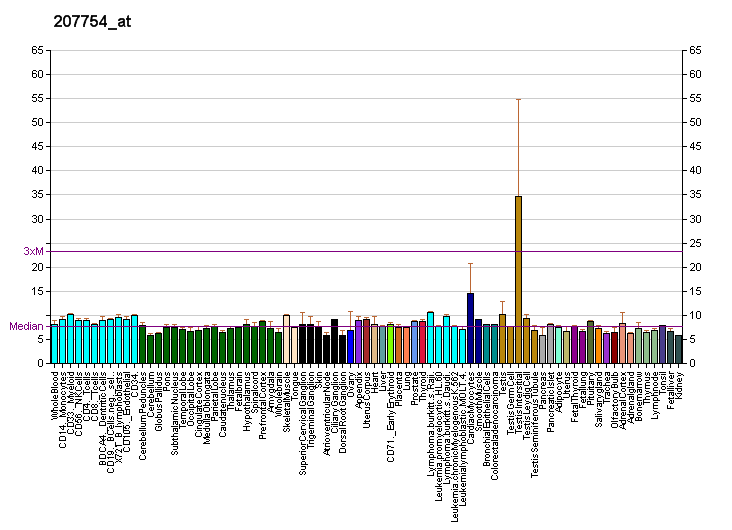
RNA expression pattern
Bgee	Human / Mouse (ortholog); Top expressed in: sperm; Achilles tendon; stromal cell of endometrium; left testis; right testis; retinal pigment epithelium; epithelium of colon; sural nerve; Skeletal muscle tissue of rectus abdominis; secondary oocyte / Top expressed in: gastrula; ciliary body; iris; decidua; pineal gland; vas deferens; Epithelium of choroid plexus; neural layer of retina; stria vascularis; efferent ductule; More reference expression data
BioGPS	More reference expression data
Orthologs
Databases	NCBI: entry; OMA: entry
Species	Human	Mouse
Entrez	11228	71323
Ensembl	ENSG00000123094	ENSMUSG00000030259
UniProt	Q8NHQ8	Q8CJ96
RefSeq (mRNA)	NM_001164746; NM_001164747; NM_001164748; NM_007211	NM_027760
RefSeq (protein)	NP_001158218; NP_001158219; NP_001158220; NP_009142	NP_082036
Location (UCSC)	Chr 12: 25.96 – 26.08 Mb	Chr 6: 145.69 – 145.77 Mb
PubMed search
- Wikidata
View/Edit Human	View/Edit Mouse

Ras association domain-containing protein 8 is a protein that in humans is encoded by the RASSF8 gene.
