= IFNG-AS1 =

Identifiers
- Aliases: IFNG-AS1, GS1-410F4.2, Tmevpg1, NEST, IFNG antisense RNA 1
- External IDs: GeneCards: IFNG-AS1

Gene location (Human)
Chr.	Chromosome 12 (human)
Band	12q15	Start	67,989,445 bp
Band	12q15	End	68,234,686 bp
RNA expression pattern
Bgee	Human / Mouse (ortholog); Top expressed in: bone marrow cell; testicle; lymph node; epithelium of colon; tonsil; appendix; sural nerve; granulocyte; urinary bladder; skeletal muscle tissue / n/a; More reference expression data
BioGPS	n/a
Orthologs
Databases	NCBI: entry; OMA: entry
Species	Human	Mouse
Entrez	100885789	n/a
Ensembl	ENSG00000255733	n/a
UniProt	n a	n/a
RefSeq (mRNA)	n/a	n/a
RefSeq (protein)	n/a	n/a
Location (UCSC)	Chr 12: 67.99 – 68.23 Mb	n/a
PubMed search		n/a
- Wikidata
View/Edit Human

IFNG antisense RNA 1 is a long non-coding RNA that in humans is encoded by the IFNG-AS1 gene. It is a positive regulator of interferon gamma in T and NK cells.

IFNG-AS1 (Tmevpg1, NeST) is encoded by a gene near the Ifng locus. Some studies have shown that IFNG-AS1 expression is dependent on T-bet. In fact, transcription of IFNG-AS1 is regulated by T-bet. The upregulation of this LncRNA could enhance the production of IFN-γ from Th1 cells by cooperation of T-bet. In the other hand, in human genomic region, there are some preserved DNase 1 hypersensitivity sites (HS) between Ifng and IFNG-AS1 which induce transcription factors such as NF-κB and ETS proto-oncogene 1 (Ets-1). T-bet could control chromatin remodeling through recruiting These HS. These hypersensitivity sites have transcriptional enhancer activity to enhance or repress transcription of either IFNG or IFNG-AS1. T-bet through this epigenetic mechanism could affect on expression of IFNG-AS1. Also IFNG-AS1 with binding to WD repeat domain 5 (WDR5), stimulates the formation of histone H3 lysine 4 (H3K4) methylation at the IFNG gene and affect on the enhancement of this gene expression. Also, the effective role of IFNG-AS1 in many protective actions, including enhancing the expression of IFN-γ in the immune response in brucellosis patients, suggest a new molecular interaction response to brucella infection.
