= PLBD1 =

Protein-coding gene in the species Homo sapiens

Identifiers
- Aliases: PLBD1, phospholipase B domain containing 1
- External IDs: OMIM: 618486; MGI: 1914107; GeneCards: PLBD1

Gene location (Human)
Chr.	Chromosome 12 (human)
Band	12p13.1	Start	14,503,661 bp
Band	12p13.1	End	14,567,883 bp

Gene location (Mouse)
Chr.	Chromosome 6 (mouse)
Band	6|6 G1	Start	136,589,068 bp
Band	6|6 G1	End	136,638,926 bp
RNA expression pattern
Bgee	Human / Mouse (ortholog); Top expressed in: monocyte; trabecular bone; bone marrow; blood; granulocyte; bone marrow cell; rectum; gingival epithelium; periodontal fiber; oral cavity / Top expressed in: granulocyte; tibiofemoral joint; spleen; brown adipose tissue; mesenteric lymph nodes; left colon; epidermis; hair follicle; lip; digastric muscle; More reference expression data
BioGPS	n/a
Gene ontology
Molecular function	hydrolase activity; phospholipase A2 activity; lysophospholipase activity; phospholipase activity
Cellular component	cytosol; lysosome; extracellular space
Biological process	lipid catabolic process; phospholipid metabolic process; phosphatidylinositol acyl-chain remodeling; phosphatidylethanolamine acyl-chain remodeling; phosphatidylcholine acyl-chain remodeling; lipid metabolism
Sources:Amigo / QuickGO
Orthologs
Databases	NCBI: entry; OMA: entry
Species	Human	Mouse
Entrez	79887	66857
Ensembl	ENSG00000121316	ENSMUSG00000030214
UniProt	Q6P4A8	Q8VCI0
RefSeq (mRNA)	NM_024829	NM_025806
RefSeq (protein)	NP_079105	NP_080082
Location (UCSC)	Chr 12: 14.5 – 14.57 Mb	Chr 6: 136.59 – 136.64 Mb
PubMed search
- Wikidata
View/Edit Human	View/Edit Mouse

Phospholipase B domain containing 1 is a protein that in humans is encoded by the PLBD1 gene.
