= NUDT4 =

Protein-coding gene in the species Homo sapiens

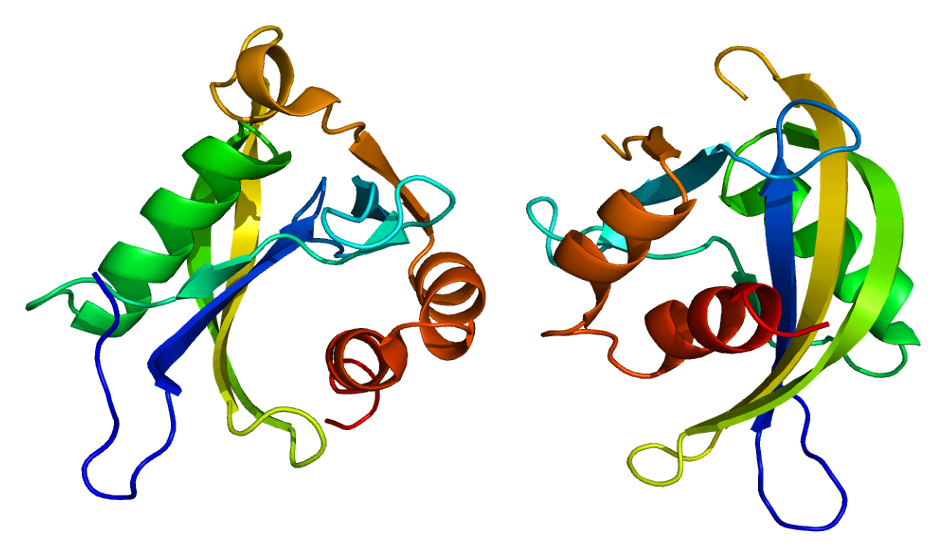
Available structures
| PDB | Ortholog search: PDBe RCSB |
| PDB | List of PDB id codes 2DUK |

Identifiers
- Aliases: NUDT4, DIPP2, DIPP2alpha, DIPP2beta, HDCMB47P, nudix hydrolase 4, DIPP-2B, NUDT4B
- External IDs: OMIM: 609229; MGI: 1918457; HomoloGene: 41726; GeneCards: NUDT4; OMA:NUDT4 - orthologs

Gene location (Human)
| Chr. | Chromosome 12 (human) |
| Band | 12q22 | Start | 93,377,883 bp |
| Band | 12q22 | End | 93,408,146 bp |

Gene location (Mouse)
| Chr. | Chromosome 10 (mouse) |
| Band | 10|10 C2 | Start | 95,382,869 bp |
| Band | 10|10 C2 | End | 95,400,008 bp |
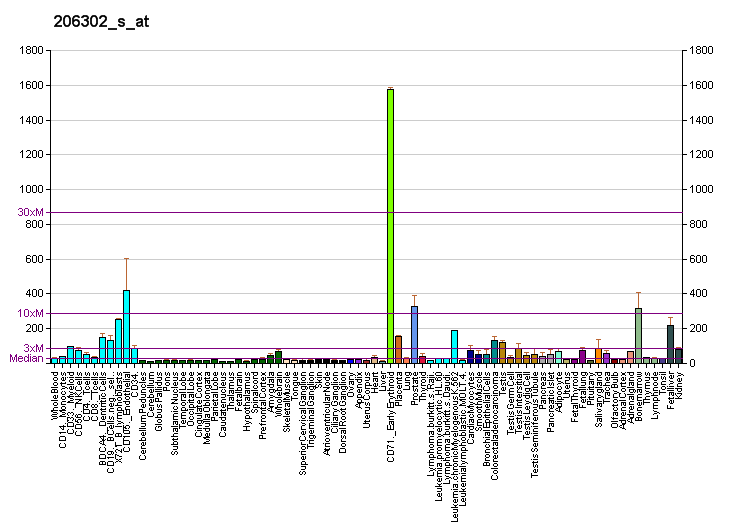

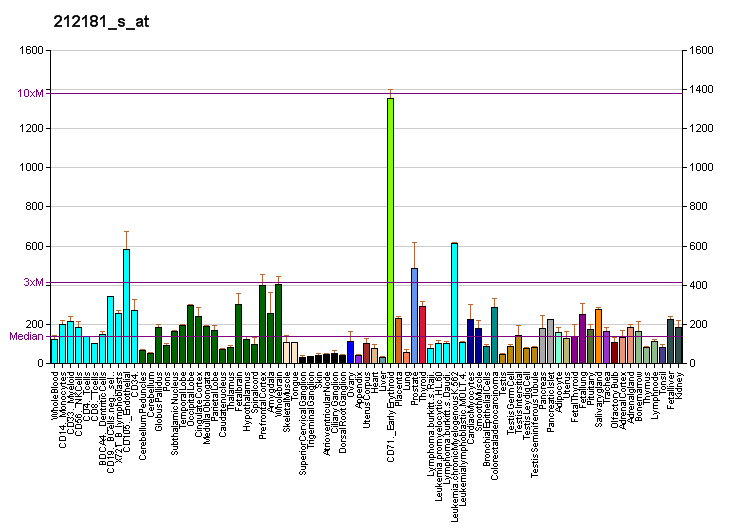

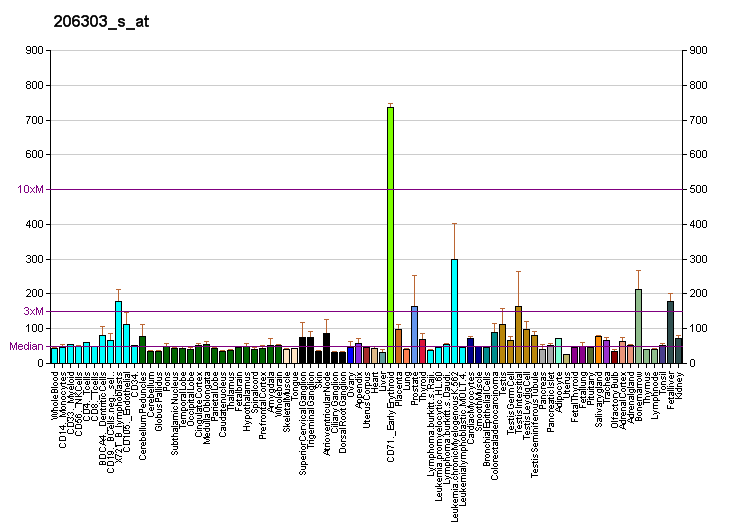
RNA expression pattern
| Bgee | Human / Mouse (ortholog); Top expressed in: right ventricle; parotid gland; myocardium of left ventricle; renal medulla; caput epididymis; corpus epididymis; cardiac muscle tissue of right atrium; gallbladder; trabecular bone; mucosa of sigmoid colon / Top expressed in: molar; ciliary body; endocardial cushion; submandibular gland; left colon; granulocyte; seminiferous tubule; atrium; quadriceps femoris muscle; knee joint; More reference expression data |
| BioGPS | More reference expression data |
Gene ontology
| Molecular function | inositol diphosphate tetrakisphosphate diphosphatase activity; inositol-1-diphosphate-2,3,4,5,6-pentakisphosphate diphosphatase activity; inositol-3,5-bisdiphosphate-2,3,4,6-tetrakisphosphate 5-diphosphatase activity; inositol-5-diphosphate-1,2,3,4,6-pentakisphosphate diphosphatase activity; metal ion binding; protein binding; RNA binding; inositol-3-diphosphate-1,2,4,5,6-pentakisphosphate diphosphatase activity; hydrolase activity; diphosphoinositol-polyphosphate diphosphatase activity; inositol-1,5-bisdiphosphate-2,3,4,6-tetrakisphosphate 1-diphosphatase activity; inositol-1,5-bisdiphosphate-2,3,4,6-tetrakisphosphate 5-diphosphatase activity; inositol diphosphate pentakisphosphate diphosphatase activity; inositol bisdiphosphate tetrakisphosphate diphosphatase activity; endopolyphosphatase activity; bis(5'-adenosyl)-hexaphosphatase activity; bis(5'-adenosyl)-pentaphosphatase activity; m7G(5')pppN diphosphatase activity; snoRNA binding |
| Cellular component | intracellular anatomical structure; nucleus; cytoplasm; cytosol |
| Biological process | intracellular signal transduction; cyclic nucleotide metabolic process; inositol phosphate metabolic process; cyclic-nucleotide-mediated signaling; calcium-mediated signaling; diphosphoinositol polyphosphate metabolic process; diadenosine pentaphosphate catabolic process; diadenosine hexaphosphate catabolic process; adenosine 5'-(hexahydrogen pentaphosphate) catabolic process |
Sources:Amigo / QuickGO
Orthologs
| Species | Human | Mouse |
| Entrez | 11163 | 71207 |
| Ensembl | ENSG00000173598 | ENSMUSG00000020029 |
| UniProt | Q9NZJ9 | Q8R2U6 |
| RefSeq (mRNA) | NM_001301022; NM_001301023; NM_001301024; NM_019094; NM_199040 | NM_027722; NM_001358996 |
| RefSeq (protein) | NP_001287951; NP_001287952; NP_001287953; NP_061967; NP_950241 | NP_081998; NP_001345925 |
| Location (UCSC) | Chr 12: 93.38 – 93.41 Mb | Chr 10: 95.38 – 95.4 Mb |
| PubMed search |
- Wikidata
| View/Edit Human | View/Edit Mouse |

Diphosphoinositol polyphosphate phosphohydrolase 2 is an enzyme that in humans is encoded by the NUDT4 gene.

The protein encoded by this gene regulates the turnover of diphosphoinositol polyphosphates. The turnover of these high-energy diphosphoinositol polyphosphates represents a molecular switching activity with important regulatory consequences. Molecular switching by diphosphoinositol polyphosphates may contribute to regulating intracellular trafficking. Several alternatively spliced transcript variants have been described, but the full-length nature of some variants has not been determined. Isoforms DIPP2alpha and DIPP2beta are distinguishable from each other solely by DIPP2beta possessing one additional amino acid due to intron boundary skidding in alternate splicing.
