= YAF2 =

Protein-coding gene in the species Homo sapiens

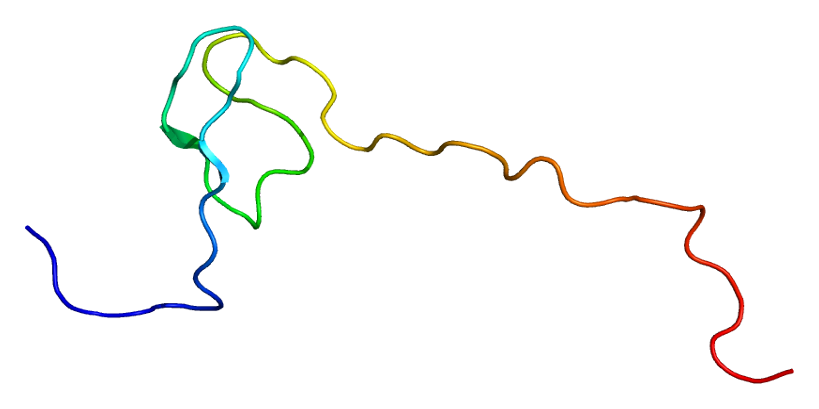
Available structures
PDB	Ortholog search: PDBe RCSB
PDB	List of PDB id codes 2D9G

Identifiers
- Aliases: YAF2, YY1 associated factor 2
- External IDs: OMIM: 607534; MGI: 1914307; HomoloGene: 136401; GeneCards: YAF2; OMA:YAF2 - orthologs

Gene location (Human)
Chr.	Chromosome 12 (human)
Band	12q12	Start	42,157,104 bp
Band	12q12	End	42,238,349 bp

Gene location (Mouse)
Chr.	Chromosome 15 (mouse)
Band	15|15 E3	Start	93,182,159 bp
Band	15|15 E3	End	93,234,816 bp
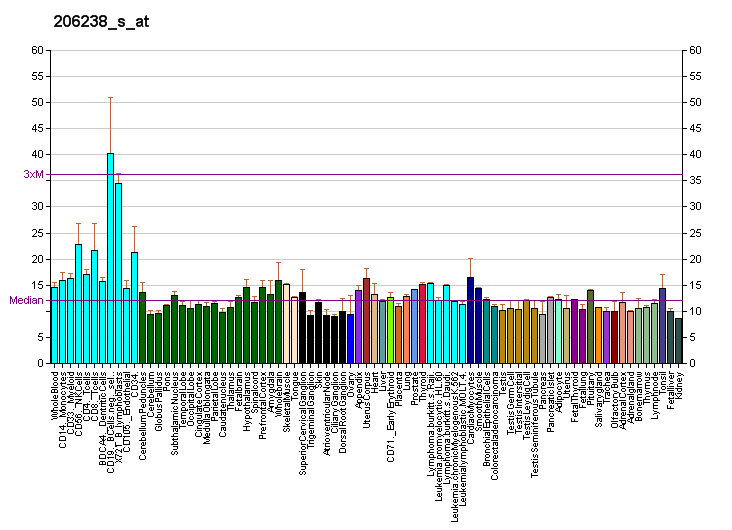
RNA expression pattern
Bgee	Human / Mouse (ortholog); Top expressed in: right auricle of heart; Achilles tendon; gastrocnemius muscle; epithelium of colon; left ventricle; muscle of thigh; ventricular zone; sural nerve; ganglionic eminence; gonad / Top expressed in: Region I of hippocampus proper; barrel cortex; epithelium of lens; retinal pigment epithelium; substantia nigra; Epithelium of choroid plexus; iris; prefrontal cortex; blood; external carotid artery; More reference expression data
BioGPS	More reference expression data
Gene ontology
Molecular function	protein binding; metal ion binding; transcription coactivator activity; transcription corepressor activity
Cellular component	nucleus; cytosol; nucleoplasm
Biological process	positive regulation of transcription, DNA-templated; negative regulation of transcription, DNA-templated; regulation of transcription, DNA-templated; transcription, DNA-templated; negative regulation of G0 to G1 transition
Sources:Amigo / QuickGO
Orthologs
Species	Human	Mouse
Entrez	10138	67057
Ensembl	ENSG00000015153	ENSMUSG00000022634
UniProt	Q8IY57	Q99LW6
RefSeq (mRNA)	NM_001012424; NM_001190977; NM_001190979; NM_001190980; NM_005748 NM_001320080	NM_024189
RefSeq (protein)	NP_001177906; NP_001177908; NP_001177909; NP_001307009; NP_005739	NP_077151
Location (UCSC)	Chr 12: 42.16 – 42.24 Mb	Chr 15: 93.18 – 93.23 Mb
PubMed search
- Wikidata
View/Edit Human	View/Edit Mouse

YY1-associated factor 2 is a protein that in humans is encoded by the YAF2 gene.

The protein encoded by this gene interacts with YY1, a zinc finger protein involved in negative regulation of muscle-restricted genes. This gene product itself contains a single N-terminal C2-X10-C2 zinc finger, and in contrast to YY1, is up-regulated during myogenic differentiation. It also facilitates proteolytic cleavage of YY1 by the calcium- activated protease, m-calpain, suggesting a mechanism by which this protein antagonizes the negative effect of YY1.
