= Serpina3f =

Identifiers
- Aliases: 2A1BC049975serine (or cysteine) peptidase inhibitorclade Amember 3F
- External IDs: HomoloGene: 115927; GeneCards: ; OMA:- orthologs

Gene location (Human)
Chr.	Chromosome 12 (human)
Band	12|12 E	Start	104,180,803 bp
Band	12|12 E	End	104,187,388 bp
RNA expression pattern
Bgee	Human / Mouse (ortholog); Top expressed in: spleen; dentate gyrus of hippocampal formation granule cell; bone marrow; ileum; jejunum; liver; lung; thymus; granulocyte; zone of skin / n/a; More reference expression data
BioGPS	n/a
Gene ontology
Molecular function	peptidase inhibitor activity; serine-type endopeptidase inhibitor activity
Cellular component	extracellular space
Biological process	response to cytokine; negative regulation of peptidase activity; response to peptide hormone; negative regulation of endopeptidase activity; response to bacterium
Sources:Amigo / QuickGO
Orthologs
Species	Human	Mouse
Entrez	238393	n/a
Ensembl	ENSMUSG00000066363	n/a
UniProt	Q80X76	n/a
RefSeq (mRNA)	NM_001033335; NM_001168294; NM_001168295	n/a
RefSeq (protein)	NP_001028507; NP_001161766; NP_001161767	n/a
Location (UCSC)	Chr 12: 104.18 – 104.19 Mb	n/a
PubMed search		n/a
- Wikidata
View/Edit Human

Serine (or cysteine) peptidase inhibitor, clade A, member 3F is a protein that in the mouse is encoded by the Serpina3f gene.
