= RNF34 =

Protein-coding gene in the species Homo sapiens

Identifiers
- Aliases: RNF34, CARP-1, CARP1, RFI, RIF, RIFF, hRFI, ring finger protein 34
- External IDs: OMIM: 608299; MGI: 2153340; GeneCards: RNF34
Enzyme activity
EC #	BRENDA	ExPASy	KEGG	MetaCyc
2.3.2.27	↗	↗	↗	↗

Gene location (Human)
Chr.	Chromosome 12 (human)
Band	12q24.31	Start	121,400,083 bp
Band	12q24.31	End	121,430,623 bp

Gene location (Mouse)
Chr.	Chromosome 5 (mouse)
Band	5|5 F	Start	122,988,111 bp
Band	5|5 F	End	123,009,354 bp
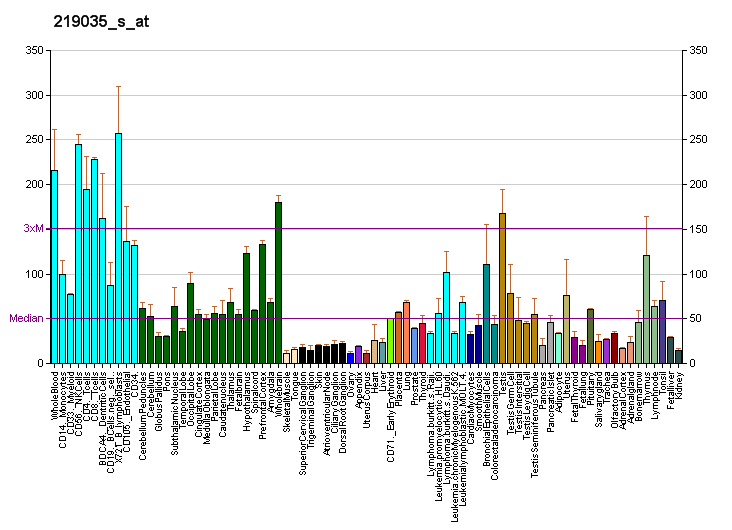
RNA expression pattern
Bgee	Human / Mouse (ortholog); Top expressed in: secondary oocyte; Skeletal muscle tissue of rectus abdominis; Skeletal muscle tissue of biceps brachii; triceps brachii muscle; glutes; ganglionic eminence; muscle of thigh; gonad; middle temporal gyrus; Brodmann area 23 / Top expressed in: zygote; secondary oocyte; primary oocyte; tail of embryo; right ventricle; medial ganglionic eminence; genital tubercle; spermatid; granulocyte; temporal muscle; More reference expression data
BioGPS	More reference expression data
Gene ontology
Molecular function	metal ion binding; phosphatidylinositol phosphate binding; p53 binding; ubiquitin protein ligase binding; protein binding; ubiquitin protein ligase activity; ubiquitin-protein transferase activity; transferase activity
Cellular component	cytoplasm; endomembrane system; nucleus; membrane; plasma membrane; nuclear speck; nucleoplasm; cytosol; nuclear body
Biological process	negative regulation of signal transduction by p53 class mediator; negative regulation of extrinsic apoptotic signaling pathway via death domain receptors; nucleotide-binding domain, leucine rich repeat containing receptor signaling pathway; protein K48-linked ubiquitination; negative regulation of cysteine-type endopeptidase activity involved in execution phase of apoptosis; apoptotic process; regulation of oxygen metabolic process; cellular response to cold; protein ubiquitination; proteasome-mediated ubiquitin-dependent protein catabolic process; ubiquitin-dependent protein catabolic process
Sources:Amigo / QuickGO
Orthologs
Databases	NCBI: entry; OMA: entry
Species	Human	Mouse
Entrez	80196	80751
Ensembl	ENSG00000170633	ENSMUSG00000029474
UniProt	Q969K3	Q99KR6
RefSeq (mRNA)	NM_194271; NM_001256858; NM_025126; NM_001394208	NM_030564
RefSeq (protein)	NP_001243787; NP_079402; NP_919247	NP_085041
Location (UCSC)	Chr 12: 121.4 – 121.43 Mb	Chr 5: 122.99 – 123.01 Mb
PubMed search
- Wikidata
View/Edit Human	View/Edit Mouse

E3 ubiquitin-protein ligase RNF34 is an enzyme that in humans is encoded by the RNF34 gene.

The protein encoded by this gene contains a RINF finger, a motif known to be involved in protein-protein and protein-DNA interactions. This protein interacts with DNAJA3/hTid-1, which is a DnaJ protein reported to function as a modulator of apoptosis. Overexpression of this gene in Hela cells was shown to confer the resistance to TNF-alpha induced apoptosis, suggesting an anti-apoptotic function of this protein. This protein can be cleaved by caspase-3 during the induction of apoptosis. Alternatively spliced transcript variants encoding distinct isoforms have been reported.
