= PTMS (gene) =

Protein-coding gene in the species Homo sapiens

Identifiers
- Aliases: PTMS, ParaT, parathymosin
- External IDs: OMIM: 168440; MGI: 1916452; HomoloGene: 136762; GeneCards: PTMS; OMA:PTMS - orthologs

Gene location (Human)
Chr.	Chromosome 12 (human)
Band	12p13.31	Start	6,765,516 bp
Band	12p13.31	End	6,770,952 bp

Gene location (Mouse)
Chr.	Chromosome 6 (mouse)
Band	6|6 F2	Start	124,890,644 bp
Band	6|6 F2	End	124,897,066 bp
RNA expression pattern
Bgee	Human / Mouse (ortholog); Top expressed in: tendon of biceps brachii; right hemisphere of cerebellum; right lobe of liver; body of uterus; ganglionic eminence; muscle layer of sigmoid colon; popliteal artery; tibial arteries; right ovary; left ovary / Top expressed in: neural layer of retina; dentate gyrus of hippocampal formation granule cell; primary visual cortex; superior frontal gyrus; perirhinal cortex; entorhinal cortex; CA3 field; ventricular zone; lactiferous gland; ascending aorta; More reference expression data
BioGPS	n/a
Gene ontology
Molecular function	zinc ion binding
Cellular component	nucleus
Biological process	DNA replication; immune system process
Sources:Amigo / QuickGO
Orthologs
Species	Human	Mouse
Entrez	5763	69202
Ensembl	ENSG00000159335	ENSMUSG00000030122
UniProt	P20962	Q9D0J8
RefSeq (mRNA)	NM_002824; NM_001330333	NM_026988
RefSeq (protein)	NP_001317262; NP_002815	NP_081264
Location (UCSC)	Chr 12: 6.77 – 6.77 Mb	Chr 6: 124.89 – 124.9 Mb
PubMed search
- Wikidata
View/Edit Human	View/Edit Mouse

Parathymosin is a protein that in humans is encoded by the PTMS gene.
