= TESPA1 =

Protein-coding gene in the species Homo sapiens

Identifiers
- Aliases: TESPA1, KIAA0748, HSPC257, thymocyte expressed, positive selection associated 1
- External IDs: OMIM: 615664; MGI: 1914846; HomoloGene: 106645; GeneCards: TESPA1; OMA:TESPA1 - orthologs

Gene location (Mouse)
Chr.	Chromosome 10 (mouse)
Band	10|10 D3	Start	130,158,739 bp
Band	10|10 D3	End	130,199,980 bp
Gene ontology
Molecular function	signaling receptor binding
Cellular component	COP9 signalosome; endoplasmic reticulum membrane; endoplasmic reticulum; membrane; cytoplasm
Biological process	COP9 signalosome assembly; positive regulation of T cell differentiation in thymus; positive regulation of T cell receptor signaling pathway
Sources:Amigo / QuickGO
Orthologs
Species	Human	Mouse
Entrez	9840	67596
Ensembl	ENSG00000135426	ENSMUSG00000034833
UniProt	A2RU30; E9PIT9	Q3U132
RefSeq (mRNA)	NM_001098815; NM_001136030; NM_001261844; NM_014796	NM_183264
RefSeq (protein)	NP_001092285; NP_001129502; NP_001248773; NP_055611; NP_001338077 NP_001338078; NP_001338079; NP_001338080; NP_001338081; NP_001338082; NP_001338083; NP_001338084	NP_899087
Location (UCSC)	n/a	Chr 10: 130.16 – 130.2 Mb
PubMed search
- Wikidata
View/Edit Human	View/Edit Mouse

Thymocyte expressed, positive selection associated 1 is a protein that in humans is encoded by the TESPA1 gene.
