= NLR family pyrin domain containing 9 pseudogene 1 =

Pseudogene in the species Homo sapiens

NLRP9P1

Identifiers
- Aliases: NLRP9P1, NOD25, NLRP9P, NLR family, pyrin domain containing 9 pseudogene 1, NLR family pyrin domain containing 9 pseudogene 1
- External IDs: GeneCards: NLRP9P1; OMA:NLRP9P1 - orthologs
Orthologs
Species	Human	Mouse
Entrez	347933	n/a
Ensembl	ENSG00000256581	n/a
UniProt	n a	n/a
RefSeq (mRNA)	n/a	n/a
RefSeq (protein)	n/a	n/a
Location (UCSC)	n/a	n/a
PubMed search		n/a
- Wikidata
View/Edit Human

NLR family pyrin domain containing 9 pseudogene 1 is a protein that in humans is encoded by the NLRP9P1 gene.
