= LARP4 =

Protein-coding gene in the species Homo sapiens

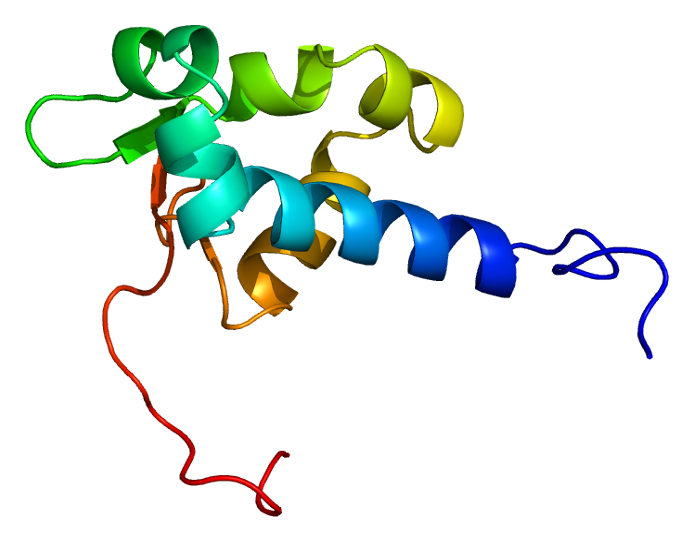
Available structures
| PDB | Ortholog search: PDBe RCSB |
| PDB | List of PDB id codes 2CQK, 3PKN |

Identifiers
- Aliases: LARP4, PP13296, La ribonucleoprotein domain family member 4
- External IDs: MGI: 2443114; HomoloGene: 19173; GeneCards: LARP4; OMA:LARP4 - orthologs

Gene location (Mouse)
| Chr. | Chromosome 15 (mouse) |
| Band | 15|15 F1 | Start | 99,867,946 bp |
| Band | 15|15 F1 | End | 99,914,239 bp |
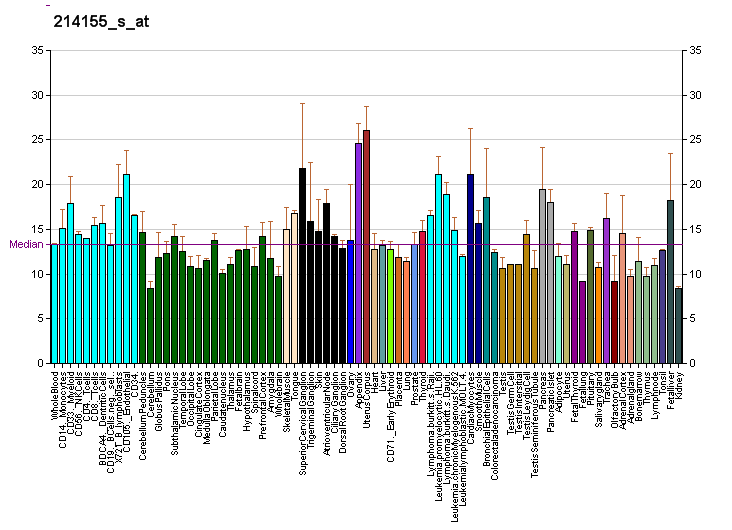

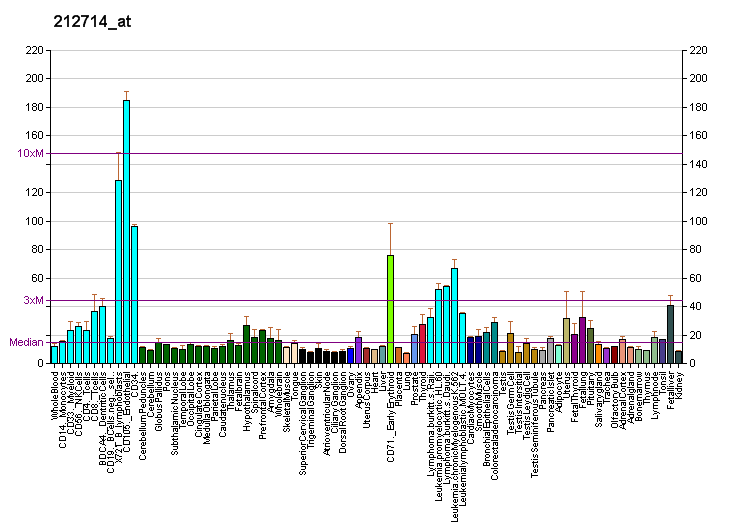
RNA expression pattern
| Bgee | Human / Mouse (ortholog); n/a / Top expressed in: tail of embryo; genital tubercle; morula; superior cervical ganglion; zygote; seminal vesicula; hand; secondary oocyte; parotid gland; lacrimal gland |
| BioGPS | More reference expression data |
Gene ontology
| Molecular function | protein binding; nucleic acid binding; poly(A) binding; RNA binding |
| Cellular component | membrane; polysome; cytoplasmic stress granule; cytosolic small ribosomal subunit; cytoplasm; cytosol |
| Biological process | regulation of cell morphogenesis; cytoskeleton organization; positive regulation of translation; protein biosynthesis |
Sources:Amigo / QuickGO
Orthologs
| Species | Human | Mouse |
| Entrez | 113251 | 207214 |
| Ensembl | ENSG00000161813 | ENSMUSG00000023025 |
| UniProt | Q71RC2 | Q8BWW4 |
| RefSeq (mRNA) | NM_001170803; NM_001170804; NM_001170808; NM_052879; NM_199188 NM_199190; NM_001330415 | NM_001024526; NM_001080948; NM_001284521; NM_001284522; NM_001284523 |
| RefSeq (protein) | NP_001164274; NP_001164275; NP_001164279; NP_001317344; NP_443111 NP_954658; NP_954660; NP_001339233; NP_001339234; NP_001339235; NP_001339236; NP_001339237; NP_001339238; NP_001339239; NP_001339240; NP_001339241; NP_001339242; NP_001339243; NP_001339244; NP_001339245; NP_001339246; NP_001339247; NP_001339248; NP_001339249; NP_001339250; NP_001339251; NP_001339252; NP_001339253; NP_001339254; NP_001339255 | NP_001019697; NP_001074417; NP_001271450; NP_001271451; NP_001271452 |
| Location (UCSC) | n/a | Chr 15: 99.87 – 99.91 Mb |
| PubMed search |
- Wikidata
| View/Edit Human | View/Edit Mouse |

La-related protein 4 is a protein that in humans is encoded by the LARP4 gene. LARP4 is an RNA-binding protein which consists of a La motif (LaM), RNA recognition motif (RRM) and a putative PABP binding motif. It has been shown that LARP4 is involved in mRNA stability.

LARP4 is known to regulate cancer cell migration and invasion by altering cell shape. It is also reported to be a glioma tumor suppressor.
