= KAT8 regulatory NSL complex subunit 1 =

Mammalian protein found in Homo sapiens

KANSL1

Identifiers
- Aliases: KANSL1, KAT8 regulatory NSL complex subunit 1, NSL1, KIAA1267, MSL1v1, CENP-36, hMSL1v1, KDVS
- External IDs: OMIM: 612452; MGI: 1923969; GeneCards: KANSL1
Available structures
PDB	Ortholog search: PDBe RCSB
PDB	List of PDB id codes 4CY1, 4CY2

Gene location (Human)
Chr.	Chromosome 17 (human)
Band	17q21.31	Start	46,029,916 bp
Band	17q21.31	End	46,225,389 bp

Gene location (Mouse)
Chr.	Chromosome 11 (mouse)
Band	11|11 E1	Start	104,333,229 bp
Band	11|11 E1	End	104,468,861 bp
RNA expression pattern
Bgee	Human / Mouse (ortholog); Top expressed in: bone marrow cell; epithelium of colon; thymus; ganglionic eminence; Achilles tendon; sural nerve; ventricular zone; testicle; cerebellar hemisphere; pylorus / Top expressed in: tail of embryo; genital tubercle; zygote; secondary oocyte; visual cortex; ventricular zone; superior frontal gyrus; primary visual cortex; granulocyte; neural layer of retina; More reference expression data
BioGPS	n/a
Gene ontology
Molecular function	histone acetyltransferase activity (H4-K5 specific); histone acetyltransferase activity (H4-K16 specific); protein binding; histone acetyltransferase activity (H4-K8 specific); histone acetyltransferase binding
Cellular component	histone acetyltransferase complex; MLL1 complex; chromosome, centromeric region; nucleus; kinetochore; chromosome; nucleoplasm; NSL complex
Biological process	histone H4-K16 acetylation; histone H4-K8 acetylation; histone H4-K5 acetylation; chromatin organization
Sources:Amigo / QuickGO
Orthologs
Databases	NCBI: entry; OMA: entry
Species	Human	Mouse
Entrez	284058	76719
Ensembl	ENSG00000278458; ENSG00000275867; ENSG00000120071	ENSMUSG00000018412
UniProt	Q7Z3B3	Q80TG1
RefSeq (mRNA)	NM_001193465; NM_001193466; NM_015443; NM_001379198	NM_001081045; NM_001359634; NM_001372458; NM_001372459; NM_001372460
RefSeq (protein)	NP_001180394; NP_001180395; NP_056258; NP_001366127	NP_001074514; NP_001346563; NP_001359387; NP_001359388; NP_001359389
Location (UCSC)	Chr 17: 46.03 – 46.23 Mb	Chr 11: 104.33 – 104.47 Mb
PubMed search
- Wikidata
View/Edit Human	View/Edit Mouse

KAT8 regulatory NSL complex subunit 1 is a protein that in humans is encoded by the KANSL1 gene (previously KIAA1267). This protein is involved in multiple kinds of epigenetic modification, and in particular it is part of two histone acetyltransferase complexes: the NSL complex, and the MLL1 complex.

== The NSL Complex ==
The NSL Complex (or Non-Specific Lethal complex), is a multi-protein complex involved in histone acetylation. In addition to the protein KANSL1, the NSL complex includes KAT8, KANSL2, KANSL3, MCRS1, PHF20, OGT, WDR5 and HCFC1. The NSL complex performs histone H4 acetylation, and specifically H4K5ac and H4K8ac, functioning to promote transcription initiation. KANSL1 interacts directly with KAT8 through the HAT domain, and functions as a non-catalytic subunit for the complex.

== Medical Significance ==
Pathogenic mutations in KANSL1 are associated with Koolen-de Vries syndrome, a developmental disorder associated with intellectual disability, hypotonia, congenital skeletal/organ malformations, and sometimes epilepsy.

== See also ==
- KAT8
- KAT8 regulatory NSL complex subunit 2
- KAT8 regulatory NSL complex subunit 3
