= C14orf93 =

Protein-coding gene in the species Homo sapiens

Identifiers
- Aliases: C14orf93, chromosome 14 open reading frame 93, RTFC
- External IDs: MGI: 1921609; HomoloGene: 11078; GeneCards: C14orf93; OMA:C14orf93 - orthologs

Gene location (Human)
Chr.	Chromosome 14 (human)
Band	14q11.2	Start	22,985,894 bp
Band	14q11.2	End	23,010,166 bp

Gene location (Mouse)
Chr.	Chromosome 14 (mouse)
Band	14|14 C2	Start	54,821,120 bp
Band	14|14 C2	End	54,843,450 bp
RNA expression pattern
Bgee	Human / Mouse (ortholog); Top expressed in: gonad; granulocyte; mucosa of transverse colon; right uterine tube; right lobe of thyroid gland; left lobe of thyroid gland; islet of Langerhans; skin of abdomen; ganglionic eminence; monocyte / Top expressed in: interventricular septum; hand; genital tubercle; tail of embryo; yolk sac; ventricular zone; embryo; muscle of thigh; seminal vesicula; granulocyte; More reference expression data
BioGPS	n/a
Orthologs
Species	Human	Mouse
Entrez	60686	74359
Ensembl	ENSG00000100802	ENSMUSG00000022179
UniProt	Q9H972	Q8K2W9
RefSeq (mRNA)	NM_001130706; NM_001130708; NM_001282968; NM_001282969; NM_001282970 NM_021944	NM_028890
RefSeq (protein)	NP_001124178; NP_001124180; NP_001269897; NP_001269898; NP_001269899 NP_068763	NP_083166
Location (UCSC)	Chr 14: 22.99 – 23.01 Mb	Chr 14: 54.82 – 54.84 Mb
PubMed search
- Wikidata
View/Edit Human	View/Edit Mouse

C14orf93 is a protein that is encoded in humans by the C14orf93 gene. It is a globular protein with a conserved C-terminus that is localized to the nucleus. While expressed relatively highly in all tissues except nervous tissue, it is expressed particularly highly in T cells and other immune tissues.

== Gene ==
c14orf93 is located on the short arm of chromosome 14 (14q11.2). c14orf93’s accession number is 021944, and its aliases are FLJ12154 and LOC60686. The gene has 2430 bp and 7 exons.

== Protein ==
=== Features ===
The c14orf93 protein has 9 isoforms. The most common and largest isoform has 538 AAs, a molecular weight of 58.7 kdal, and a theoretical isoelectric point of 5.7. This protein is globular with a conserved C-terminus, a mixed charge cluster from 371 to 399, and a high scoring uncharged segment from 28 to 58. SDSC PELE consensus data predicts 15 alpha helixes and 8 beta strands.

=== Post-translational modifications ===
Post-translational modifications to c14orf93 include phosphorylation, N-acetylation, and sumoylation. Serine phosphorylation sites are predicted at 23 residues, threonine at 6 residues, and tyrosine at 2 residues. There are two experimentally confirmed serine phosphorylation sites at residues 285 and 428, which may serve as sites of activation or deactivation. N-acetylation is predicated at the second residue; this modification affects stability and localization. There are 6 motifs with high probability of sumoylation. SUMO (small ubiquitin-like modifiers) are small proteins like ubiquitin that start a cascade involved in protein stability, nuclear-cytosolic transport, and transcriptional regulation.

=== Subcellular localization ===
PSORTII data predicts that c14orf93 is localized to the nucleus. There is a nuclear localization signal at residues 298-301. There are also two peroxisomal targeting signals at residues 451-459 and 479-487.

== Expression ==
c14orf93 is expressed 2.7 times higher than the average gene across all tissues. It is expressed relatively highly in all tissues except for nervous tissue. There is markedly higher expression seen in T cells, and there is a slightly higher expression pattern shown in other immune tissues such as bone marrow, spleen, and lymph nodes.

== Interacting Proteins ==
C14orf93 has been shown to physically interact with PTP1, MRFAP1, Set, APP, and MOV10; these interactions are listed in the table below. The organism column shows where the protein was sourced in the experiment showing the physical interactions.

Protein	Organism
PTP1	Saccharomyces cerevisiae S288c
MRFAP1	Homo sapiens
Set	Mus musculus
APP	Homo sapiens
MOV10	Homo sapiens

Of these five interactions, PTP1, MRFAP1, and SET have gone through the most verification. PTP1, tyrosine-protein phosphatase 1, is a protein found in yeast, but there is an ortholog in humans. PTP1 may be responsible for activating/deactivating c14orf93 due to its phosphatase activity and perinuclear location. MRFAP1, MORF4 family-associated protein 1, is a human protein that interacts with members of the MORF4/MRG family and the tumor suppressor Rb. This protein may be involved in senescence, cell growth, and immortalization. There is a human ortholog to mouse Set protein (phosphatase 2A inhibitor or I2PP2A), and it is localized to the nucleus. Set binds to DNA in order to negatively regulate neuron apoptotic processes and transcription, functioning as an oncogene.

== Homology ==
There are orthologs for c14orf93 in all vertebrates from Homo sapiens to bony fish. There are no paralogs for c14orf93. C14orf93 is part of the family DUF4616; this family is marked by a domain of unknown function in the C-terminal domain. DUF4616 proteins are between 166 and 538 amino acids in length, and they are part of the sI21231 superfamily. The last 200 residues C-terminus is highly conserved with a seventeen residue pattern from 439-456 that is notably conserved in all orthologs. This region likely plays a major part in the function of c14orf93.
