= ASPSCR1 =

Protein-coding gene in the species Homo sapiens

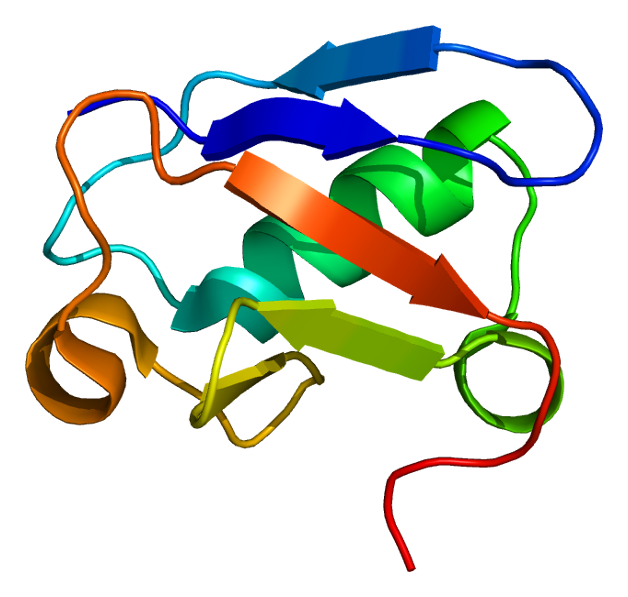

Identifiers
- Aliases: ASPSCR1, ASPCR1, ASPL, ASPS, RCC17, TUG, UBXD9, UBXN9, alveolar soft part sarcoma chromosome region, candidate 1, UBX domain containing tether for SLC2A4, ASPSCR1 tether for SLC2A4, UBX domain containing
- External IDs: OMIM: 606236; MGI: 1916188; GeneCards: ASPSCR1
Available structures
PDB	Ortholog search: PDBe RCSB
PDB	List of PDB id codes 2AL3

Gene location (Human)
Chr.	Chromosome 17 (human)
Band	17q25.3	Start	81,976,807 bp
Band	17q25.3	End	82,017,406 bp

Gene location (Mouse)
Chr.	Chromosome 11 (mouse)
Band	11|11 E2	Start	120,563,799 bp
Band	11|11 E2	End	120,600,273 bp
RNA expression pattern
Bgee	Human / Mouse (ortholog); Top expressed in: right lobe of liver; apex of heart; anterior pituitary; right hemisphere of cerebellum; muscle of thigh; right lobe of thyroid gland; left lobe of thyroid gland; gastrocnemius muscle; right testis; gonad / Top expressed in: spermatid; spermatocyte; granulocyte; right kidney; seminiferous tubule; lip; yolk sac; duodenum; muscle of thigh; left lobe of liver; More reference expression data
BioGPS	n/a
Gene ontology
Molecular function	protein binding
Cellular component	extrinsic component of membrane; cytoplasm; perinuclear region of cytoplasm; membrane; cytosol; cytoplasmic side of plasma membrane; plasma membrane; endoplasmic reticulum-Golgi intermediate compartment membrane; intracellular membrane-bounded organelle; endomembrane system; nucleus; nucleoplasm; vesicle membrane
Biological process	intracellular protein transport; glucose homeostasis; regulation of glucose import; positive regulation of protein modification process
Sources:Amigo / QuickGO
Orthologs
Databases	NCBI: entry; OMA: entry
Species	Human	Mouse
Entrez	79058	68938
Ensembl	ENSG00000169696	ENSMUSG00000025142
UniProt	Q9BZE9	Q8VBT9
RefSeq (mRNA)	NM_001251888; NM_024083; NM_001330528	NM_001164224; NM_026877; NM_198223; NM_001363055; NM_001363056
RefSeq (protein)	NP_001238817; NP_001317457; NP_076988	NP_001157696; NP_081153; NP_937866; NP_001349984; NP_001349985
Location (UCSC)	Chr 17: 81.98 – 82.02 Mb	Chr 11: 120.56 – 120.6 Mb
PubMed search
- Wikidata
View/Edit Human	View/Edit Mouse

Tether containing UBX domain for GLUT4 (TUG) is a protein that in humans is encoded by the ASPSCR1 gene.

This gene is a candidate gene for alveolar soft part sarcoma (ASPS). It has been found that ASPSCR1 can undergo oncogenic rearrangement with transcription factor TFE3 gene, creating an aberrant gene that is a stronger transcriptional activator than TFE3 alone. This fusion oncogene encodes for a chimeric transcription factor, which is responsible for the production of multiple molecules that contribute to ASPS and also to renal cell carcinomas. Several alternatively spliced transcript variants of this gene have been described, but their full length nature has not been determined.
