= PRCC =

PRCC may refer to:

- Puerto Rico Convention Center
- PRCC (gene)
