= Retinoblastoma protein =

Mammalian protein found in humans

RB1
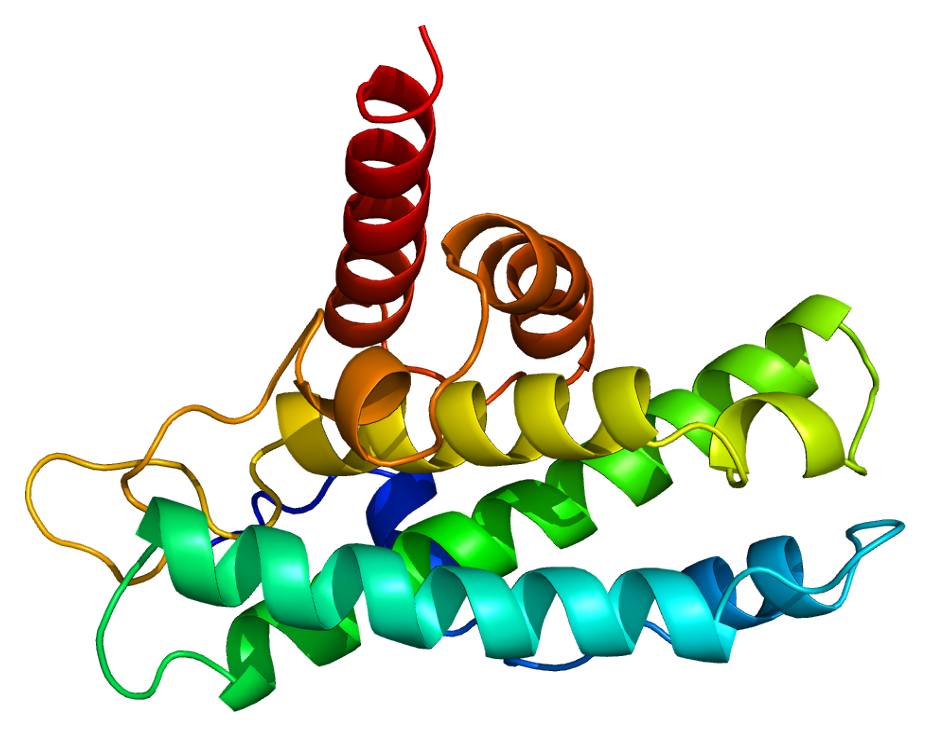

Identifiers
- Aliases: RB1, pRb, RB, retinoblastoma 1, OSRC, PPP1R130, p105-Rb, pp110, Retinoblastoma protein, RB transcriptional corepressor 1, p110-RB1
- External IDs: OMIM: 614041; MGI: 97874; GeneCards: RB1
Available structures
PDB	Ortholog search: PDBe RCSB
PDB	List of PDB id codes 1AD6, 1GH6, 1GUX, 1H25, 1N4M, 1O9K, 1PJM, 2AZE, 2QDJ, 2R7G, 3N5U, 3POM, 4ELJ, 4ELL, 4CRI

Gene location (Human)
Chr.	Chromosome 13 (human)
Band	13q14.2	Start	48,303,744 bp
Band	13q14.2	End	48,599,436 bp

Gene location (Mouse)
Chr.	Chromosome 14 (mouse)
Band	14 38.73 cM|14 D3	Start	73,421,113 bp
Band	14 38.73 cM|14 D3	End	73,563,262 bp
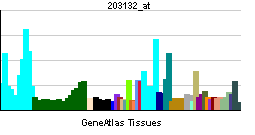

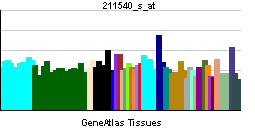
RNA expression pattern
Bgee	Human / Mouse (ortholog); Top expressed in: epithelium of nasopharynx; Epithelium of choroid plexus; visceral pleura; germinal epithelium; gingival epithelium; palpebral conjunctiva; parietal pleura; seminal vesicula; mucosa of paranasal sinus; Brodmann area 23 / Top expressed in: molar; fetal liver hematopoietic progenitor cell; blood; tibiofemoral joint; human fetus; hair follicle; secondary oocyte; cumulus cell; sexually immature organism; zygote; More reference expression data
BioGPS	More reference expression data
Gene ontology
Molecular function	DNA binding; DNA-binding transcription factor activity; transcription coactivator activity; transcription factor binding; phosphoprotein binding; kinase binding; protein binding; androgen receptor binding; identical protein binding; enzyme binding; ubiquitin protein ligase binding; importin-alpha family protein binding; disordered domain specific binding; cis-regulatory region sequence-specific DNA binding; DNA-binding transcription repressor activity, RNA polymerase II-specific
Cellular component	PML body; SWI/SNF complex; transcription regulator complex; spindle; cyclin/CDK positive transcription elongation factor complex; chromatin; nucleus; nucleoplasm; Rb-E2F complex
Biological process	negative regulation of cell population proliferation; negative regulation of mitotic cell cycle; neuron apoptotic process; androgen receptor signaling pathway; chromatin remodeling; negative regulation of smoothened signaling pathway; negative regulation of protein kinase activity; cell morphogenesis involved in neuron differentiation; mitotic cell cycle checkpoint signaling; regulation of transcription by RNA polymerase II; positive regulation of macrophage differentiation; cellular response to xenobiotic stimulus; negative regulation of cell cycle; negative regulation of DNA-binding transcription factor activity; transcription, DNA-templated; glial cell apoptotic process; regulation of cohesin loading; regulation of cell cycle; neuron maturation; cell division; positive regulation of transcription, DNA-templated; negative regulation of G1/S transition of mitotic cell cycle; positive regulation of mitotic metaphase/anaphase transition; regulation of centromere complex assembly; enucleate erythrocyte differentiation; neuron differentiation; regulation of mitotic cell cycle; negative regulation of epithelial cell proliferation; skeletal muscle cell differentiation; sister chromatid biorientation; protein localization to chromosome, centromeric region; cell cycle; striated muscle cell differentiation; Ras protein signal transduction; myoblast differentiation; viral process; negative regulation of transcription, DNA-templated; neuron projection development; digestive tract development; maintenance of mitotic sister chromatid cohesion; regulation of lipid kinase activity; positive regulation of transcription by RNA polymerase II; hepatocyte apoptotic process; apoptotic process; positive regulation of transcription regulatory region DNA binding; negative regulation of gene expression; regulation of cell growth; tissue homeostasis; regulation of transcription, DNA-templated; G1/S transition of mitotic cell cycle; negative regulation of transcription by RNA polymerase II; negative regulation of transcription involved in G1/S transition of mitotic cell cycle; chromatin organization; aortic valve morphogenesis; negative regulation of inflammatory response; positive regulation of extracellular matrix organization; positive regulation of collagen fibril organization; negative regulation of myofibroblast differentiation; cell differentiation; negative regulation of cold-induced thermogenesis; negative regulation of protein serine/threonine kinase activity; negative regulation of tau-protein kinase activity; negative regulation of apoptotic signaling pathway
Sources:Amigo / QuickGO
Orthologs
Databases	NCBI: entry; OMA: entry
Species	Human	Mouse
Entrez	5925	19645
Ensembl	ENSG00000139687	ENSMUSG00000022105
UniProt	P06400	P13405
RefSeq (mRNA)	NM_000321	NM_009029
RefSeq (protein)	NP_000312; NP_000312.2	NP_033055
Location (UCSC)	Chr 13: 48.3 – 48.6 Mb	Chr 14: 73.42 – 73.56 Mb
PubMed search
- Wikidata
View/Edit Human	View/Edit Mouse

The retinoblastoma protein (protein name abbreviated Rb or pRb; gene name abbreviated Rb, RB or RB1) is a tumor suppressor protein that is dysfunctional in several major cancers. One function of pRb is to prevent excessive cell growth by inhibiting cell cycle progression until a cell is ready to divide. When the cell is ready to divide, pRb is inactivated by phosphorylation, and the cell cycle is allowed to progress. It is also a recruiter of several chromatin remodeling enzymes such as methylases and acetylases.

pRb belongs to the pocket protein family, whose members have a pocket for the functional binding of other proteins. Should an oncogenic protein, such as those produced by cells infected by high-risk types of human papillomavirus, bind and inactivate pRb, this can lead to cancer. The RB gene may have been responsible for the evolution of multicellularity in several lineages of life including animals.

== Name and genetics ==
In humans, the protein is encoded by the RB1 gene located on chromosome 13—more specifically, 13q14.1-q14.2. If both alleles of this gene are mutated in a retinal cell, the protein is inactivated and the cells grow uncontrollably, resulting in development of retinoblastoma, hence the "RB" in the name 'pRb'. Thus most pRb knock-outs occur in retinal tissue when UV radiation-induced mutation inactivates all healthy copies of the gene, but pRb knock-out has also been documented in certain skin cancers in patients from New Zealand where the amount of UV radiation is significantly higher.

Two forms of retinoblastoma were noticed: a bilateral, familial form and a unilateral, sporadic form. Sufferers of the former were over six times more likely to develop other types of cancer later in life, compared to individuals with sporadic retinoblastoma. This highlighted the fact that mutated pRb could be inherited and lent support for the two-hit hypothesis. This states that only one working allele of a tumour suppressor gene is necessary for its function (the mutated gene is recessive), and so both need to be mutated before the cancer phenotype will appear. In the familial form, a mutated allele is inherited along with a normal allele. In this case, should a cell sustain only one mutation in the other RB gene, all pRb in that cell would be ineffective at inhibiting cell cycle progression, allowing cells to divide uncontrollably and eventually become cancerous. Furthermore, as one allele is already mutated in all other somatic cells, the future incidence of cancers in these individuals is observed with linear kinetics. The working allele need not undergo a mutation per se, as loss of heterozygosity (LOH) is frequently observed in such tumours.

However, in the sporadic form, both alleles would need to sustain a mutation before the cell can become cancerous. This explains why sufferers of sporadic retinoblastoma are not at increased risk of cancers later in life, as both alleles are functional in all their other cells. Future cancer incidence in sporadic pRb cases is observed with polynomial kinetics, not exactly quadratic as expected because the first mutation must arise through normal mechanisms, and then can be duplicated by LOH to result in a tumour progenitor.

RB1 orthologs have also been identified in most mammals for which complete genome data are available.

RB/E2F-family proteins repress transcription.

== Structure denotes function ==
pRb is a multifunctional protein with many binding and phosphorylation sites. Although its common function is seen as binding and repressing E2F targets, pRb is likely a multifunctional protein as it binds to at least 100 other proteins.

pRb has three major structural components: a carboxy-terminus, a "pocket" subunit, and an amino-terminus. Within each domain, there are a variety of protein binding sites, as well as a total of 15 possible phosphorylation sites. Generally, phosphorylation causes interdomain locking, which changes pRb's conformation and prevents binding to target proteins. Different sites may be phosphorylated at different times, giving rise to many possible conformations and likely many functions/activity levels.

== Cell cycle suppression ==
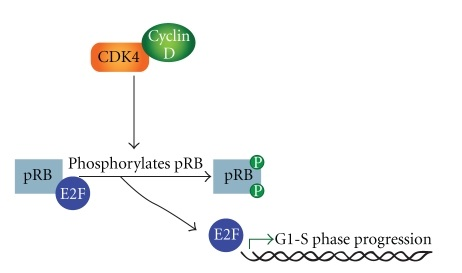
Role of CDK4, cyklin D, Rb and E2F in cell cycle regulation

pRb restricts the cell's ability to replicate DNA by preventing its progression from the G1 (first gap phase) to S (synthesis phase) phase of the cell division cycle. pRb binds and inhibits E2 promoter-binding–protein-dimerization partner (E2F-DP) dimers, which are transcription factors of the E2F family that push the cell into S phase. By keeping E2F-DP inactivated, RB1 maintains the cell in the G1 phase, preventing progression through the cell cycle and acting as a growth suppressor. The pRb-E2F/DP complex also attracts a histone deacetylase (HDAC) protein to the chromatin, reducing transcription of S phase promoting factors, further suppressing DNA synthesis.

=== pRb attenuates protein levels of known E2F Targets ===
pRb has the ability to reversibly inhibit DNA replication through transcriptional repression of DNA replication factors. pRb is able to bind to transcription factors in the E2F family and thereby inhibit their function. When pRb is chronically activated, it leads to the downregulation of the necessary DNA replication factors. Within 72–96 hours of active pRb induction in A2-4 cells, the target DNA replication factor proteins—MCMs, RPA34, DBF4, RFCp37, and RFCp140—all showed decreased levels. Along with decreased levels, there was a simultaneous and expected inhibition of DNA replication in these cells. This process, however, is reversible. Following induced knockout of pRb, cells treated with cisplatin, a DNA-damaging agent, were able to continue proliferating, without cell cycle arrest, suggesting pRb plays an important role in triggering chronic S-phase arrest in response to genotoxic stress.

One such example of E2F-regulated genes repressed by pRb are cyclin E and cyclin A. Both of these cyclins are able to bind to Cdk2 and facilitate entry into the S phase of the cell cycle. Through the repression of expression of cyclin E and cyclin A, pRb is able to inhibit the G1/S transition.

=== Repression mechanisms of E2Fs ===
There are at least three distinct mechanisms in which pRb can repress transcription of E2F-regulated promoters. Though these mechanisms are known, it is unclear which are the most important for the control of the cell cycle.

E2Fs are a family of proteins whose binding sites are often found in the promoter regions of genes for cell proliferation or progression of the cell cycle. E2F1 to E2F5 are known to associate with proteins in the pRb-family of proteins while E2F6 and E2F7 are independent of pRb. Broadly, the E2Fs are split into activator E2Fs and repressor E2Fs though their role is more flexible than that on occasion. The activator E2Fs are E2F1, E2F2 and E2F3 while the repressor E2Fs are E2F4, E2F5 and E2F6. Activator E2Fs along with E2F4 bind exclusively to pRb. pRb is able to bind to the activation domain of the activator E2Fs which blocks their activity, repressing transcription of the genes controlled by that E2F-promoter.

==== Blocking of pre-initiation complex assembly ====
The preinitiation complex (PIC) assembles in a stepwise fashion on the promoter of genes to initiate transcription. The TFIID binds to the TATA box in order to begin the assembly of the TFIIA, recruiting other transcription factors and components needed in the PIC. Data suggests that pRb is able to repress transcription by both pRb being recruited to the promoter as well as having a target present in TFIID.

The presence of pRb may change the conformation of the TFIIA/IID complex into a less active version with a decreased binding affinity. pRb can also directly interfere with their association as proteins, preventing TFIIA/IID from forming an active complex.

==== Modification of chromatin structure ====
pRb acts as a recruiter that allows for the binding of proteins that alter chromatin structure onto the site E2F-regulated promoters. Access to these E2F-regulated promoters by transcriptional factors is blocked by the formation of nucleosomes and their further packing into chromatin. Nucleosome formation is regulated by post-translational modifications to histone tails. Acetylation leads to the disruption of nucleosome structure. Proteins called histone acetyltransferases (HATs) are responsible for acetylating histones and thus facilitating the association of transcription factors on DNA promoters. Deacetylation, on the other hand, leads to nucleosome formation and thus makes it more difficult for transcription factors to sit on promoters. Histone deacetylases (HDACs) are the proteins responsible for facilitating nucleosome formation and are therefore associated with transcriptional repressors proteins.

pRb interacts with the histone deacetylases HDAC1 and HDAC3. pRb binds to HDAC1 in its pocket domain in a region that is independent to its E2F-binding site. pRb recruitment of histone deacetylases leads to the repression of genes at E2F-regulated promoters due to nucleosome formation. Some genes activated during the G1/S transition such as cyclin E are repressed by HDAC during early to mid-G1 phase. This suggests that HDAC-assisted repression of cell cycle progression genes is crucial for the ability of pRb to arrest cells in G1. To further add to this point, the HDAC-pRb complex is shown to be disrupted by cyclin D/Cdk4 which levels increase and peak during the late G1 phase.

== Senescence induced by pRb ==
Senescence in cells is a state in which cells are metabolically active but are no longer able to replicate. pRb is an important regulator of senescence in cells and since this prevents proliferation, senescence is an important antitumor mechanism. pRb may occupy E2F-regulated promoters during senescence. For example, pRb was detected on the cyclin A and PCNA promoters in senescent cells.

=== S-phase arrest ===
Cells respond to stress in the form of DNA damage, activated oncogenes, or sub-par growing conditions, and can enter a senescence-like state called "premature senescence". This allows the cell to prevent further replication during periods of damaged DNA or general unfavorable conditions. DNA damage in a cell can induce pRb activation. pRb's role in repressing the transcription of cell cycle progression genes leads to the S phase arrest that prevents replication of damaged DNA.

== Activation and inactivation ==
When it is time for a cell to enter S phase, complexes of cyclin-dependent kinases (CDK) and cyclins phosphorylate pRb, allowing E2F-DP to dissociate from pRb and become active. When E2F is free it activates factors like cyclins (e.g. cyclin E and cyclin A), which push the cell through the cell cycle by activating cyclin-dependent kinases, and a molecule called proliferating cell nuclear antigen, or PCNA, which speeds DNA replication and repair by helping to attach polymerase to DNA.

=== Inactivation ===
Since the 1990s, pRb was known to be inactivated via phosphorylation. Until, the prevailing model was that Cyclin D- Cdk 4/6 progressively phosphorylated it from its unphosphorylated to its hyperphosphorylated state (14+ phosphorylations). However, it was recently shown that pRb only exists in three states: un-phosphorylated, mono-phosphorylated, and hyper-phosphorylated. Each has a unique cellular function.

Before the development of 2D IEF, only hyper-phosphorylated pRb was distinguishable from all other forms, i.e. un-phosphorylated pRb resembled mono-phosphorylated pRb on immunoblots. As pRb was either in its active "hypo-phosphorylated" state or inactive "hyperphosphorylated" state. However, with 2D IEF, it is now known that pRb is un-phosphorylated in G0 cells and mono-phosphorylated in early G1 cells, prior to hyper-phosphorylation after the restriction point in late G1.

==== pRb mono phosphorylation ====
When a cell enters G1, Cyclin D- Cdk4/6 phosphorylates pRb at a single phosphorylation site. No progressive phosphorylation occurs because when HFF cells were exposed to sustained cyclin D- Cdk4/6 activity (and even deregulated activity) in early G1, only mono-phosphorylated pRb was detected. Furthermore, triple knockout, p16 addition, and Cdk 4/6 inhibitor addition experiments confirmed that Cyclin D- Cdk 4/6 is the sole phosphorylator of pRb.

Throughout early G1, mono-phosphorylated pRb exists as 14 different isoforms (the 15th phosphorylation site is not conserved in primates in which the experiments were performed). Together, these isoforms represent the "hypo-phosphorylated" active pRb state that was thought to exist. Each isoform has distinct preferences to associate with different exogenous expressed E2Fs.

A recent report showed that mono-phosphorylation controls pRb's association with other proteins and generates functional distinct forms of pRb. All different mono-phosphorylated pRb isoforms inhibit E2F transcriptional program and are able to arrest cells in G1-phase. Importantly, different mono-phosphorylated forms of pRb have distinct transcriptional outputs that are extended beyond E2F regulation.

==== Hyper-phosphorylation ====
After a cell passes the restriction point, Cyclin E - Cdk 2 hyper-phosphorylates all mono-phosphorylated isoforms. While the exact mechanism is unknown, one hypothesis is that binding to the C-terminus tail opens the pocket subunit, allowing access to all phosphorylation sites. This process is hysteretic and irreversible, and it is thought accumulation of mono-phosphorylated pRb induces the process. The bistable, switch like behavior of pRb can thus be modeled as a bifurcation point:

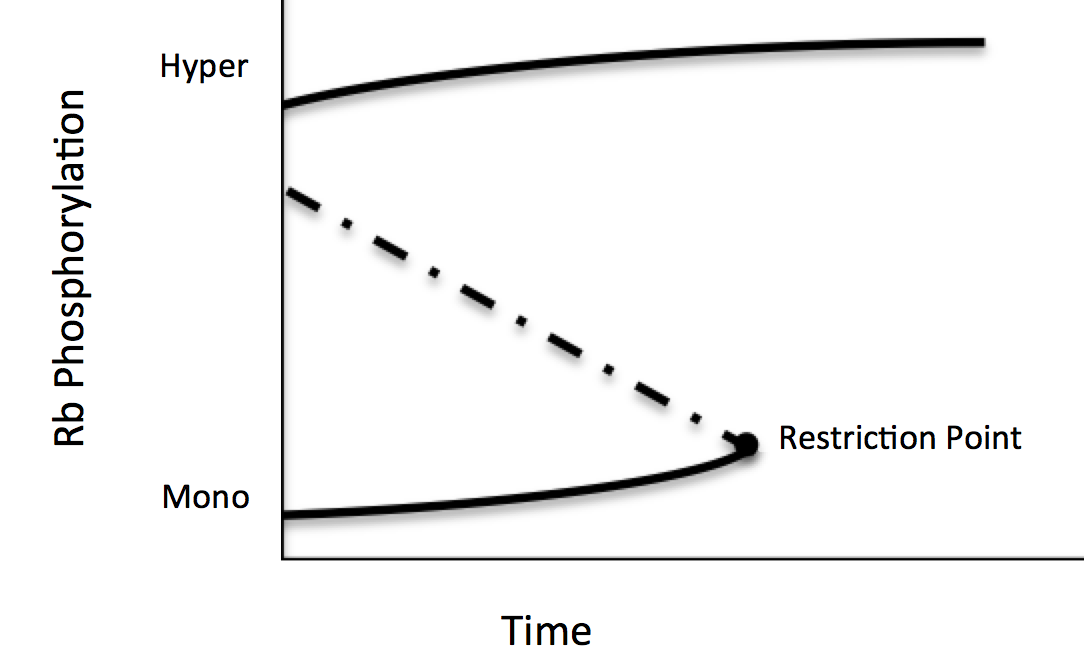
Hyper-phosphorylation of mono-phosphorylated pRb is an irreversible event that allows entry into S phase.

=== Control of pRb function by phosphorylation ===
Presence of un-phosphorylated pRb drives cell cycle exit and maintains senescence. At the end of mitosis, PP1 dephosphorylates hyper-phosphorylated pRb directly to its un-phosphorylated state. Furthermore, when cycling C2C12 myoblast cells differentiated (by being placed into a differentiation medium), only un-phosphorylated pRb was present. Additionally, these cells had a markedly decreased growth rate and concentration of DNA replication factors (suggesting G0 arrest).

This function of un-phosphorylated pRb gives rise to a hypothesis for the lack of cell cycle control in cancerous cells: Deregulation of Cyclin D - Cdk 4/6 phosphorylates un-phosphorylated pRb in senescent cells to mono-phosphorylated pRb, causing them to enter G1. The mechanism of the switch for Cyclin E activation is not known, but one hypothesis is that it is a metabolic sensor. Mono-phosphorylated pRb induces an increase in metabolism, so the accumulation of mono-phosphorylated pRb in previously G0 cells then causes hyper-phosphorylation and mitotic entry. Since any un-phosphorylated pRb is immediately phosphorylated, the cell is then unable to exit the cell cycle, resulting in continuous division.

DNA damage to G0 cells activates Cyclin D - Cdk 4/6, resulting in mono-phosphorylation of un-phosphorylated pRb. Then, active mono-phosphorylated pRb causes repression of E2F-targeted genes specifically. Therefore, mono-phosphorylated pRb is thought to play an active role in DNA damage response, so that E2F gene repression occurs until the damage is fixed and the cell can pass the restriction point. As a side note, the discovery that damages causes Cyclin D - Cdk 4/6 activation even in G0 cells should be kept in mind when patients are treated with both DNA damaging chemotherapy and Cyclin D - Cdk 4/6 inhibitors.

=== Activation ===
During the M-to-G1 transition, pRb is then progressively dephosphorylated by PP1, returning to its growth-suppressive hypophosphorylated state.

pRb family proteins are components of the DREAM complex composed of DP, E2F4/5, RB-like (p130/p107) And MuvB (Lin9:Lin37:Lin52:RbAbP4:Lin54). The DREAM complex is assembled in Go/G1 and maintains quiescence by assembling at the promoters of > 800 cell-cycle genes and mediating transcriptional repression. Assembly of DREAM requires DYRK1A (Ser/Thr kinase) dependant phosphorylation of the MuvB core component, Lin52 at Serine28. This mechanism is crucial for recruitment of p130/p107 to the MuvB core and thus DREAM assembly.

== Consequences of pRb loss ==
Consequences of loss of pRb function is dependent on cell type and cell cycle status, as pRb's tumor suppressive role changes depending on the state and current identity of the cell.

In G0 quiescent stem cells, pRb is proposed to maintain G0 arrest although the mechanism remains largely unknown. Loss of pRb leads to exit from quiescence and an increase in the number of cells without loss of cell renewal capacity. In cycling progenitor cells, pRb plays a role at the G1, S, and G2 checkpoints and promotes differentiation. In differentiated cells, which make up the majority of cells in the body and are assumed to be in irreversible G0, pRb maintains both arrest and differentiation.

Loss of pRb therefore exhibits multiple different responses within different cells that ultimately all could result in cancer phenotypes. For cancer initiation, loss of pRb may induce cell cycle re-entry in both quiescent and post-mitotic differentiated cells through dedifferentiation. In cancer progression, loss of pRb decreases the differentiating potential of cycling cells, increases chromosomal instability, prevents induction of cellular senescence, promotes angiogenesis, and increases metastatic potential.

Although most cancers rely on glycolysis for energy production (Warburg effect), cancers due to pRb loss tend to upregulate oxidative phosphorylation. The increased oxidative phosphorylation can increase stemness, metastasis, and (when enough oxygen is available) cellular energy for anabolism.

In vivo, it is still not entirely clear how and which cell types cancer initiation occurs with solely loss of pRb, but it is clear that the pRb pathway is altered in large number of human cancers.[110] In mice, loss of pRb is sufficient to initiate tumors of the pituitary and thyroid glands, and mechanisms of initiation for these hyperplasia are currently being investigated.

== Non-canonical roles ==
The classic view of pRb's role as a tumor suppressor and cell cycle regulator developed through research investigating mechanisms of interactions with E2F family member proteins. Yet, more data generated from biochemical experiments and clinical trials reveal other functions of pRb within the cell unrelated (or indirectly related) to tumor suppression.

=== Functional hyperphosphorylated pRb ===
In proliferating cells, certain pRb conformations (when RxL motif if bound by protein phosphatase 1 or when it is acetylated or methylated) are resistant to CDK phosphorylation and retain other function throughout cell cycle progression, suggesting not all pRb in the cell are devoted to guarding the G1/S transition.

Studies have also demonstrated that hyperphosphorylated pRb can specifically bind E2F1 and form stable complexes throughout the cell cycle to carry out unique unexplored functions, a surprising contrast from the classical view of pRb releasing E2F factors upon phosphorylation.

In summary, many new findings about pRb's resistance to CDK phosphorylation are emerging in pRb research and shedding light on novel roles of pRb beyond cell cycle regulation.

=== Genome stability ===
pRb is able to be localize to sites of DNA breaks during the repair process and assist in non-homologous end joining and homologous recombination through complexing with E2F1. Once at the breaks, pRb is able to recruit regulators of chromatin structure such as the DNA helicase transcription activator BRG1. pRb has been shown to also be able to recruit protein complexes such as condensin and cohesin to assist in the structural maintenance of chromatin.

Such findings suggest that in addition to its tumor suppressive role with E2F, pRb is also distributed throughout the genome to aid in important processes of genome maintenance such as DNA break-repair, DNA replication, chromosome condensation, and heterochromatin formation.

=== Regulation of metabolism ===
pRb has also been implicated in regulating metabolism through interactions with components of cellular metabolic pathways. RB1 mutations can cause alterations in metabolism, including reduced mitochondrial respiration, reduced activity in the electron transport chain, and changes in flux of glucose and/or glutamine. Particular forms of pRb have been found to localize to the outer mitochondrial membrane and directly interacts with Bax to promote apoptosis.

== As a drug target ==
=== pRb Reactivation ===
While the frequency of alterations of the RB gene is substantial for many human cancer types including as lung, esophageal, and liver, alterations in up-steam regulatory components of pRb such as CDK4 and CDK6 have been the main targets for potential therapeutics to treat cancers with dysregulation in the RB pathway. This focus has resulted in the recent development and FDA clinical approval of three small molecule CDK4/6 inhibitors (palbociclib (Ibrance, Pfizer 2015), ribociclib (Kisqali, Novartis 2017), and abemaciclib (Verzenio, Eli Lilly 2017) for the treatment of specific breast cancer subtypes. However, recent clinical studies finding limited efficacy, high toxicity, and acquired resistance of these inhibitors suggests the need to further elucidate mechanisms that influence CDK4/6 activity as well as explore other potential targets downstream in the pRb pathway to reactivate pRb's tumor suppressive functions. Treatment of cancers by CDK4/6 inhibitors depends on the presence of pRb within the cell for therapeutic effect, limiting their usage only to cancers where RB is not mutated and pRb protein levels are not significantly depleted.

Direct pRb reactivation in humans has not been achieved. However, in murine models, novel genetic methods have allowed for in vivo pRb reactivation experiments. pRb loss induced in mice with oncogenic KRAS-driven tumors of lung adenocarcinoma negates the requirement of MAPK signal amplification for progression to carcinoma and promotes loss of lineage commitment as well as accelerate the acquisition of metastatic competency. Reactivation of pRb in these mice rescues the tumors towards a less metastatic state, but does not completely stop tumor growth due to a proposed rewiring of MAPK pathway signaling, which suppresses pRb through a CDK-dependent mechanism.

=== Pro-apoptotic effects of pRb loss ===
Besides trying to re-activate the tumor suppressive function of pRb, one other distinct approach to treat dysregulated pRb pathway cancers is to take advantage of certain cellular consequences induced by pRb loss. It has been shown that E2F stimulates expression of pro-apoptotic genes in addition to G1/S transition genes, however, cancer cells have developed defensive signaling pathways that protect themselves from death by deregulated E2F activity. Development of inhibitors of these protective pathways could thus be a synthetically lethal method to kill cancer cells with overactive E2F.

In addition, it has been shown that the pro-apoptotic activity of p53 is restrained by the pRb pathway, such that pRb deficient tumor cells become sensitive to p53 mediated cell death. This opens the door to research of compounds that could activate p53 activity in these cancer cells and induce apoptosis and reduce cell proliferation.

== Regeneration ==
While the loss of a tumor suppressor such as pRb leading to uncontrolled cell proliferation is detrimental in the context of cancer, it may be beneficial to deplete or inhibit suppressive functions of pRb in the context of cellular regeneration. Harvesting the proliferative abilities of cells induced to a controlled "cancer like" state could aid in repairing damaged tissues and delay aging phenotypes. This idea remains to be thoroughly explored as a potential cellular injury and anti-aging treatment.

=== Cochlea ===
The retinoblastoma protein is involved in the growth and development of mammalian hair cells of the cochlea, and appears to be related to the cells' inability to regenerate. Embryonic hair cells require pRb, among other important proteins, to exit the cell-cycle and stop dividing, which allows maturation of the auditory system. Once wild-type mammals have reached adulthood, their cochlear hair cells become incapable of proliferation. In studies where the gene for pRb is deleted in mice cochlea, hair cells continue to proliferate in early adulthood. Though this may seem to be a positive development, pRb-knockdown mice tend to develop severe hearing loss due to degeneration of the organ of Corti. For this reason, pRb seems to be instrumental for completing the development of mammalian hair cells and keeping them alive. However, it is clear that without pRb, hair cells have the ability to proliferate, which is why pRb is known as a tumor suppressor. Temporarily and precisely turning off pRb in adult mammals with damaged hair cells may lead to propagation and therefore successful regeneration. Suppressing function of the retinoblastoma protein in the adult rat cochlea has been found to cause proliferation of supporting cells and hair cells. pRb can be downregulated by activating the sonic hedgehog pathway, which phosphorylates the proteins and reduces gene transcription.

=== Neurons ===
Disrupting pRb expression in vitro, either by gene deletion or knockdown of pRb short interfering RNA, causes dendrites to branch out farther. In addition, Schwann cells, which provide essential support for the survival of neurons, travel with the neurites, extending farther than normal. The inhibition of pRb supports the continued growth of nerve cells.

== Interactions ==
pRb is known to interact with more than 300 proteins, some of which are listed below:

- Abl gene
- Androgen receptor
- Apoptosis-antagonizing transcription factor
- ARID4A
- Aryl hydrocarbon receptor
- BRCA1
- BRF1
- C-jun
- C-Raf
- CDK9
- CUTL1
- Cyclin A1
- Cyclin D1
- Cyclin T2
- DNMT1
- E2F1
- E2F2,
- E4F1
- EID1
- ENC1
- FRK
- HBP1
- HDAC1
- HDAC3
- Histone deacetylase 2
- Insulin
- JARID1A
- Large tumor antigen
- LIN9
- MCM7
- MORF4L1
- MRFAP1,
- MyoD
- NCOA6
- PA2G4
- Peroxisome proliferator-activated receptor gamma
- PIK3R3
- Plasminogen activator inhibitor-2
- Polymerase (DNA directed), alpha 1
- PRDM2
- PRKRA
- Prohibitin
- Promyelocytic leukemia protein
- RBBP4
- RBBP7
- RBBP8
- RBBP9
- SNAPC1
- SKP2
- SNAPC3
- SNW1
- SUV39H1
- TAF1
- THOC1
- TRAP1
- TRIP11
- UBTF
- USP4.

== Detection ==
Several methods for detecting the RB1 gene mutations have been developed including a method that can detect large deletions that correlate with advanced stage retinoblastoma.

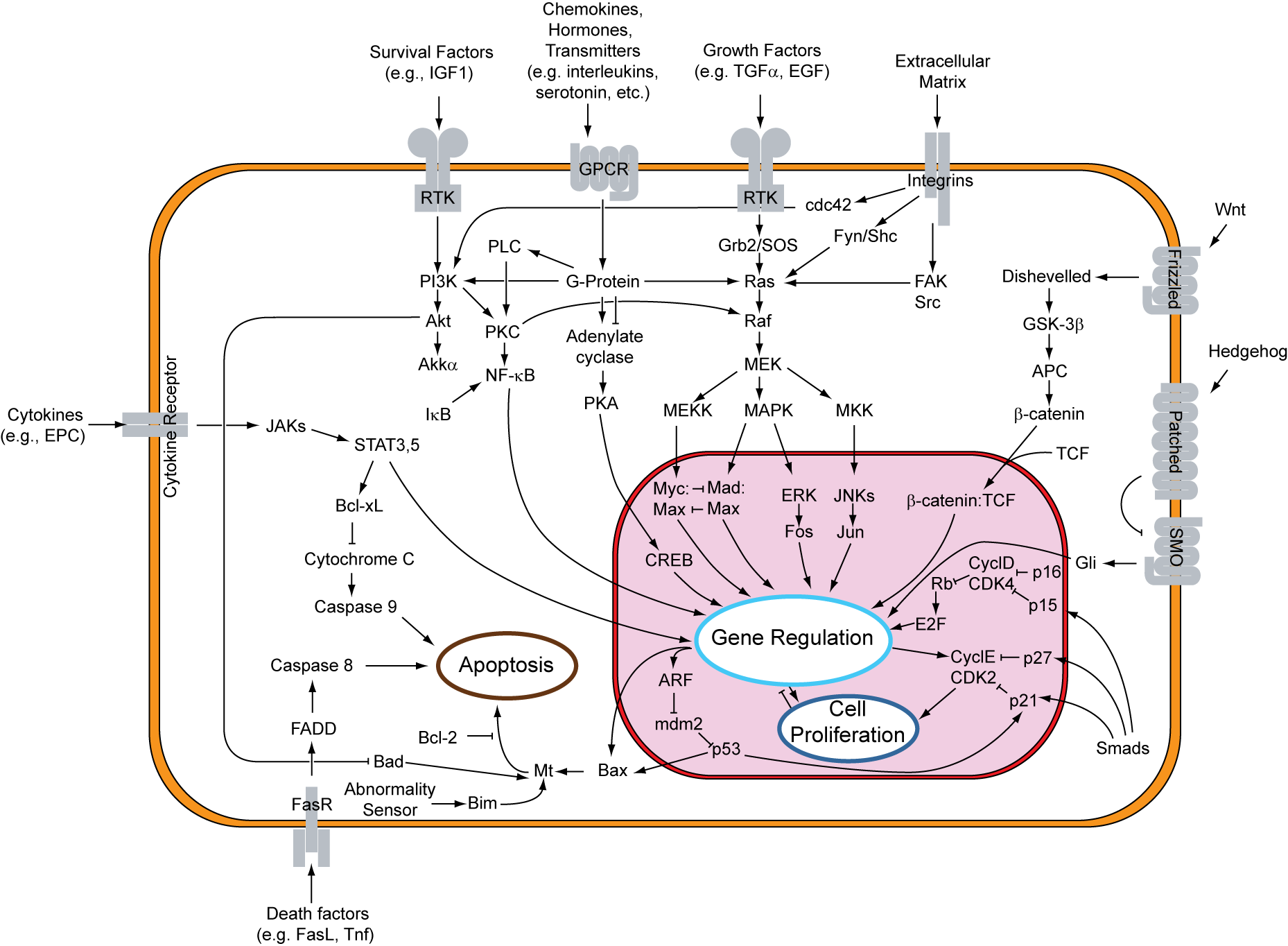
Overview of signal transduction pathways involved in apoptosis

== See also ==
- p53 - involved in the DNA repair support function of pRb
- Transcription coregulator
- Retinoblastoma
