= KAT8 regulatory NSL complex subunit 2 =

KANSL2
Available structures
PDB	Ortholog search: PDBe RCSB
PDB	List of PDB id codes 4CY2

Identifiers
- Aliases: KANSL2, C12orf41, NSL2, KAT8 regulatory NSL complex subunit 2
- External IDs: OMIM: 615488; MGI: 1916862; HomoloGene: 32367; GeneCards: KANSL2; OMA:KANSL2 - orthologs

Gene location (Human)
Chr.	Chromosome 12 (human)
Band	12q13.11	Start	48,653,211 bp
Band	12q13.11	End	48,682,238 bp

Gene location (Mouse)
Chr.	Chromosome 15 (mouse)
Band	15|15 F1	Start	98,415,539 bp
Band	15|15 F1	End	98,432,145 bp
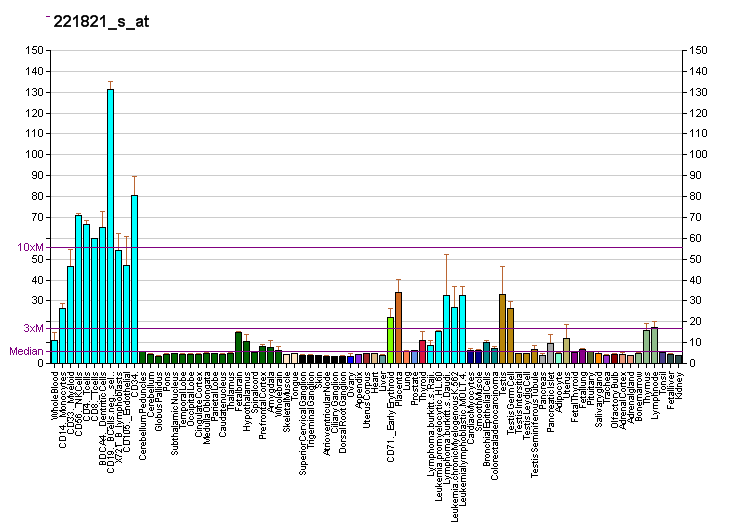
RNA expression pattern
Bgee	Human / Mouse (ortholog); Top expressed in: skeletal muscle tissue; bone marrow; gastrocnemius muscle; gonad; bone marrow cells; epithelium of colon; ganglionic eminence; granulocyte; ventricular zone; cerebellar hemisphere / Top expressed in: ventricular zone; muscle of thigh; neural layer of retina; embryo; embryo; neural tube; esophagus; lip; yolk sac; spermatocyte; More reference expression data
BioGPS	More reference expression data
Gene ontology
Molecular function	histone acetyltransferase activity (H4-K5 specific); histone acetyltransferase activity (H4-K16 specific); protein binding; histone acetyltransferase activity (H4-K8 specific)
Cellular component	histone acetyltransferase complex; nucleus; nucleoplasm; cytosol; plasma membrane; actin cytoskeleton; NSL complex
Biological process	histone H4-K16 acetylation; histone H4-K8 acetylation; histone H4-K5 acetylation; chromatin organization
Sources:Amigo / QuickGO
Orthologs
Species	Human	Mouse
Entrez	54934	69612
Ensembl	ENSG00000139620	ENSMUSG00000022992
UniProt	Q9H9L4	Q8BQR4
RefSeq (mRNA)	NM_017822	NM_001289437; NM_001289438; NM_001289439; NM_001289440; NM_133714 NM_001359827
RefSeq (protein)	NP_060292	NP_001276366; NP_001276367; NP_001276368; NP_001276369; NP_598475 NP_001346756
Location (UCSC)	Chr 12: 48.65 – 48.68 Mb	Chr 15: 98.42 – 98.43 Mb
PubMed search
- Wikidata
View/Edit Human	View/Edit Mouse

KAT8 regulatory NSL complex subunit 2 (KANSL2) also known as non-specific lethal 2 homolog (NSL2) is a protein that in humans is encoded by the KANSL2 gene.

== See also ==
- KAT8
- KAT8 regulatory NSL complex subunit 1
- KAT8 regulatory NSL complex subunit 3
