= KANSL3 =

Protein-coding gene in the species Homo sapiens

Identifiers
- Aliases: KANSL3, KIAA1310, NSL3, Rcd1, FLJ10081, KAT8 regulatory NSL complex subunit 3
- External IDs: OMIM: 617742; MGI: 1918055; HomoloGene: 9949; GeneCards: KANSL3; OMA:KANSL3 - orthologs

Gene location (Human)
Chr.	Chromosome 2 (human)
Band	2q11.2	Start	96,593,170 bp
Band	2q11.2	End	96,642,787 bp

Gene location (Mouse)
Chr.	Chromosome 1 (mouse)
Band	1|1 B	Start	36,374,811 bp
Band	1|1 B	End	36,408,262 bp
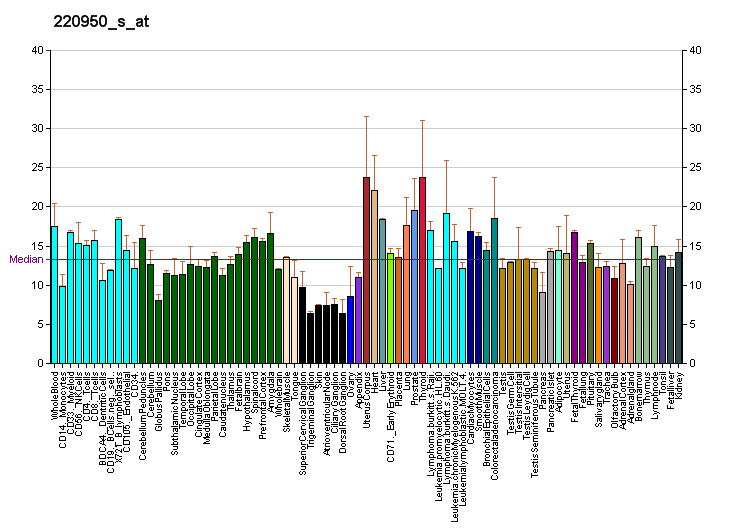
RNA expression pattern
Bgee	Human / Mouse (ortholog); Top expressed in: sperm; tibia; renal medulla; cardia; urethra; parietal pleura; tendon of biceps brachii; visceral pleura; pylorus; middle temporal gyrus / Top expressed in: spermatocyte; Rostral migratory stream; otolith organ; utricle; neural layer of retina; molar; spermatid; hand; habenula; seminiferous tubule; More reference expression data
BioGPS	More reference expression data
Gene ontology
Molecular function	histone acetyltransferase activity (H4-K5 specific); histone acetyltransferase activity (H4-K16 specific); histone acetyltransferase activity (H4-K8 specific)
Cellular component	histone acetyltransferase complex; nucleolus; intracellular membrane-bounded organelle; nucleus; nucleoplasm; NSL complex
Biological process	histone H4-K16 acetylation; histone H4-K8 acetylation; histone H4-K5 acetylation; chromatin organization
Sources:Amigo / QuickGO
Orthologs
Species	Human	Mouse
Entrez	55683	226976
Ensembl	ENSG00000114982	ENSMUSG00000010453
UniProt	Q9P2N6	A2RSY1
RefSeq (mRNA)	NM_001115016; NM_017991; NM_001349256; NM_001349257; NM_001349258 NM_001349259; NM_001349260; NM_001349261; NM_001349262	NM_172652; NM_001310513
RefSeq (protein)	NP_001108488; NP_001336185; NP_001336186; NP_001336187; NP_001336188 NP_001336189; NP_001336190; NP_001336191	NP_001297442; NP_766240
Location (UCSC)	Chr 2: 96.59 – 96.64 Mb	Chr 1: 36.37 – 36.41 Mb
PubMed search
- Wikidata
View/Edit Human	View/Edit Mouse

KANSL3, or KAT8 regulatory NSL complex subunit 3 is a protein that in humans is encoded by the KANSL3 gene.

== See also ==
- KAT8
- KAT8 regulatory NSL complex subunit 1
- KAT8 regulatory NSL complex subunit 2
