= E2F2 =

Protein-coding gene in humans

Identifiers
- Aliases: E2F2, E2F-2, E2F transcription factor 2
- External IDs: OMIM: 600426; MGI: 1096341; GeneCards: E2F2
Available structures
PDB	Ortholog search: PDBe RCSB
PDB	List of PDB id codes 1N4M

Gene location (Human)
Chr.	Chromosome 1 (human)
Band	1p36.12	Start	23,506,438 bp
Band	1p36.12	End	23,531,233 bp

Gene location (Mouse)
Chr.	Chromosome 4 (mouse)
Band	4|4 D3	Start	135,899,705 bp
Band	4|4 D3	End	135,923,368 bp
RNA expression pattern
Bgee	Human / Mouse (ortholog); Top expressed in: bone marrow; bone marrow cell; testicle; blood; gonad; mucosa of transverse colon; ganglionic eminence; ventricular zone; monocyte; granulocyte / Top expressed in: blood; granulocyte; thymus; otic vesicle; human fetus; zygote; spleen; primary oocyte; internal carotid artery; hair follicle; More reference expression data
BioGPS	n/a
Gene ontology
Molecular function	DNA-binding transcription factor activity; DNA binding; transcription factor binding; protein binding; protein dimerization activity; RNA polymerase II transcription regulatory region sequence-specific DNA binding; DNA-binding transcription activator activity, RNA polymerase II-specific; sequence-specific DNA binding; DNA-binding transcription factor activity, RNA polymerase II-specific; cis-regulatory region sequence-specific DNA binding; DNA-binding transcription repressor activity, RNA polymerase II-specific
Cellular component	nucleus; transcription regulator complex; nucleoplasm; RNA polymerase II transcription regulator complex
Biological process	regulation of cell cycle; cell cycle; transcription initiation from RNA polymerase II promoter; regulation of transcription, DNA-templated; lens fiber cell apoptotic process; intrinsic apoptotic signaling pathway by p53 class mediator; transcription, DNA-templated; positive regulation of transcription by RNA polymerase II; negative regulation of sprouting angiogenesis; negative regulation of transcription by RNA polymerase II
Sources:Amigo / QuickGO
Orthologs
Databases	NCBI: entry; OMA: entry
Species	Human	Mouse
Entrez	1870	242705
Ensembl	ENSG00000007968; ENSG00000282899	ENSMUSG00000018983
UniProt	Q14209	P56931
RefSeq (mRNA)	NM_004091	NM_177733; NM_183301; NM_001305399
RefSeq (protein)	NP_004082	NP_001292328; NP_808401
Location (UCSC)	Chr 1: 23.51 – 23.53 Mb	Chr 4: 135.9 – 135.92 Mb
PubMed search
- Wikidata
View/Edit Human	View/Edit Mouse

Transcription factor E2F2 is a protein that in humans is encoded by the E2F2 gene.

== Function ==
The protein encoded by this gene is a member of the E2F family of transcription factors. The E2F family plays a crucial role in the control of cell cycle and action of tumor suppressor proteins and is also a target of the transforming proteins of small DNA tumor viruses. The E2F proteins contain several evolutionally conserved domains found in most members of the family. These domains include a DNA binding domain, a dimerization domain which determines interaction with the differentiation regulated transcription factor proteins (DP), a transactivation domain enriched in acidic amino acids, and a tumor suppressor protein association domain which is embedded within the transactivation domain. This protein and another 2 members, E2F1 and E2F3, have an additional cyclin binding domain. This protein binds specifically to retinoblastoma protein pRB in a cell-cycle dependent manner, and it exhibits overall 46% amino acid identity to E2F1.

== Interactions ==
E2F2 has been shown to interact with:

- BRD2,
- RYBP, and
- RB1.

== See also ==
- E2F
