= LIN9 =

Protein-coding gene in humans

Identifiers
- Aliases: LIN9, BARA, BARPsv, Lin-9, TGS, TGS1, TGS2, lin-9 DREAM MuvB core complex component
- External IDs: OMIM: 609375; MGI: 1919818; GeneCards: LIN9

Gene location (Human)
Chr.	Chromosome 1 (human)
Band	1q42.12	Start	226,231,149 bp
Band	1q42.12	End	226,309,869 bp

Gene location (Mouse)
Chr.	Chromosome 1 (mouse)
Band	1|1 H4	Start	180,468,715 bp
Band	1|1 H4	End	180,518,259 bp
RNA expression pattern
Bgee	Human / Mouse (ortholog); Top expressed in: ventricular zone; gonad; ganglionic eminence; testicle; left ventricle; secondary oocyte; right ventricle; apex of heart; Achilles tendon; rectum / Top expressed in: spermatocyte; genital tubercle; tail of embryo; cumulus cell; epiblast; ventricular zone; zygote; maxillary prominence; spermatid; secondary oocyte; More reference expression data
BioGPS	n/a
Gene ontology
Molecular function	protein binding; DNA binding
Cellular component	transcription repressor complex; nucleus; nucleoplasm
Biological process	cell cycle; DNA biosynthetic process; transcription, DNA-templated; regulation of cell cycle; reproduction
Sources:Amigo / QuickGO
Orthologs
Databases	NCBI: entry; OMA: entry
Species	Human	Mouse
Entrez	286826	72568
Ensembl	ENSG00000183814	ENSMUSG00000058729
UniProt	Q5TKA1	Q8C735
RefSeq (mRNA)	NM_001270409; NM_001270410; NM_173083; NM_001366237; NM_001366238 NM_001366239; NM_001366240; NM_001366241; NM_001366245	NM_001103182; NM_175186
RefSeq (protein)	NP_001257338; NP_001257339; NP_775106; NP_001353166; NP_001353167 NP_001353168; NP_001353169; NP_001353170; NP_001353174	n/a
Location (UCSC)	Chr 1: 226.23 – 226.31 Mb	Chr 1: 180.47 – 180.52 Mb
PubMed search
- Wikidata
View/Edit Human	View/Edit Mouse

Lin-9 homolog is a protein that is encoded by the LIN9 gene in humans.

== Interactions ==
LIN9 has been shown to interact with the retinoblastoma protein.
