= HBP1 =

Protein-coding gene in the species Homo sapiens

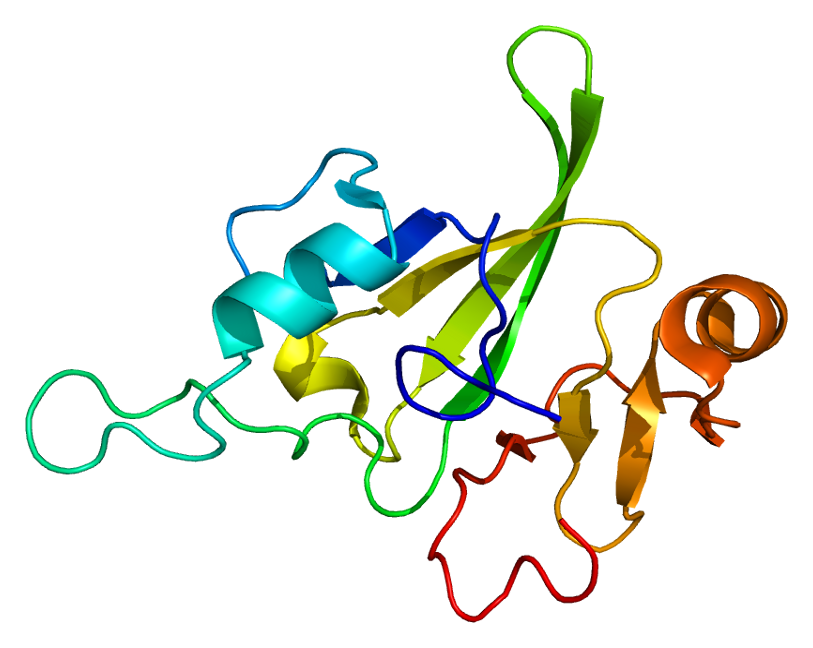

Identifiers
- Aliases: HBP1, HMG-box transcription factor 1
- External IDs: OMIM: 616714; MGI: 894659; GeneCards: HBP1
Available structures
PDB	Ortholog search: PDBe RCSB
PDB	List of PDB id codes 2E6O, 3QVE

Gene location (Human)
Chr.	Chromosome 7 (human)
Band	7q22.3	Start	107,168,961 bp
Band	7q22.3	End	107,202,522 bp

Gene location (Mouse)
Chr.	Chromosome 12 (mouse)
Band	12|12 A3	Start	31,976,253 bp
Band	12|12 A3	End	32,000,534 bp
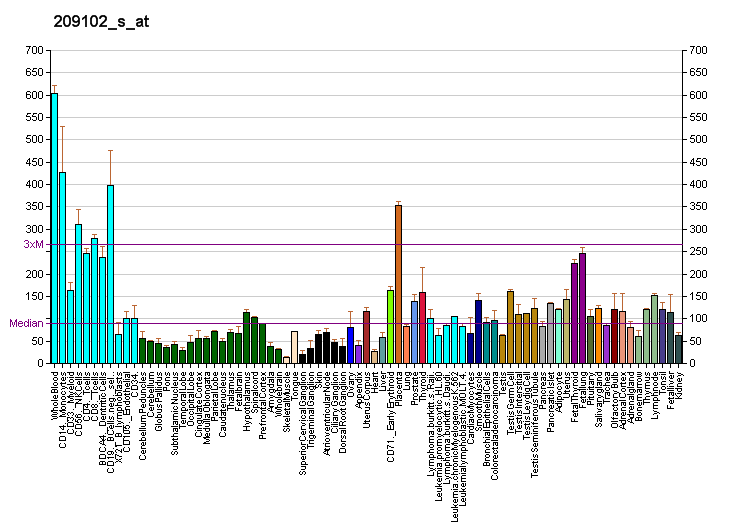
RNA expression pattern
Bgee	Human / Mouse (ortholog); Top expressed in: Achilles tendon; right lung; skin of leg; skin of abdomen; bone marrow cell; tibial arteries; left testis; left ovary; gastric mucosa; right testis / Top expressed in: interventricular septum; vestibular sensory epithelium; epithelium of lens; carotid body; Rostral migratory stream; granulocyte; gastrula; lacrimal gland; Gonadal ridge; muscle of thigh; More reference expression data
BioGPS	More reference expression data
Gene ontology
Molecular function	DNA binding; protein binding; RNA binding; DNA-binding transcription factor activity, RNA polymerase II-specific
Cellular component	nucleus; nucleoplasm; nuclear speck
Biological process	regulation of transcription, DNA-templated; Wnt signaling pathway; transcription, DNA-templated; regulation of transcription by RNA polymerase II
Sources:Amigo / QuickGO
Orthologs
Databases	NCBI: entry; OMA: entry
Species	Human	Mouse
Entrez	26959	73389
Ensembl	ENSG00000105856; ENSG00000283847	ENSMUSG00000002996
UniProt	O60381	Q8R316
RefSeq (mRNA)	NM_001244262; NM_012257	NM_153198; NM_177993; NM_001361928
RefSeq (protein)	NP_001231191; NP_036389	NP_694878; NP_818774; NP_001348857
Location (UCSC)	Chr 7: 107.17 – 107.2 Mb	Chr 12: 31.98 – 32 Mb
PubMed search
- Wikidata
View/Edit Human	View/Edit Mouse

HMG-box transcription factor 1, also known as HBP1, is a human protein.

== Interactions ==
HBP1 has been shown to interact with SIN3A and Retinoblastoma protein.
