= Koolen–De Vries syndrome =

Rare genetic disorder caused by a deletion of six genes

- Other names: 17q21.31 microdeletion syndrome
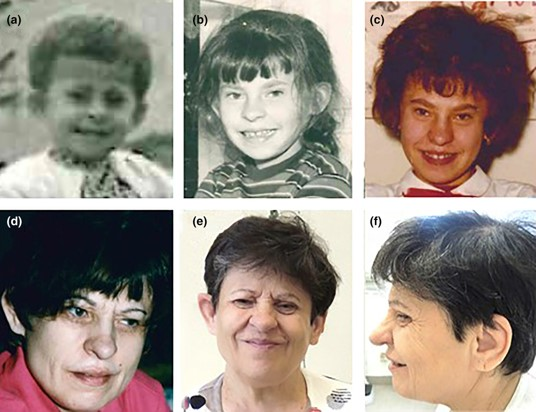
- Photo of the person with KdVS, with narrow and upslanted palpebral fissures, prominent ears and a pear-shaped nose.
- Symptoms: Intellectual disability, feeding problems, hypotonia
- Usual onset: Conception
- Duration: Lifelong
- Causes: Chromosomal microdeletion
- Diagnostic method: Fluorescence in situ hybridization

Koolen–De Vries syndrome (KdVS), also known as 17q21.31 microdeletion syndrome, is a rare genetic disorder that is often caused by a deletion of a segment of chromosome 17 which contains six genes (notably including KANSL1), but can also be caused by other mutations that affect the gene KANSL1. This deletion syndrome was discovered independently in 2006 by three different research groups.

== Presentation ==
The symptoms associated with this syndrome are variable, but common features include: low birthweight, low muscle tone at birth, poor feeding in infancy (often requiring feeding by tube for a period) and oromotor dyspraxia together with moderate developmental delays and learning disabilities but amiable behaviour. Other clinically important features include epilepsy, heart defects (atrial septal defect, ventricular septal defect) and kidney/urological anomalies. Silvery depigmentation of strands of hair have been noted in several patients. With age, there is an apparent coarsening of facial features.

17q21.3 was reported simultaneously in 2006 by three independent groups, with each group reporting several patients, and is now recognised to be one of the more common recurrent microdeletion syndromes. In 2007, a patient with a small duplication in same segment of DNA was described. An overview of the clinical features of the syndrome, by reviewing 22 individuals with a 17q21.31 microdeletion, estimated the disorder is present in 1 in every 16,000 people.

== Genetics ==
The recurrent deletion is between 500 and 650 kilobases (Kb) in size encompassing at least six genes, among them the microtubule-associated protein tau (MAPT). A review of five patients found the parental chromosome from which the deletion originated carried a common 900kb inversion polymorphism. The orientation of low copy repeats flanking the deleted segment suggests the inversion in the parental chromosome influences the deletion in the child's chromosome via a non-allelic homologous recombination (NAHR) mechanism.

=== Affected genes ===
The deletion that causes this disease can remove up to six different genes. These include:

- KAT8 regulatory NSL complex subunit 1 KANSL1 (previously known as KIAA1267)
- The protein SPPL2c, putative intramembrane-protease, member of the presenilin-homologues, the SPP/SPPL-proteases
- Corticotropin releasing hormone receptor 1 (CRHR1, also known as CRF-R, CRF1)
- Microtubule-associated protein tau (MAPT)
- Long Intergenic Non-Protein Coding RNA 2210: LINC02210 (previously known as C17orf69 or FLJ25168)

== Diagnosis ==
Diagnosis is established with a chromosome microarray analysis. The symptoms of Koolen–de Vries syndrome can be very variable, and there is no single clinical sign required to establish the diagnosis.

== Treatment ==
Treatment centres around the symptoms in each individual and can include: early physiotherapy for feeding and motor problems, physiotherapy for strengthening the muscles, speech therapy, sign language, alternative or augmentative communication devices, special education, routine antiepileptic medications, orthopaedic care for scoliosis, hip dislocation and positional deformities of the feet, treatment for cardiac, renal, urologic and other medical issues and surgery for cryptorchidism if indicated.

== History ==
The syndrome is named after Dutch geneticists David A. Koolen and Bert B. A. de Vries, who helped discover the syndrome in 2006.
