= MORF4L1 =

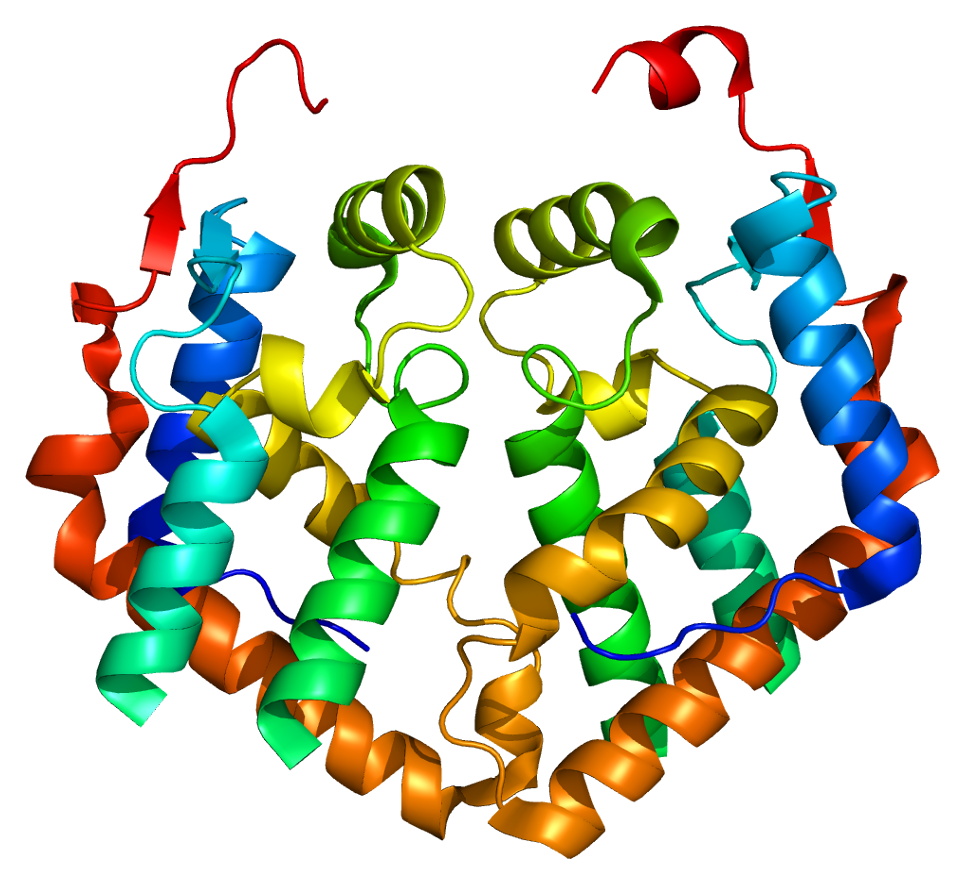

Identifiers
- Aliases: MORF4L1, Eaf3, HsT17725, MEAF3, MORFRG15, MRG15, S863-6, FWP006, mortality factor 4 like 1
- External IDs: OMIM: 607303; MGI: 1096551; GeneCards: MORF4L1
Available structures
PDB	Ortholog search: PDBe RCSB
PDB	List of PDB id codes 2AQL, 2EFI, 2F5J, 2F5K, 2LKM, 2N1D

Gene location (Human)
Chr.	Chromosome 15 (human)
Band	15q25.1	Start	78,810,487 bp
Band	15q25.1	End	78,898,139 bp

Gene location (Mouse)
Chr.	Chromosome 9 (mouse)
Band	9|9 E3.1	Start	89,973,718 bp
Band	9|9 E3.1	End	89,996,827 bp
RNA expression pattern
Bgee	Human / Mouse (ortholog); Top expressed in: lateral nuclear group of thalamus; Epithelium of choroid plexus; pars compacta; cerebellar vermis; pars reticulata; pons; tibia; germinal epithelium; secondary oocyte; caput epididymis / Top expressed in: tail of embryo; olfactory bulb; genital tubercle; hypothalamus; hippocampus proper; testicle; lung; yolk sac; neural tube; ventricular zone; More reference expression data
BioGPS	n/a
Gene ontology
Molecular function	protein N-terminus binding; protein binding; chromatin binding
Cellular component	nucleus; nucleoplasm; nuclear speck; Sin3 complex; NuA4 histone acetyltransferase complex; histone acetyltransferase complex
Biological process	chromatin remodeling; DNA recombination; regulation of transcription, DNA-templated; histone H2A acetylation; transcription, DNA-templated; cellular response to DNA damage stimulus; double-strand break repair via homologous recombination; histone H4 acetylation; regulation of growth; histone deacetylation; DNA repair; chromatin organization; cell population proliferation; histone acetylation
Sources:Amigo / QuickGO
Orthologs
Databases	NCBI: entry; OMA: entry
Species	Human	Mouse
Entrez	10933	21761
Ensembl	ENSG00000185787	ENSMUSG00000062270
UniProt	Q9UBU8	P60762
RefSeq (mRNA)	NM_206839; NM_001265603; NM_001265604; NM_001265605; NM_006791	NM_001039147; NM_024431; NM_001357780
RefSeq (protein)	NP_001252532; NP_001252533; NP_001252534; NP_006782; NP_996670	NP_001034236; NP_077751; NP_001344709
Location (UCSC)	Chr 15: 78.81 – 78.9 Mb	Chr 9: 89.97 – 90 Mb
PubMed search
- Wikidata
View/Edit Human	View/Edit Mouse

Mortality factor 4-like protein 1 is a protein that in humans is encoded by the MORF4L1 gene.

== Interactions ==
MORF4L1 has been shown to interact with MYST1, Retinoblastoma protein and MRFAP1.
