= PA2G4 =

Protein-coding gene in the species Homo sapiens

Identifiers
- Aliases: PA2G4, EBP1, HG4-1, p38-2G4, proliferation-associated 2G4
- External IDs: OMIM: 602145; MGI: 894684; GeneCards: PA2G4
Available structures
PDB	Ortholog search: PDBe RCSB
PDB	List of PDB id codes 2Q8K, 3J2I

Gene location (Human)
Chr.	Chromosome 12 (human)
Band	12q13.2	Start	56,104,537 bp
Band	12q13.2	End	56,113,910 bp

Gene location (Mouse)
Chr.	Chromosome 10 (mouse)
Band	10|10 D3	Start	128,393,635 bp
Band	10|10 D3	End	128,401,856 bp
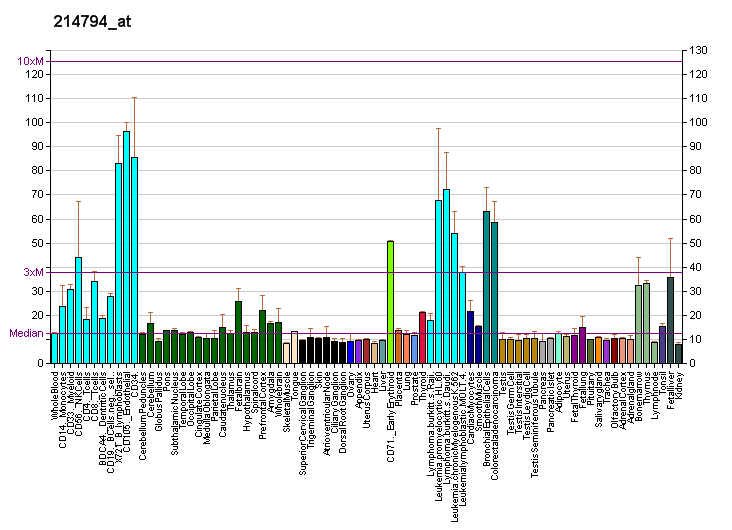

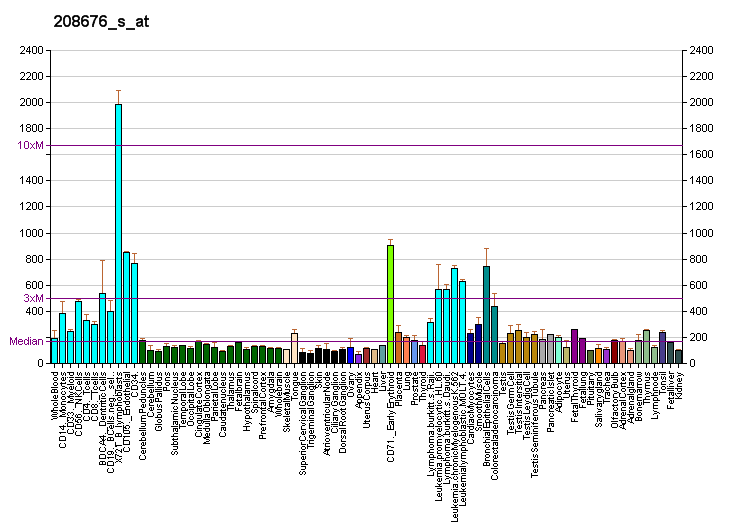
RNA expression pattern
Bgee	Human / Mouse (ortholog); Top expressed in: skin of leg; skin of abdomen; mucosa of esophagus; rectum; ganglionic eminence; islet of Langerhans; ventricular zone; tendon of biceps brachii; gastrocnemius muscle; body of pancreas / Top expressed in: tail of embryo; epiblast; morula; genital tubercle; somite; embryo; blastocyst; embryo; migratory enteric neural crest cell; abdominal wall; More reference expression data
BioGPS	More reference expression data
Gene ontology
Molecular function	DNA binding; DNA-binding transcription factor activity; protein binding; ubiquitin protein ligase binding; RNA binding; nucleic acid binding
Cellular component	cytoplasm; membrane; nucleolus; extracellular exosome; nucleus; extracellular region; azurophil granule lumen
Biological process	regulation of transcription, DNA-templated; transcription, DNA-templated; rRNA processing; cell population proliferation; negative regulation of transcription, DNA-templated; regulation of translation; neutrophil degranulation; negative regulation of apoptotic process; positive regulation of cell differentiation; ribosomal large subunit export from nucleus
Sources:Amigo / QuickGO
Orthologs
Databases	NCBI: entry; OMA: entry
Species	Human	Mouse
Entrez	5036	18813
Ensembl	ENSG00000170515	ENSMUSG00000025364
UniProt	Q9UQ80	P50580
RefSeq (mRNA)	NM_006191	NM_011119
RefSeq (protein)	NP_006182	NP_035249
Location (UCSC)	Chr 12: 56.1 – 56.11 Mb	Chr 10: 128.39 – 128.4 Mb
PubMed search
- Wikidata
View/Edit Human	View/Edit Mouse

Proliferation-associated protein 2G4 (PA2G4) also known as ErbB3-binding protein 1 (EBP1) is a protein that in humans is encoded by the PA2G4 gene.

== Function ==
This gene encodes an RNA-binding protein that is involved in growth regulation. This protein is present in pre-ribosomal ribonucleoprotein complexes and may be involved in ribosome assembly and the regulation of intermediate and late steps of rRNA processing. This protein can interact with the cytoplasmic domain of the ErbB3 receptor and may contribute to transducing growth regulatory signals. This protein is also a transcriptional corepressor of androgen receptor-regulated genes and other cell cycle regulatory genes through its interactions with histone deacetylases. This protein has been implicated in growth inhibition and the induction of differentiation of human cancer cells. Paradoxically, the expression of EBP1 is decreased in prostate cancer, but increased in Acute Myelogneous Leukemia. Six pseudogenes, located on chromosomes 3, 6, 9, 18, 20 and X, have been identified.

== Interactions ==
PA2G4 has been shown to interact with ERBB3, retinoblastoma protein, and androgen receptor.
