= RYBP =

Protein-coding gene in the species Homo sapiens

Identifiers
- Aliases: RYBP, AAP1, DEDAF, YEAF1, APAP-1, RING1 and YY1 binding protein
- External IDs: OMIM: 607535; MGI: 3648043; GeneCards: RYBP
Available structures
PDB	Human UniProt search: PDBe RCSB
PDB	List of PDB id codes 3IXS

Gene location (Human)
Chr.	Chromosome 3 (human)
Band	3p13	Start	72,371,825 bp
Band	3p13	End	72,446,621 bp
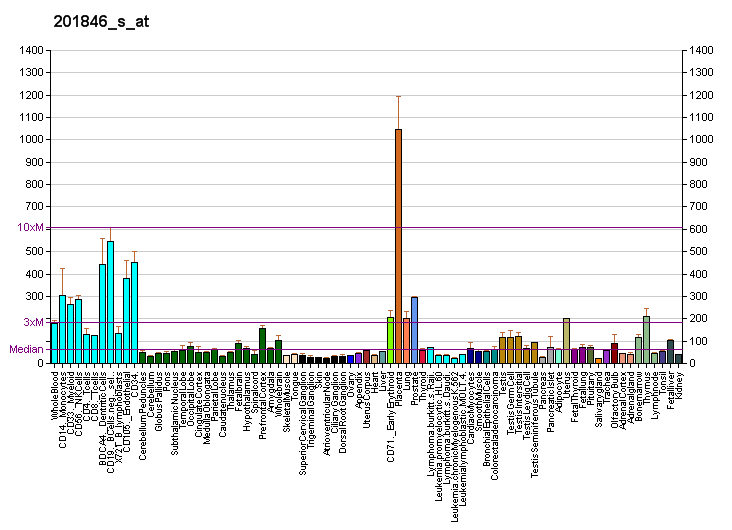

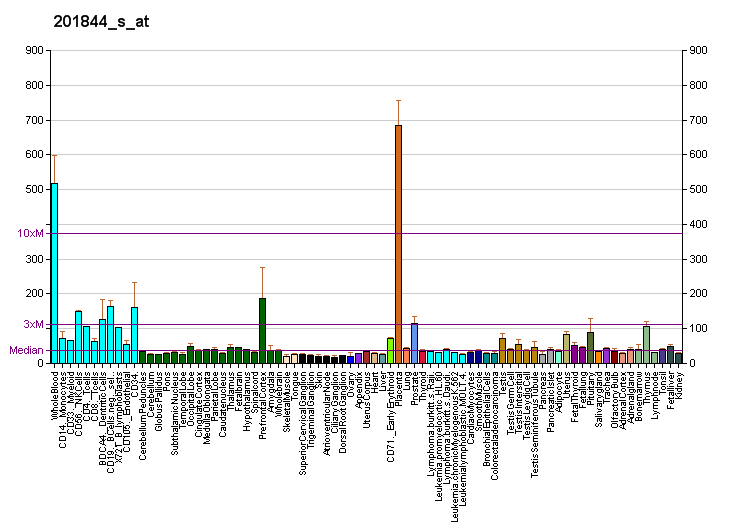

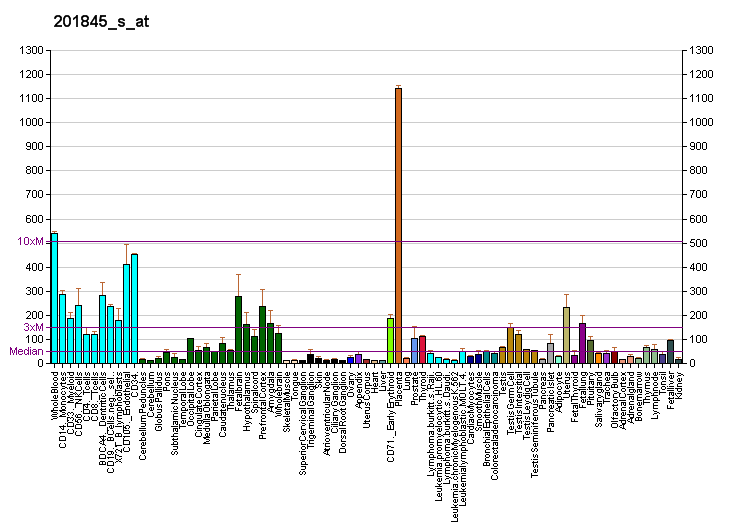
RNA expression pattern
Bgee	Human / Mouse (ortholog); Top expressed in: lower lobe of lung; cartilage tissue; endothelial cell; trabecular bone; urethra; Region I of hippocampus proper; middle frontal gyrus; optic nerve; placenta; inferior ganglion of vagus nerve / n/a; More reference expression data
BioGPS	More reference expression data
Gene ontology
Molecular function	DNA binding; protein binding; transcription corepressor activity; metal ion binding
Cellular component	cytoplasm; PcG protein complex; nucleus; nucleoplasm
Biological process	multicellular organism development; histone H2A monoubiquitination; regulation of transcription, DNA-templated; transcription, DNA-templated; apoptotic process; negative regulation of transcription by RNA polymerase II; negative regulation of proteasomal ubiquitin-dependent protein catabolic process; positive regulation of apoptotic process; positive regulation of transcription, DNA-templated; negative regulation of G0 to G1 transition
Sources:Amigo / QuickGO
Orthologs
Databases	NCBI: entry; OMA: entry
Species	Human	Mouse
Entrez	23429	628746
Ensembl	ENSG00000281766; ENSG00000163602	n/a
UniProt	Q8N488	n/a
RefSeq (mRNA)	NM_012234	XM_036158262
RefSeq (protein)	NP_036366	n/a
Location (UCSC)	Chr 3: 72.37 – 72.45 Mb	n/a
PubMed search
- Wikidata
View/Edit Human	View/Edit Mouse

RING1 and YY1-binding protein is a protein that in humans is encoded by the RYBP gene.

== Interactions ==
RYBP has been shown to interact with:

- Abl gene,
- CBX2,
- Caspase 10,
- E2F2,
- E2F3,
- Mdm2,
- RING1, and
- YY1.
