= ARID4A =

Protein-coding gene in humans

Identifiers
- Aliases: ARID4A, RBBP-1, RBBP1, RBP-1, RBP1, AT-rich interaction domain 4A
- External IDs: OMIM: 180201; MGI: 2444354; GeneCards: ARID4A
Available structures
PDB	Ortholog search: PDBe RCSB
PDB	List of PDB id codes 2LCC, 2MAM, 2YRV

Gene location (Human)
Chr.	Chromosome 14 (human)
Band	14q23.1	Start	58,298,504 bp
Band	14q23.1	End	58,373,887 bp

Gene location (Mouse)
Chr.	Chromosome 12 (mouse)
Band	12|12 C2	Start	71,015,990 bp
Band	12|12 C2	End	71,098,592 bp
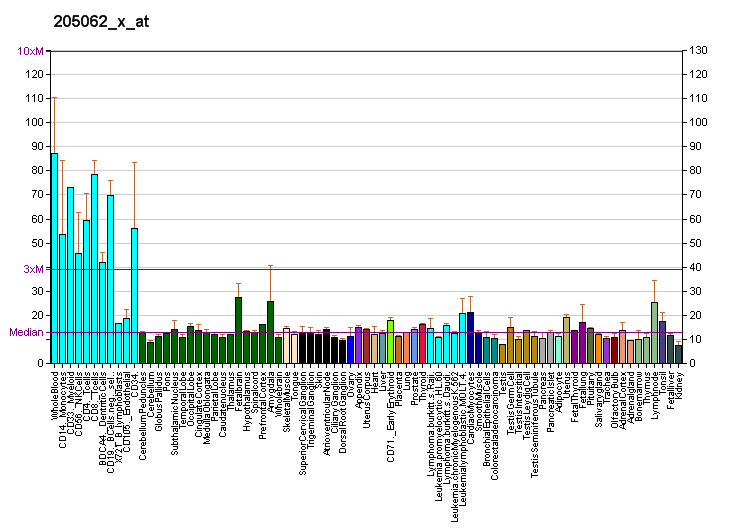
RNA expression pattern
Bgee	Human / Mouse (ortholog); Top expressed in: Achilles tendon; sural nerve; buccal mucosa cell; epithelium of colon; testicle; monocyte; ventricular zone; bone marrow cell; tendon of biceps brachii; ganglionic eminence / Top expressed in: zygote; tail of embryo; hand; granulocyte; secondary oocyte; genital tubercle; blood; aortic valve; ascending aorta; cumulus cell; More reference expression data
BioGPS	More reference expression data
Gene ontology
Molecular function	DNA-binding transcription factor activity; DNA binding; histone deacetylase activity; DNA-binding transcription factor activity, RNA polymerase II-specific
Cellular component	transcription repressor complex; nucleus; nucleoplasm; cytosol; plasma membrane
Biological process	histone H3-K9 trimethylation; establishment of Sertoli cell barrier; regulation of transcription, DNA-templated; regulation of gene expression by genetic imprinting; transcription by RNA polymerase II; positive regulation of transcription by RNA polymerase II; erythrocyte development; regulation of transcription by RNA polymerase II; spermatogenesis; histone H4-K20 trimethylation; histone H3-K4 trimethylation; transcription, DNA-templated; negative regulation of transcription, DNA-templated; histone deacetylation; chromatin organization; cell differentiation
Sources:Amigo / QuickGO
Orthologs
Databases	NCBI: entry; OMA: entry
Species	Human	Mouse
Entrez	5926	238247
Ensembl	ENSG00000032219	ENSMUSG00000048118
UniProt	P29374	F8VPQ2
RefSeq (mRNA)	NM_002892; NM_023000; NM_023001	NM_001081195
RefSeq (protein)	NP_002883; NP_075376; NP_075377	NP_001074664
Location (UCSC)	Chr 14: 58.3 – 58.37 Mb	Chr 12: 71.02 – 71.1 Mb
PubMed search
- Wikidata
View/Edit Human	View/Edit Mouse

AT rich interactive domain 4A (RBP1-like), also known as ARID4A, is a protein which in humans is encoded by the ARID4A gene.

== Function ==
The protein encoded by this gene is a ubiquitously expressed nuclear protein. It binds directly, with several other proteins, to retinoblastoma protein (pRB) which regulates cell proliferation. pRB represses transcription by recruiting the encoded protein. This protein, in turn, serves as a bridging molecule to recruit HDACs and, in addition, provides a second HDAC-independent repression function. The encoded protein possesses transcriptional repression activity. Multiple alternatively spliced transcripts have been observed for this gene, although not all transcript variants have been fully described.

== Interactions ==
ARID4A has been shown to interact with Retinoblastoma protein.
