= RBBP9 =

Protein-coding gene in the species Homo sapiens

Available structures
PDB	Ortholog search: PDBe RCSB
PDB	List of PDB id codes 2QS9

Identifiers
- Aliases: RBBP9, BOG, RBBP10, retinoblastoma binding protein 9, RB binding protein 9, serine hydrolase
- External IDs: OMIM: 602908; MGI: 1347074; HomoloGene: 4816; GeneCards: RBBP9; OMA:RBBP9 - orthologs

Gene location (Human)
Chr.	Chromosome 20 (human)
Band	20p11.23	Start	18,486,540 bp
Band	20p11.23	End	18,497,225 bp

Gene location (Mouse)
Chr.	Chromosome 2 (mouse)
Band	2|2 G1	Start	144,384,185 bp
Band	2|2 G1	End	144,392,789 bp
RNA expression pattern
Bgee	Human / Mouse (ortholog); Top expressed in: retinal pigment epithelium; olfactory zone of nasal mucosa; bronchial epithelial cell; ventricular zone; skin of thigh; ganglionic eminence; mucosa of paranasal sinus; stromal cell of endometrium; palpebral conjunctiva; endothelial cell / Top expressed in: vestibular sensory epithelium; right kidney; left lung lobe; tail of embryo; olfactory epithelium; epithelium of lens; seminal vesicula; genital tubercle; sciatic nerve; ventricular zone; More reference expression data
BioGPS	n/a
Gene ontology
Molecular function	protein binding; hydrolase activity
Cellular component	nucleus; nucleoplasm; cytoplasm
Biological process	regulation of cell population proliferation
Sources:Amigo / QuickGO
Orthologs
Species	Human	Mouse
Entrez	10741	26450
Ensembl	ENSG00000089050	ENSMUSG00000027428
UniProt	O75884	O88851
RefSeq (mRNA)	NM_006606; NM_153328	NM_015754
RefSeq (protein)	NP_006597	NP_056569
Location (UCSC)	Chr 20: 18.49 – 18.5 Mb	Chr 2: 144.38 – 144.39 Mb
PubMed search
- Wikidata
View/Edit Human	View/Edit Mouse

Putative hydrolase RBBP9 is an enzyme that in humans is encoded by the RBBP9 gene.

== Function ==
The protein encoded by this gene is a retinoblastoma binding protein that may play a role in the regulation of cell proliferation and differentiation. Two alternatively spliced transcript variants of this gene with identical predicted protein products have been reported, one of which is a nonsense-mediated decay candidate.

== Interactions ==
RBBP9 has been shown to interact with Retinoblastoma protein.
