= ENC1 =

Protein-coding gene in humans

Identifiers
- Aliases: ENC1, CCL28, ENC-1, KLHL35, KLHL37, NRPB, PIG10, TP53I10, ectodermal-neural cortex 1
- External IDs: OMIM: 605173; MGI: 109610; GeneCards: ENC1

Gene location (Human)
Chr.	Chromosome 5 (human)
Band	5q13.3	Start	74,627,406 bp
Band	5q13.3	End	74,641,424 bp

Gene location (Mouse)
Chr.	Chromosome 13 (mouse)
Band	13|13 D1	Start	97,241,105 bp
Band	13|13 D1	End	97,253,034 bp
RNA expression pattern
Bgee	Human / Mouse (ortholog); Top expressed in: Brodmann area 10; frontal pole; middle temporal gyrus; ganglionic eminence; orbitofrontal cortex; Brodmann area 46; superior frontal gyrus; Region I of hippocampus proper; ventricular zone; parietal lobe / Top expressed in: barrel cortex; medial ganglionic eminence; subiculum; anterior amygdaloid area; olfactory tubercle; prefrontal cortex; lateral septal nucleus; dorsal striatum; dentate gyrus of hippocampal formation granule cell; nucleus accumbens; More reference expression data
BioGPS	n/a
Gene ontology
Molecular function	actin binding; protein binding
Cellular component	cytoplasm; nuclear matrix; soma; Cul3-RING ubiquitin ligase complex; nucleolus; cytoskeleton; nucleus; nucleoplasm
Biological process	multicellular organism development; negative regulation of translation; proteasomal ubiquitin-independent protein catabolic process; protein ubiquitination; nervous system development; positive regulation of neuron projection development
Sources:Amigo / QuickGO
Orthologs
Databases	NCBI: entry; OMA: entry
Species	Human	Mouse
Entrez	8507	13803
Ensembl	ENSG00000171617	ENSMUSG00000041773
UniProt	O14682	O35709
RefSeq (mRNA)	NM_001256574; NM_001256575; NM_001256576; NM_003633	NM_007930
RefSeq (protein)	NP_001243503; NP_001243504; NP_001243505; NP_003624	NP_031956
Location (UCSC)	Chr 5: 74.63 – 74.64 Mb	Chr 13: 97.24 – 97.25 Mb
PubMed search
- Wikidata
View/Edit Human	View/Edit Mouse

Ectoderm-neural cortex protein 1 is a protein that in humans is encoded by the ENC1 gene.

== Function ==
DNA damage and/or hyperproliferative signals activate wildtype p53 tumor suppressor protein (TP53; MIM 191170), inducing cell cycle arrest or apoptosis. Mutations that inactivate p53 occur in 50% of all tumors. Polyak et al. (1997) used serial analysis of gene expression (SAGE) to evaluate cellular mRNA levels in a colorectal cancer cell line transfected with p53. Of 7,202 transcripts identified, only 14 were expressed at levels more than 10-fold higher in p53-expressing cells than in control cells. Polyak et al. (1997) termed these genes 'p53-induced genes,' or PIGs, several of which were predicted to encode redox-controlling proteins. They noted that reactive oxygen species (ROS) are potent inducers of apoptosis. Flow cytometric analysis showed that p53 expression induces ROS production, which increases as apoptosis progresses under some conditions. The authors stated that the PIG10 gene, also called ENC1, encodes an actin-binding protein.[supplied by OMIM]

== Interactions ==
ENC1 has been shown to interact with Retinoblastoma protein.
