= MOV10 =

Protein-coding gene in humans

Identifiers
- Aliases: MOV10, fSAP113, gb110, Mov10 RISC complex RNA helicase
- External IDs: OMIM: 610742; MGI: 97054; GeneCards: MOV10
Enzyme activity
EC #	BRENDA	ExPASy	KEGG	MetaCyc
5.6.2.5	↗	↗	↗	↗

Gene location (Human)
Chr.	Chromosome 1 (human)
Band	1p13.2	Start	112,673,141 bp
Band	1p13.2	End	112,700,756 bp

Gene location (Mouse)
Chr.	Chromosome 3 (mouse)
Band	3|3 F2.2	Start	104,702,152 bp
Band	3|3 F2.2	End	104,725,879 bp
RNA expression pattern
Bgee	Human / Mouse (ortholog); Top expressed in: right testis; left testis; right uterine tube; anterior pituitary; right lobe of liver; granulocyte; skin of arm; skin of abdomen; mucosa of transverse colon; right adrenal cortex / Top expressed in: blastocyst; granulocyte; tail of embryo; yolk sac; genital tubercle; gallbladder; duodenum; ankle joint; zygote; ileum; More reference expression data
BioGPS	n/a
Gene ontology
Molecular function	nucleotide binding; helicase activity; protein binding; hydrolase activity; ATP binding; RNA binding; 5'-3' RNA helicase activity
Cellular component	cytoplasm; P-body; extracellular space; cytosol; nucleus; cytoplasmic stress granule; cytoplasmic ribonucleoprotein granule; P granule
Biological process	regulation of transcription, DNA-templated; transcription, DNA-templated; mRNA destabilization-mediated gene silencing by miRNA; gene silencing; Wnt signaling pathway, calcium modulating pathway; gene silencing by miRNA; regulation of megakaryocyte differentiation; negative regulation of transposition, RNA-mediated; positive regulation of gene expression; negative regulation of gene expression; RNA interference; positive regulation of mRNA catabolic process; 3'-UTR-mediated mRNA destabilization; regulation of neuron projection arborization
Sources:Amigo / QuickGO
Orthologs
Databases	NCBI: entry; OMA: entry
Species	Human	Mouse
Entrez	4343	17454
Ensembl	ENSG00000155363	ENSMUSG00000002227
UniProt	Q9HCE1	P23249
RefSeq (mRNA)	NM_001130079; NM_001286072; NM_020963; NM_001321324; NM_001369507 NM_001389562; NM_001389563	NM_001163440; NM_001163441; NM_008619
RefSeq (protein)	NP_001123551; NP_001273001; NP_001308253; NP_066014; NP_001356436	NP_001156912; NP_001156913; NP_032645
Location (UCSC)	Chr 1: 112.67 – 112.7 Mb	Chr 3: 104.7 – 104.73 Mb
PubMed search
- Wikidata
View/Edit Human	View/Edit Mouse

Putative helicase MOV-10 is an enzyme that in humans is encoded by the MOV10 gene. Stability of MOV10 protein is controlled via DCAF12 ubiquitin ligase.
