= PHF20 =

Protein-coding gene in the species Homo sapiens

Identifiers
- Aliases: PHF20, C20orf104, GLEA2, HCA58, NZF, TDRD20A, TZP, PHD finger protein 20
- External IDs: OMIM: 610335; MGI: 2444148; GeneCards: PHF20
Available structures
| PDB | Ortholog search: PDBe RCSB |
| PDB | List of PDB id codes 3P8D, 3Q1J, 3QII, 3SD4 |

Gene location (Human)
| Chr. | Chromosome 20 (human) |
| Band | 20q11.22-q11.23 | Start | 35,771,974 bp |
| Band | 20q11.22-q11.23 | End | 35,950,370 bp |

Gene location (Mouse)
| Chr. | Chromosome 2 (mouse) |
| Band | 2|2 H1 | Start | 156,196,466 bp |
| Band | 2|2 H1 | End | 156,309,952 bp |
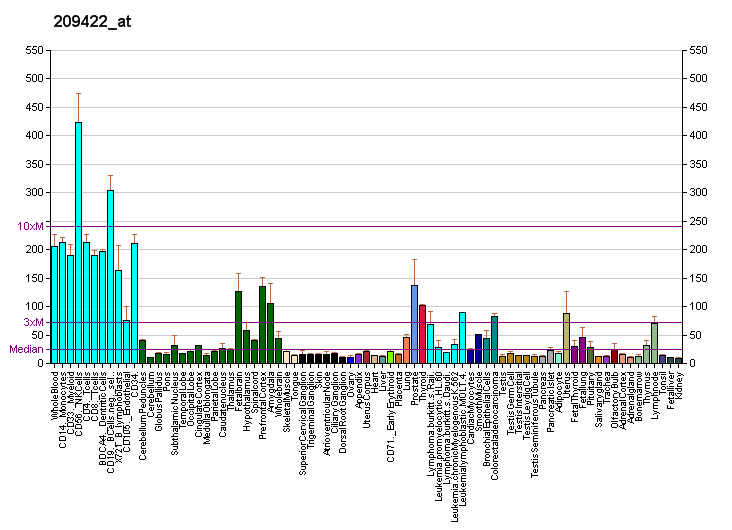

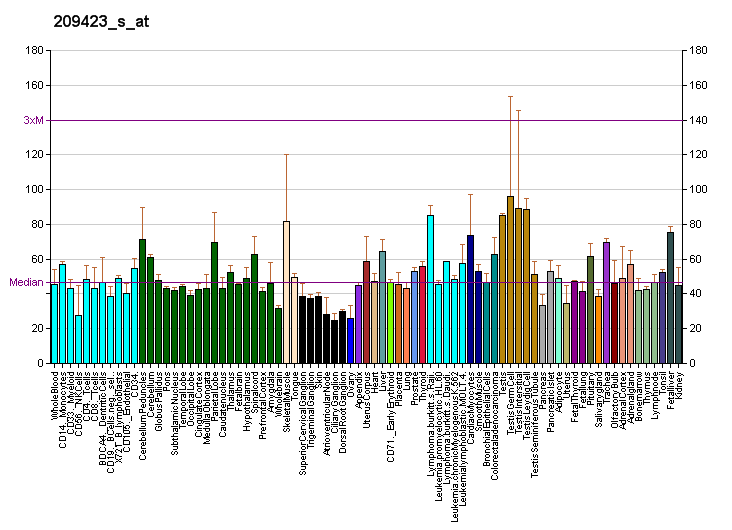

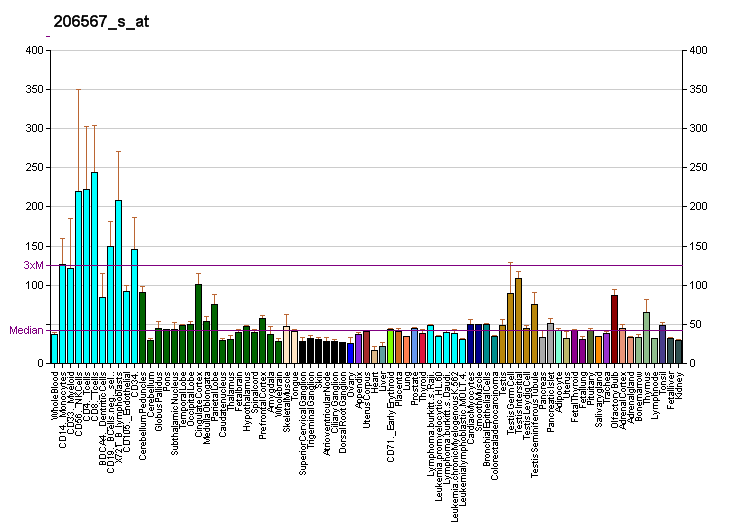
RNA expression pattern
| Bgee | Human / Mouse (ortholog); Top expressed in: endothelial cell; sperm; epithelium of colon; Achilles tendon; Brodmann area 23; germinal epithelium; amniotic fluid; glutes; visceral pleura; parietal pleura / Top expressed in: zygote; ectoderm; otic placode; otic vesicle; saccule; primary oocyte; secondary oocyte; Region I of hippocampus proper; cerebellar vermis; lobe of cerebellum; More reference expression data |
| BioGPS | More reference expression data |
Gene ontology
| Molecular function | histone acetyltransferase activity (H4-K8 specific); DNA binding; histone acetyltransferase activity (H4-K5 specific); metal ion binding; histone acetyltransferase activity (H4-K16 specific); protein binding; nucleic acid binding; DNA-binding transcription factor activity, RNA polymerase II-specific |
| Cellular component | nuclear membrane; histone acetyltransferase complex; nucleus; nucleoplasm; cytosol; MLL1 complex |
| Biological process | histone H4-K16 acetylation; regulation of transcription, DNA-templated; transcription, DNA-templated; histone H4-K5 acetylation; histone H4-K8 acetylation; regulation of signal transduction by p53 class mediator; chromatin organization; regulation of transcription by RNA polymerase II |
Sources:Amigo / QuickGO
Orthologs
| Databases | NCBI: entry; OMA: entry |
| Species | Human | Mouse |
| Entrez | 51230 | 228829 |
| Ensembl | ENSG00000025293 | ENSMUSG00000038116 |
| UniProt | Q9BVI0; Q5JWZ0 | Q8BLG0 |
| RefSeq (mRNA) | NM_016436 | NM_172674 |
| RefSeq (protein) | NP_057520 | NP_766262 |
| Location (UCSC) | Chr 20: 35.77 – 35.95 Mb | Chr 2: 156.2 – 156.31 Mb |
| PubMed search |
- Wikidata
| View/Edit Human | View/Edit Mouse |

PHD finger protein 20 is a protein that in humans is encoded by the PHF20 gene.
