= PRCC (gene) =

Protein-coding gene in humans

Identifiers
- Aliases: PRCC, RCCP1, TPRC, papillary renal cell carcinoma (translocation-associated), proline rich mitotic checkpoint control factor
- External IDs: OMIM: 179755; MGI: 2137738; GeneCards: PRCC

Gene location (Human)
| Chr. | Chromosome 1 (human) |
| Band | 1q23.1 | Start | 156,750,610 bp |
| Band | 1q23.1 | End | 156,800,815 bp |

Gene location (Mouse)
| Chr. | Chromosome 3 (mouse) |
| Band | 3|3 F1 | Start | 87,766,210 bp |
| Band | 3|3 F1 | End | 87,792,915 bp |
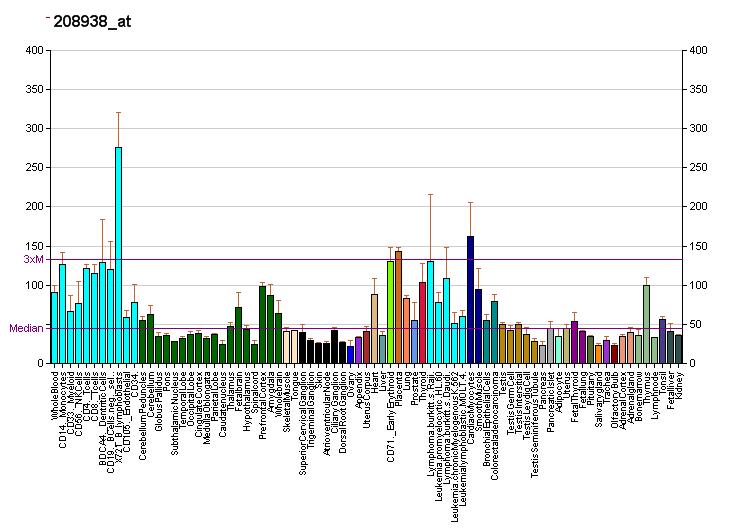
RNA expression pattern
| Bgee | Human / Mouse (ortholog); Top expressed in: ganglionic eminence; ventricular zone; right hemisphere of cerebellum; right frontal lobe; skin of leg; right lobe of thyroid gland; muscle of thigh; skin of abdomen; gastrocnemius muscle; stromal cell of endometrium / Top expressed in: ventricular zone; muscle of thigh; yolk sac; lip; neural layer of retina; tail of embryo; genital tubercle; choroid plexus of fourth ventricle; granulocyte; dentate gyrus of hippocampal formation granule cell; More reference expression data |
| BioGPS | More reference expression data |
Gene ontology
| Molecular function | protein binding |
| Cellular component | nucleus; nucleoplasm; nuclear speck |
| Biological process | cell cycle; mitotic cell cycle checkpoint signaling; mRNA splicing, via spliceosome |
Sources:Amigo / QuickGO
Orthologs
| Databases | NCBI: entry; OMA: entry |
| Species | Human | Mouse |
| Entrez | 5546 | 94315 |
| Ensembl | ENSG00000143294 | ENSMUSG00000004895 |
| UniProt | Q92733 | Q9EQC8 |
| RefSeq (mRNA) | NM_005973; NM_199416 | NM_033573 |
| RefSeq (protein) | NP_005964 | NP_291051 |
| Location (UCSC) | Chr 1: 156.75 – 156.8 Mb | Chr 3: 87.77 – 87.79 Mb |
| PubMed search |
- Wikidata
| View/Edit Human | View/Edit Mouse |

Proline-rich protein PRCC is a protein that, in humans, is encoded by the PRCC gene.

In a subset of renal cell carcinomas, a t(X;1)(p11;q21) chromosome translocation has been repeatedly reported and is thought to be the cause of the cancer. As a result of the translocation, the transcription factor TFE3 on the X chromosome becomes fused to this gene on chromosome 1. The fused gene results in the fusion of N-terminal proline-rich region of the protein encoded by this gene to the entire TFE3 protein. This protein has been shown to interact with the mitotic checkpoint protein MAD2B, which suggests that the dominant-negative effect of the fusion protein with TFE3 may lead to a mitotic checkpoint defect. Alternatively spliced transcript variants encoding distinct isoforms have been observed.
