= MRFAP1 =

Protein-coding gene in the species Homo sapiens

Identifiers
- Aliases: MRFAP1, PAM14, PGR1, Morf4 family associated protein 1, PGR1`
- External IDs: OMIM: 616905; MGI: 1914818; HomoloGene: 128357; GeneCards: MRFAP1; OMA:MRFAP1 - orthologs

Gene location (Human)
Chr.	Chromosome 4 (human)
Band	4p16.1	Start	6,640,091 bp
Band	4p16.1	End	6,642,729 bp

Gene location (Mouse)
Chr.	Chromosome 5 (mouse)
Band	5|5 B3	Start	36,952,211 bp
Band	5|5 B3	End	36,954,116 bp
RNA expression pattern
Bgee	Human / Mouse (ortholog); Top expressed in: endothelial cell; pancreatic epithelial cell; Brodmann area 23; parietal pleura; middle temporal gyrus; visceral pleura; germinal epithelium; pons; postcentral gyrus; superior vestibular nucleus / Top expressed in: hippocampus proper; olfactory bulb; epiblast; adrenal gland; islet of Langerhans; ventricular zone; hypothalamus; uterus; placenta; lens; More reference expression data
BioGPS	n/a
Orthologs
Species	Human	Mouse
Entrez	93621	67568
Ensembl	ENSG00000179010	ENSMUSG00000055302
UniProt	Q9Y605	Q9CQL7
RefSeq (mRNA)	NM_033296; NM_001272053; NM_001272054	NM_026242
RefSeq (protein)	NP_001258982; NP_001258983; NP_150638	NP_080518
Location (UCSC)	Chr 4: 6.64 – 6.64 Mb	Chr 5: 36.95 – 36.95 Mb
PubMed search
- Wikidata
View/Edit Human	View/Edit Mouse

MORF4 family-associated protein 1 is a protein that in humans is encoded by the MRFAP1 gene.

== Interactions ==
MRFAP1 has been shown to interact with MORF4L1 and Retinoblastoma protein.
