= E2F3 =

Protein-coding gene in the species Homo sapiens

Identifiers
- Aliases: E2F3, E2F-3, E2F transcription factor 3
- External IDs: OMIM: 600427; MGI: 1096340; GeneCards: E2F3

Gene location (Human)
Chr.	Chromosome 6 (human)
Band	6p22.3	Start	20,401,879 bp
Band	6p22.3	End	20,493,714 bp

Gene location (Mouse)
Chr.	Chromosome 13 (mouse)
Band	13|13 A3.2	Start	30,090,558 bp
Band	13|13 A3.2	End	30,170,046 bp
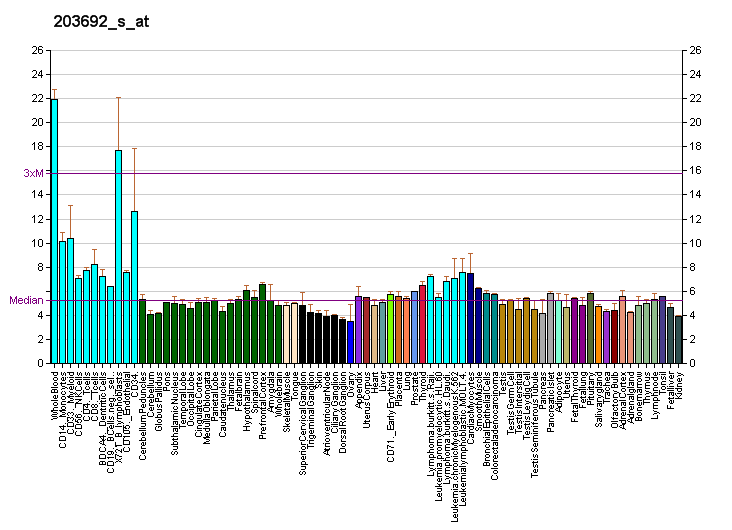
RNA expression pattern
Bgee	Human / Mouse (ortholog); Top expressed in: buccal mucosa cell; Brodmann area 23; middle temporal gyrus; endothelial cell; tendon of biceps brachii; gingival epithelium; tibia; cartilage tissue; visceral pleura; bone marrow / Top expressed in: primitive streak; mandibular prominence; maxillary prominence; cumulus cell; medullary collecting duct; abdominal wall; atrium; tail of embryo; hair follicle; genital tubercle; More reference expression data
BioGPS	More reference expression data
Gene ontology
Molecular function	DNA-binding transcription factor activity; DNA binding; protein binding; protein dimerization activity; RNA polymerase II transcription regulatory region sequence-specific DNA binding; DNA-binding transcription activator activity, RNA polymerase II-specific; sequence-specific DNA binding; DNA-binding transcription factor activity, RNA polymerase II-specific; cis-regulatory region sequence-specific DNA binding; DNA-binding transcription repressor activity, RNA polymerase II-specific; transcription factor binding
Cellular component	nucleus; transcription regulator complex; RNA polymerase II transcription regulator complex; nucleoplasm
Biological process	positive regulation of transcription, DNA-templated; negative regulation of fat cell proliferation; cell cycle; transcription initiation from RNA polymerase II promoter; regulation of transcription, DNA-templated; transcription, DNA-templated; positive regulation of cell population proliferation; positive regulation of transcription by RNA polymerase II; positive regulation of vascular associated smooth muscle cell apoptotic process; negative regulation of transcription by RNA polymerase II; regulation of cell cycle
Sources:Amigo / QuickGO
Orthologs
Databases	NCBI: entry; OMA: entry
Species	Human	Mouse
Entrez	1871	13557
Ensembl	ENSG00000112242	ENSMUSG00000016477
UniProt	O00716	O35261
RefSeq (mRNA)	NM_001243076; NM_001949	NM_001289920; NM_010093; NM_001359994
RefSeq (protein)	NP_001230005; NP_001940	NP_001276849; NP_034223; NP_001346923
Location (UCSC)	Chr 6: 20.4 – 20.49 Mb	Chr 13: 30.09 – 30.17 Mb
PubMed search
- Wikidata
View/Edit Human	View/Edit Mouse

Transcription factor E2F3 is a protein that in humans is encoded by the E2F3 gene.

== Function ==
The protein encoded by this gene is a member of the E2F family of transcription factors. The E2F family plays a crucial role in the control of cell cycle and action of tumor suppressor proteins and is also a target of the transforming proteins of small DNA tumor viruses. The E2F proteins contain several evolutionally conserved domains found in most members of the family. These domains include a DNA binding domain, a dimerization domain which determines interaction with the differentiation regulated transcription factor proteins (DP), a transactivation domain enriched in acidic amino acids, and a tumor suppressor protein association domain which is embedded within the transactivation domain. This protein and another 2 members, E2F1 and E2F2, have an additional cyclin binding domain. This protein binds specifically to retinoblastoma protein pRB in a cell-cycle dependent manner. Alternative gene splicing is found in the mouse homolog, but has not reported in human yet.

== Interactions ==
E2F3 has been shown to interact with TFE3, IGF2. and RYBP.

== See also ==
- E2F
