= TFE3 =

Protein-coding gene in the species Homo sapiens

Identifiers
- Aliases: TFE3, RCCP2, RCCX1, TFEA, bHLHe33, transcription factor binding to IGHM enhancer 3, MRXSPF
- External IDs: OMIM: 314310; MGI: 98511; GeneCards: TFE3

Gene location (Human)
Chr.	X chromosome (human)
Band	Xp11.23	Start	49,028,726 bp
Band	Xp11.23	End	49,043,410 bp

Gene location (Mouse)
Chr.	X chromosome (mouse)
Band	X A1.1|X 3.5 cM	Start	7,628,799 bp
Band	X A1.1|X 3.5 cM	End	7,641,441 bp
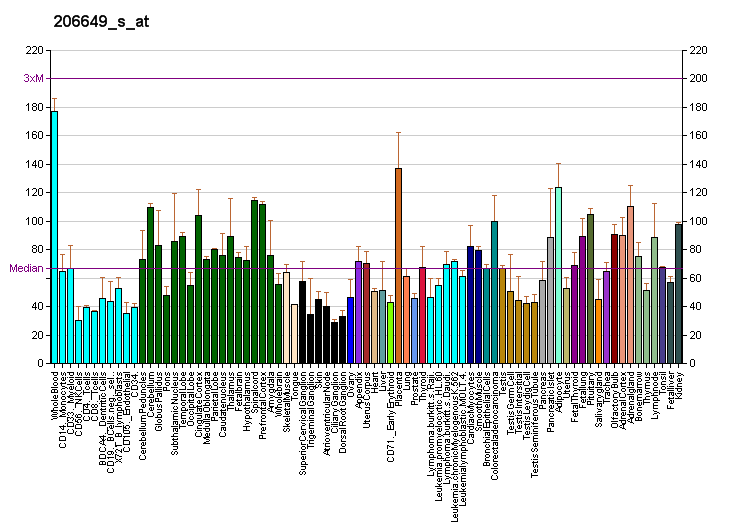

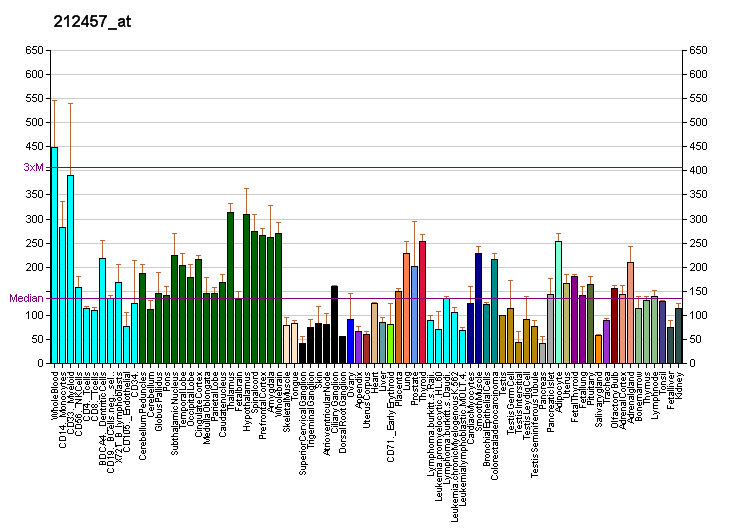
RNA expression pattern
Bgee	Human / Mouse (ortholog); Top expressed in: inferior olivary nucleus; dorsal motor nucleus of vagus nerve; olfactory bulb; seminal vesicula; stromal cell of endometrium; secondary oocyte; left uterine tube; cartilage tissue; external globus pallidus; right adrenal cortex / Top expressed in: zygote; granulocyte; secondary oocyte; primary oocyte; thin ascending limb of loop of Henle; molar; epiblast; cumulus cell; ankle; yolk sac; More reference expression data
BioGPS	More reference expression data
Gene ontology
Molecular function	RNA polymerase II cis-regulatory region sequence-specific DNA binding; DNA-binding transcription factor activity; protein dimerization activity; DNA binding; DNA-binding transcription activator activity, RNA polymerase II-specific; protein binding; DNA-binding transcription factor activity, RNA polymerase II-specific
Cellular component	nucleoplasm; nucleus; cytosol
Biological process	positive regulation of cell adhesion; transcription, DNA-templated; transcription by RNA polymerase II; regulation of transcription, DNA-templated; adaptive immune response; regulation of osteoclast differentiation; immune system process; positive regulation of transcription, DNA-templated; positive regulation of transcription by RNA polymerase II; humoral immune response; negative regulation of cold-induced thermogenesis
Sources:Amigo / QuickGO
Orthologs
Databases	NCBI: entry; OMA: entry
Species	Human	Mouse
Entrez	7030	209446
Ensembl	ENSG00000068323	ENSMUSG00000000134
UniProt	P19532	Q64092
RefSeq (mRNA)	NM_001282142; NM_006521	NM_001105196; NM_001105197; NM_001271489; NM_001271490; NM_001271491 NM_172472
RefSeq (protein)	NP_001269071; NP_006512	NP_001098666; NP_001098667; NP_001258418; NP_001258419; NP_001258420 NP_766060
Location (UCSC)	Chr X: 49.03 – 49.04 Mb	Chr X: 7.63 – 7.64 Mb
PubMed search
- Wikidata
View/Edit Human	View/Edit Mouse

Transcription factor E3 is a protein that in humans is encoded by the TFE3 gene.

== Function ==
TFE3, a member of the helix-loop-helix family of transcription factors, binds to the mu-E3 motif of the immunoglobulin heavy-chain enhancer and is expressed in many cell types (Henthorn et al., 1991).[supplied by OMIM]

== Interactions ==
TFE3 has been shown to interact with:

- E2F3,
- Microphthalmia-associated transcription factor, and
- Mothers against decapentaplegic homolog 3

== Translocations ==
A proportion of renal carcinomas (RCC) that occur in young patients are associated with translocations involving the TFE3 gene at chromosome Xp11.2 PRCC
