= KAT8 =

Protein-coding gene in the species Homo sapiens

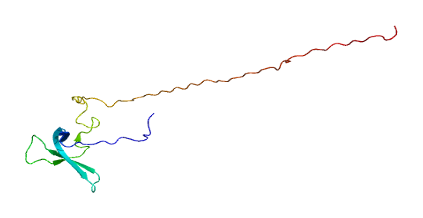

Identifiers
- Aliases: KAT8, MOF, MYST1, ZC2HC8, hMOF, lysine acetyltransferase 8, LIGOWS
- External IDs: OMIM: 609912; MGI: 1915023; GeneCards: KAT8
Available structures
PDB	Ortholog search: PDBe RCSB
PDB	List of PDB id codes 2GIV, 2PQ8, 2Y0M, 3QAH, 3TOA, 3TOB, 4DNC
Enzyme activity
EC #	BRENDA	ExPASy	KEGG	MetaCyc
2.3.1.48	↗	↗	↗	↗

Gene location (Human)
Chr.	Chromosome 16 (human)
Band	16p11.2	Start	31,114,489 bp
Band	16p11.2	End	31,131,393 bp

Gene location (Mouse)
Chr.	Chromosome 7 (mouse)
Band	7 F3|7 69.83 cM	Start	127,511,688 bp
Band	7 F3|7 69.83 cM	End	127,525,009 bp
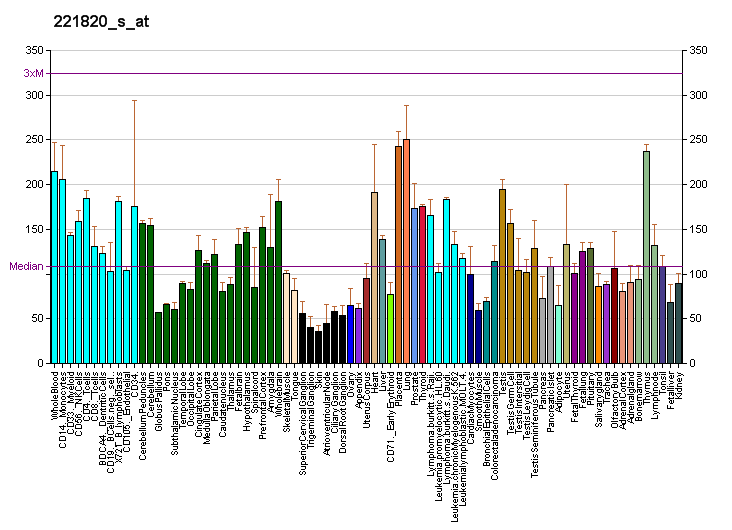

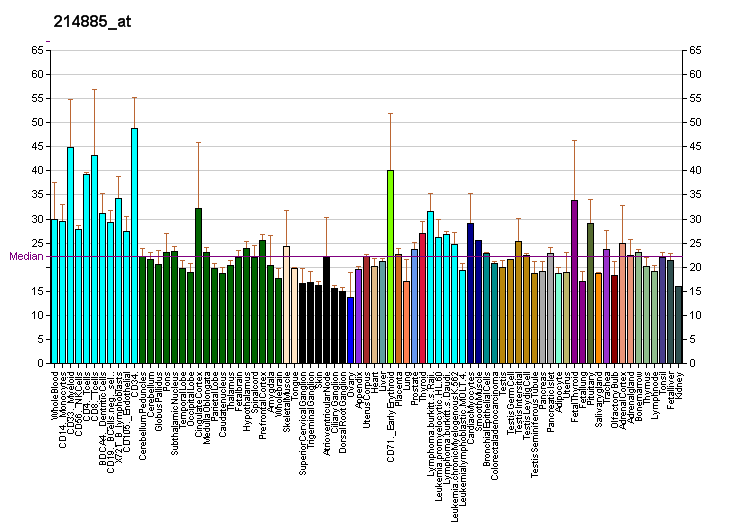
RNA expression pattern
Bgee	Human / Mouse (ortholog); Top expressed in: cerebellar hemisphere; right hemisphere of cerebellum; right ovary; left ovary; corpus epididymis; cerebellar vermis; paraflocculus of cerebellum; left uterine tube; external globus pallidus; apex of heart / Top expressed in: seminiferous tubule; spermatocyte; spermatid; primary oocyte; neural layer of retina; hand; muscle of thigh; otolith organ; tail of embryo; utricle; More reference expression data
BioGPS	More reference expression data
Gene ontology
Molecular function	transferase activity; transcription factor binding; metal ion binding; histone acetyltransferase activity (H4-K8 specific); histone acetyltransferase activity; histone acetyltransferase activity (H4-K5 specific); methylated histone binding; protein binding; histone acetyltransferase activity (H4-K16 specific); enzyme binding; acetyltransferase activity; acyltransferase activity; histone binding
Cellular component	nucleoplasm; chromosome; MLL1 complex; histone acetyltransferase complex; nucleus; kinetochore; MSL complex; nuclear matrix
Biological process	myeloid cell differentiation; regulation of transcription, DNA-templated; transcription, DNA-templated; histone H4-K5 acetylation; positive regulation of transcription, DNA-templated; regulation of autophagy; histone H4-K16 acetylation; negative regulation of transcription, DNA-templated; histone H4-K8 acetylation; histone acetylation; chromatin organization; positive regulation of transcription by RNA polymerase II
Sources:Amigo / QuickGO
Orthologs
Databases	NCBI: entry; OMA: entry
Species	Human	Mouse
Entrez	84148	67773
Ensembl	ENSG00000103510	ENSMUSG00000030801
UniProt	Q9H7Z6	Q9D1P2
RefSeq (mRNA)	NM_032188; NM_182958	NM_026370; NM_001360699
RefSeq (protein)	NP_115564; NP_892003	NP_080646; NP_001347628
Location (UCSC)	Chr 16: 31.11 – 31.13 Mb	Chr 7: 127.51 – 127.53 Mb
PubMed search
- Wikidata
View/Edit Human	View/Edit Mouse

K(lysine) acetyltransferase 8 (KAT8) is an enzyme that in humans is encoded by the KAT8 gene.

== Function ==
The MYST family of histone acetyltransferases, which includes KAT8, was named for the founding members MOZ (MYST3; MIM 601408), yeast YBF2 and SAS2, and TIP60 (HTATIP; MIM 601409). All members of this family contain a MYST region of about 240 amino acids with a canonical acetyl-CoA-binding site and a C2HC-type zinc finger motif. Most MYST proteins also have a chromodomain involved in protein-protein interactions and targeting transcriptional regulators to chromatin.

KAT8 is also known as MOF, and in humans hMOF. Given its fundamental role in modulating higher-order chromatin structure, hMOF is involved in many of the steps of the DNA damage response. The human hMOF gene encodes an enzyme that specifically acetylates histone H4 at lysine 16. The depletion of hMOF greatly decreases DNA double-strand break repair by both non-homologous end joining and homologous recombination. Thus MOF activity is critical for double-strand break repair.

== Interactions ==
KAT8 has been shown to interact with MORF4L1.
