= C10H17NO3 =

The molecular formula C_{10}H_{17}NO_{3} may refer to:

- Eprenetapopt
- Methylecgonine
