= Reprimo-like =

Human gene

Reprimo-like (RPRML) is a vertebrate gene located at human chromosome 17q21.32. It is a member of the Reprimo gene family which consists of two human-related protein-coding and intronless genes: Reprimo (RPRM) and RPRML. Although poorly characterized, this lineage has been implicated in important developmental and cancer processes.

== Function ==
RPRML is normally expressed during the embryonic development of zebrafish. Knocking down RPRML in this model, increases caspase-3 activity in the hemogenic endothelium, hindering the formation of hematopoietic precursor/stem cells and impairing definitive hematopoiesis.

In humans, RPRML protein expression has been reported in the cytoplasm of glandular and foveolar epithelial cells of the stomach. Analyses of multiple gastric tumors show its expression is significantly downregulated when compared to normal adjacent tissues. This loss of expression is associated with a reduction of the apoptotic marker cleaved caspase-3 and with a worse prognosis of patients with advanced stages of the disease. RPRML overexpression in gastric cancer cell lines inhibits cell cycle progression at the G2/M phase, reduces cell proliferation, clonogenic capacity, and anchorage-independent growth. Hence, it has been proposed as a novel tumor suppressor gene. In colorectal cancer cells, RPRML is a target of Wnt/β-catenin signaling pathway. Further research is warranted to fully elucidate its biological function.

Similar to its homolog RPRM, the silencing of RPRML in gastric cancer is mediated by DNA methylation. Circulating methylated RPRML DNA in plasma samples has been successfully explored as a non-invasive biomarker for gastric cancer diagnosis.
