= WRAP53 =

Protein-coding gene in the species Homo sapiens

Identifiers
- Aliases: WRAP53, DKCB3, TCAB1, WDR79, WD repeat containing antisense to TP53
- External IDs: OMIM: 612661; MGI: 2384933; GeneCards: WRAP53

Gene location (Human)
Chr.	Chromosome 17 (human)
Band	17p13.1	Start	7,686,071 bp
Band	17p13.1	End	7,703,502 bp

Gene location (Mouse)
Chr.	Chromosome 11 (mouse)
Band	11|11 B3	Start	69,452,584 bp
Band	11|11 B3	End	69,471,081 bp
RNA expression pattern
Bgee	Human / Mouse (ortholog); Top expressed in: right uterine tube; epithelium of bronchus; bronchial epithelial cell; testicle; pancreatic ductal cell; olfactory zone of nasal mucosa; ganglionic eminence; granulocyte; tibialis anterior muscle; mucosa of transverse colon / Top expressed in: blastocyst; spermatocyte; embryo; embryo; epiblast; granulocyte; morula; ventricular zone; right kidney; spermatid; More reference expression data
BioGPS	n/a
Gene ontology
Molecular function	chaperone binding; protein binding; telomerase RNA binding; RNA binding; identical protein binding; protein-containing complex binding
Cellular component	Cajal body; telomerase holoenzyme complex; nucleus; nucleoplasm; cytoplasm; cytosol; nuclear body
Biological process	telomerase RNA localization to Cajal body; positive regulation of establishment of protein localization to telomere; scaRNA localization to Cajal body; protein localization to Cajal body; positive regulation of telomerase activity; establishment of protein localization to telomere; telomere formation via telomerase; telomere maintenance via telomerase
Sources:Amigo / QuickGO
Orthologs
Databases	NCBI: entry; OMA: entry
Species	Human	Mouse
Entrez	55135	216853
Ensembl	ENSG00000141499	ENSMUSG00000041346
UniProt	Q9BUR4	Q8VC51
RefSeq (mRNA)	NM_001143990; NM_001143991; NM_001143992; NM_018081	NM_144824; NM_001364769
RefSeq (protein)	NP_001137462; NP_001137463; NP_001137464; NP_060551	NP_659073; NP_001351698
Location (UCSC)	Chr 17: 7.69 – 7.7 Mb	Chr 11: 69.45 – 69.47 Mb
PubMed search
- Wikidata
View/Edit Human	View/Edit Mouse

WRAP53 (also known as WD40-encoding RNA antisense to p53) is a gene implicated in cancer development. The name was coined in 2009 to describe the dual role of this gene, encoding both an antisense RNA that regulates the p53 tumor suppressor and a protein involved in DNA repair, telomere elongation and maintenance of nuclear organelles Cajal bodies (Figure 1).

== Gene ==
The WRAP53 gene is localized on chromosome 17p13.1 and contains 13 exons, including three alternative starting exons (1α, 1β and 1γ) generating at least three gene products. The WRAP53 gene partially overlaps the p53 tumor suppressor gene in a head-to-head orientation.

== Function ==
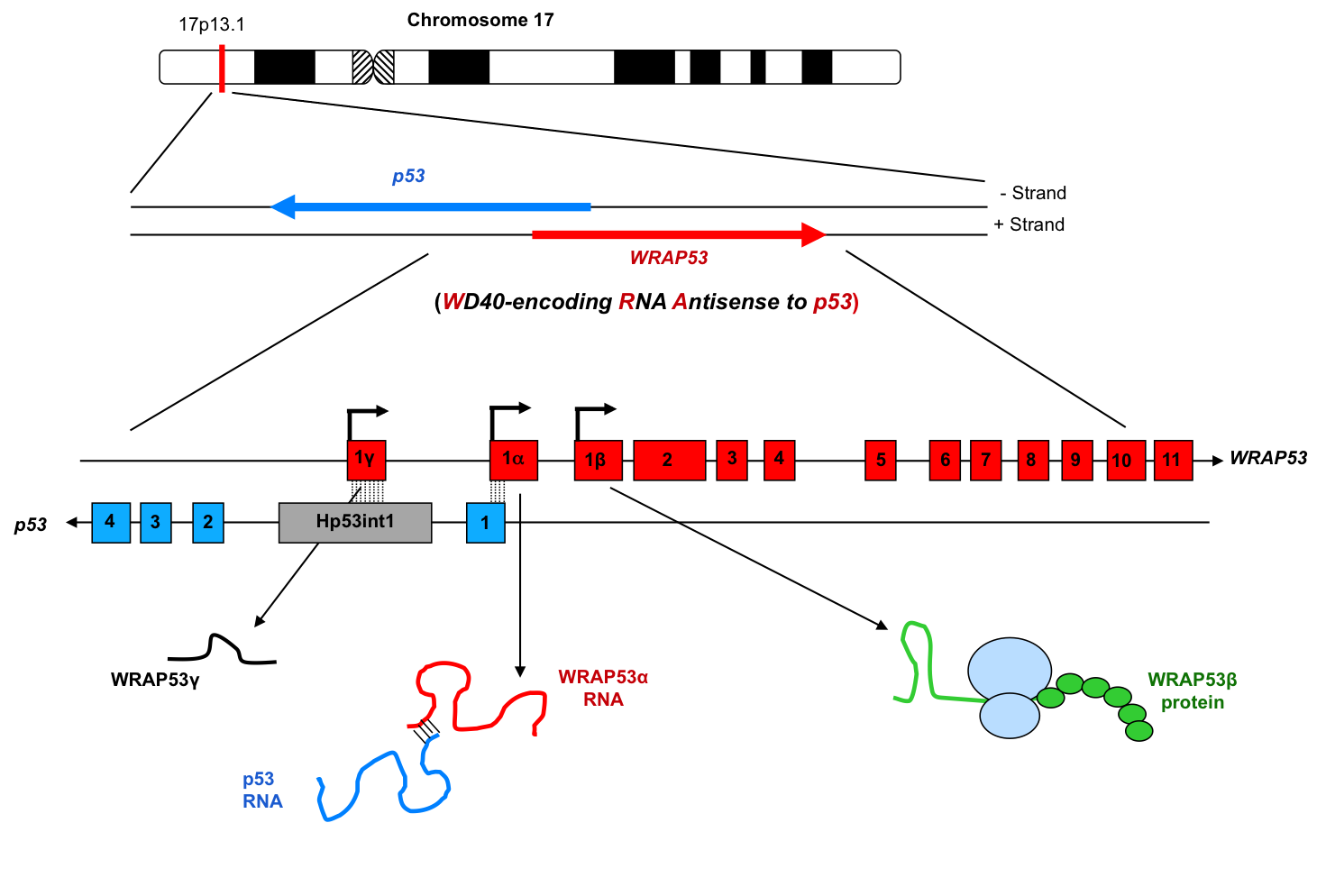
Figure1.The WRAP53 and p53 genes and their gene products. The arrows indicate the direction of transcription and the dotted lines the exon overlap between these genes.

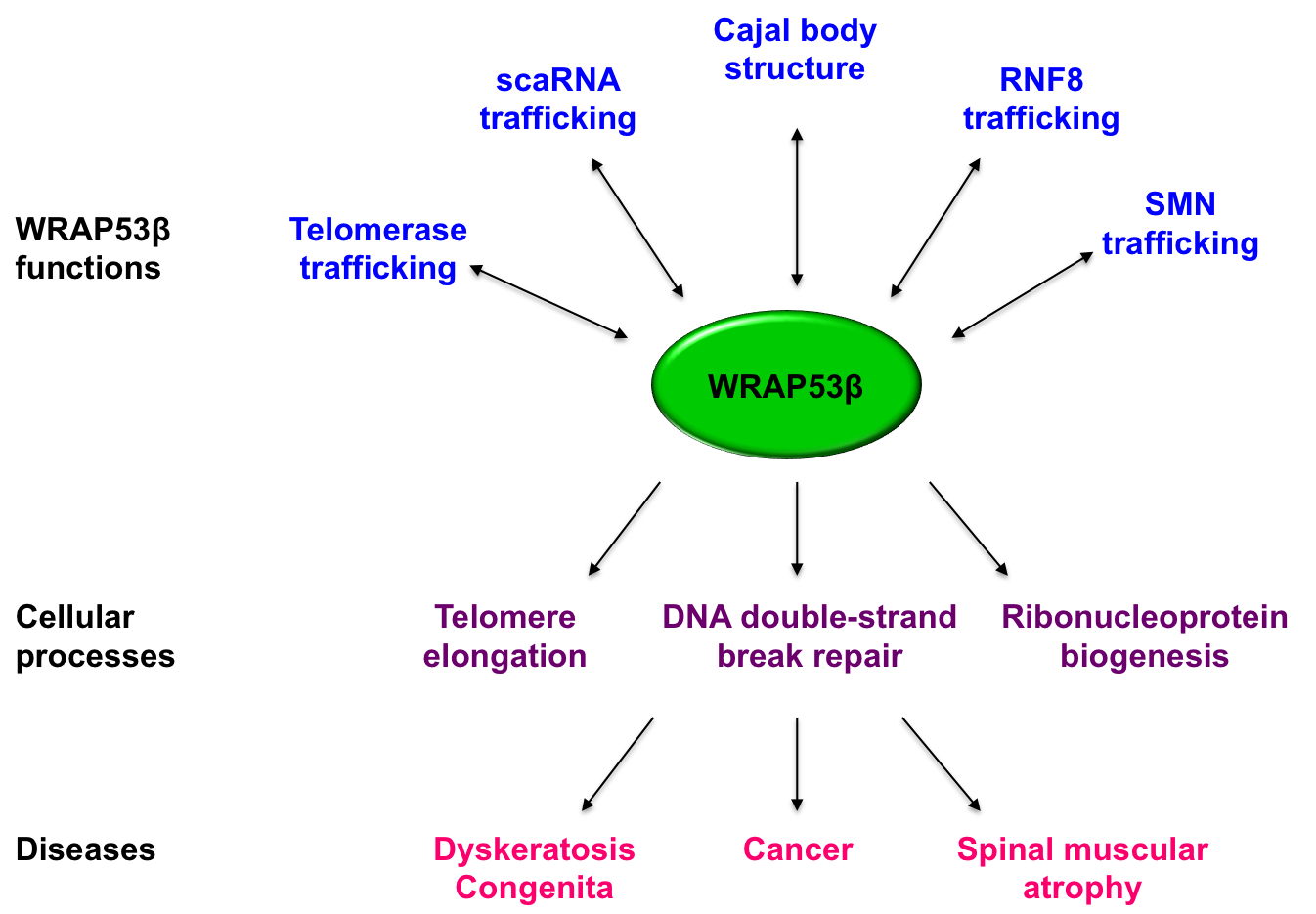
Figure 2. Functions of WRAP53β

Transcripts of WRAP53 that overlap the first exon of p53 (referred to as WRAP53α transcripts) regulate the levels of p53 mRNA and protein (Figure 1). WRAP53γ transcripts overlap the first intron of p53 and are antisense to the previously identified transcript Hp53int1 localized within this intron. However, the function of WRAP53γ remains elusive.

The WRAP53 gene also encodes a protein termed WRAP53β (alias WRAP53 or WDR79 or TCAB1), which belongs to the WD40 protein family (Figure 1). WRAP53β facilitates protein-protein and protein-RNA interactions and directs factors to nuclear organelles Cajal bodies, to telomeres and to DNA double-strand breaks. Factors localized to Cajal bodies with the help of WRAP53β includes the SMN protein, small Cajal body-specific scaRNAs and the enzyme telomerase. WRAP53β also targets the ubiquitin ligase RNF8 to DNA double-strand breaks(Figure 2).

In addition to localizing factors to correct cellular sites, WRAP53β maintain structural integrity of Cajal bodies and without WRAP53β these organelles collapse and cannot re-form (Figure 2).

== Domains ==
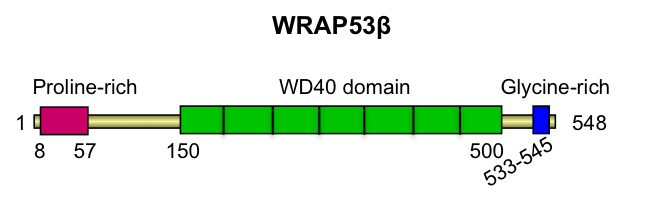
Figure 3. The structure of WRAP53β. The numbers indicate amino acid residues.

The WRAP53β protein is highly evolutionary conserved, with homologs (confined to its WD40 repeats) in vertebrates, invertebrates, plants and yeast. WRAP53β consists of a proline-rich N-terminus, a central WD40 domain and a glycine-rich C-terminus (Figure 3). The WD40 domain of WRAP53β serves as a scaffold for multiple interactions between a wide variety of molecules.

== Clinical significance ==
=== Dyskeratosis congenita ===
Germline mutations in WRAP53β result in disorder known as dyskeratosis congenita, characterized by bone marrow failure, premature ageing, predisposition for cancer and a triad of mucocutaneous features including oral leukoplakia, abnormal skin pigmentation and nail dystrophy. Mutations in WRAP53β are inherited in an autosomal recessive fashion, reside in highly conserved regions of its WD40 domain and result in a more severe form of this disease.

These mutations reduce the nuclear level of WRAP53β, impair its trafficking of telomerase to telomeres, and subsequently lead to progressive shortening of telomeres in these patients The chaperonin CCT/TRiC is crucial for proper folding of WRAP53β and this folding is impaired in dyskeratosis congenita

=== Spinal muscular atrophy ===
Defective WRAP53β-mediated trafficking of SMN is observed in patients afflicted by the most severe form of spinal muscular atrophy (type I or Werdnig-Hoffmann disease), a neurodegenerative disorder characterized by progressive degeneration of spinal cord anterior horn α-motor neurons and the leading genetic cause of infant mortality with an incidence of approximately 1:6000 live births. Mutations in the SMN1 gene are the underlying cause to spinal muscular atrophy (SMA).

=== Cancer ===
WRAP53β is overexpressed in a variety of cancer cell lines of different origins and such overexpression promotes carcinogenic transformation indicating that this protein possesses oncogenic properties. WRAP53β is overexpressed in primary nasopharyngeal carcinoma, esophageal squamous cell carcinoma and rectal cancer. Moreover, knockdown of WRAP53β in cancer cells reduced the size of the tumors formed when these are grafted into mice and triggers mitochondrial-dependent apoptosis in cancer cells.

In contrary, inactivating mutations in both alleles of WRAP53β causes dyskeratosis congenita, indicating that this protein acts as tumor suppressor, rather than an oncogene. Loss of nuclear WRAP53β is also correlated with shortened survival and resistance to radiotherapy in patients with head and neck cancer. With its complex roles in a number of cellular processes, WRAP53β may act as a tumor suppressor under certain conditions and as an oncogene in under others.

Single nucleotide polymorphisms (SNPs) in the WRAP53 gene have been linked to an increased risk for breast and ovarian cancer. One of these SNPs also associate with defective DNA repair and hematotoxicity in workers exposed to benzene.

== Discovery ==
The WRAP53 gene was first identified by Marianne Farnebo (maiden name Hammarsund) at Karolinska Institutet in 2006. In 2009 the WRAP53β (alias TCAB1, WDR79 and WRAP53) protein was described by Steven Artandi (Stanford University), Joan Steitz (Yale University) and Marianne Farnebo (Karolinska Institutet) independently.
