= LMO3 =

Protein-coding gene in humans

Identifiers
- Aliases: LMO3, RBTN3, RBTNL2, RHOM3, Rhom-3, LIM domain only 3
- External IDs: OMIM: 180386; MGI: 102810; GeneCards: LMO3

Gene location (Human)
Chr.	Chromosome 12 (human)
Band	12p12.3	Start	16,548,372 bp
Band	12p12.3	End	16,610,594 bp

Gene location (Mouse)
Chr.	Chromosome 6 (mouse)
Band	6 G1|6 69.02 cM	Start	138,339,916 bp
Band	6 G1|6 69.02 cM	End	138,558,966 bp
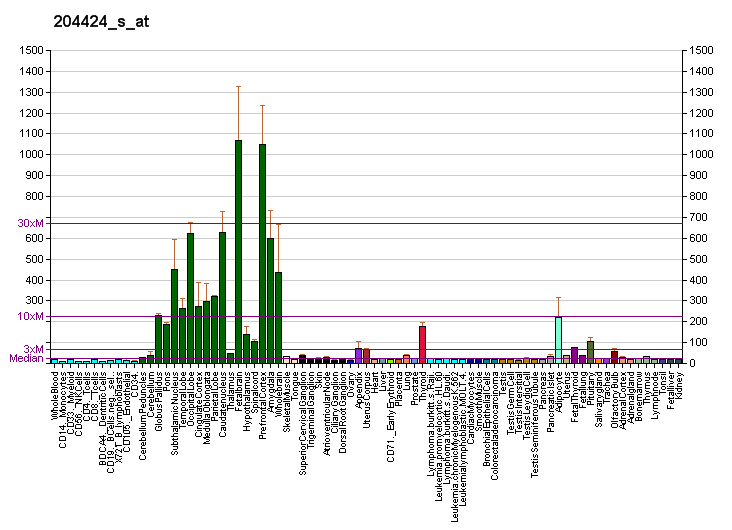
RNA expression pattern
Bgee	Human / Mouse (ortholog); Top expressed in: middle temporal gyrus; Brodmann area 46; Brodmann area 23; orbitofrontal cortex; superior frontal gyrus; entorhinal cortex; endothelial cell; postcentral gyrus; optic nerve; nucleus accumbens / Top expressed in: piriform cortex; Region I of hippocampus proper; dentate gyrus of hippocampal formation granule cell; superior frontal gyrus; amygdala; hippocampus proper; lumbar subsegment of spinal cord; dorsal striatum; primary visual cortex; anterior amygdaloid area; More reference expression data
BioGPS	More reference expression data
Gene ontology
Molecular function	protein binding; metal ion binding
Cellular component	cytoplasm
Biological process	negative regulation of ERK1 and ERK2 cascade; regulation of transcription, DNA-templated; positive regulation of fat cell differentiation; positive regulation of glucocorticoid receptor signaling pathway; transcription, DNA-templated; positive regulation of peroxisome proliferator activated receptor signaling pathway
Sources:Amigo / QuickGO
Orthologs
Databases	NCBI: entry; OMA: entry
Species	Human	Mouse
Entrez	55885	109593
Ensembl	ENSG00000048540	ENSMUSG00000030226
UniProt	Q8TAP4	Q8BZL8
RefSeq (mRNA)	NM_001001395; NM_001243609; NM_001243610; NM_001243611; NM_001243612 NM_001243613; NM_018640	NM_207222; NM_001356305; NM_001356306; NM_001356307
RefSeq (protein)	NP_001001395; NP_001230538; NP_001230539; NP_001230540; NP_001230541 NP_001230542; NP_061110	NP_997105; NP_001343234; NP_001343235; NP_001343236
Location (UCSC)	Chr 12: 16.55 – 16.61 Mb	Chr 6: 138.34 – 138.56 Mb
PubMed search
- Wikidata
View/Edit Human	View/Edit Mouse

LIM domain only protein 3 is a transcription co-factor, which in humans is encoded by the LMO3 gene. LMO3 interacts with the tumor suppressor p53 and regulates its function. LMO3 is considered to be an oncogene in Neuroblastoma.
