= Pifithrin =

Pifithrin-α
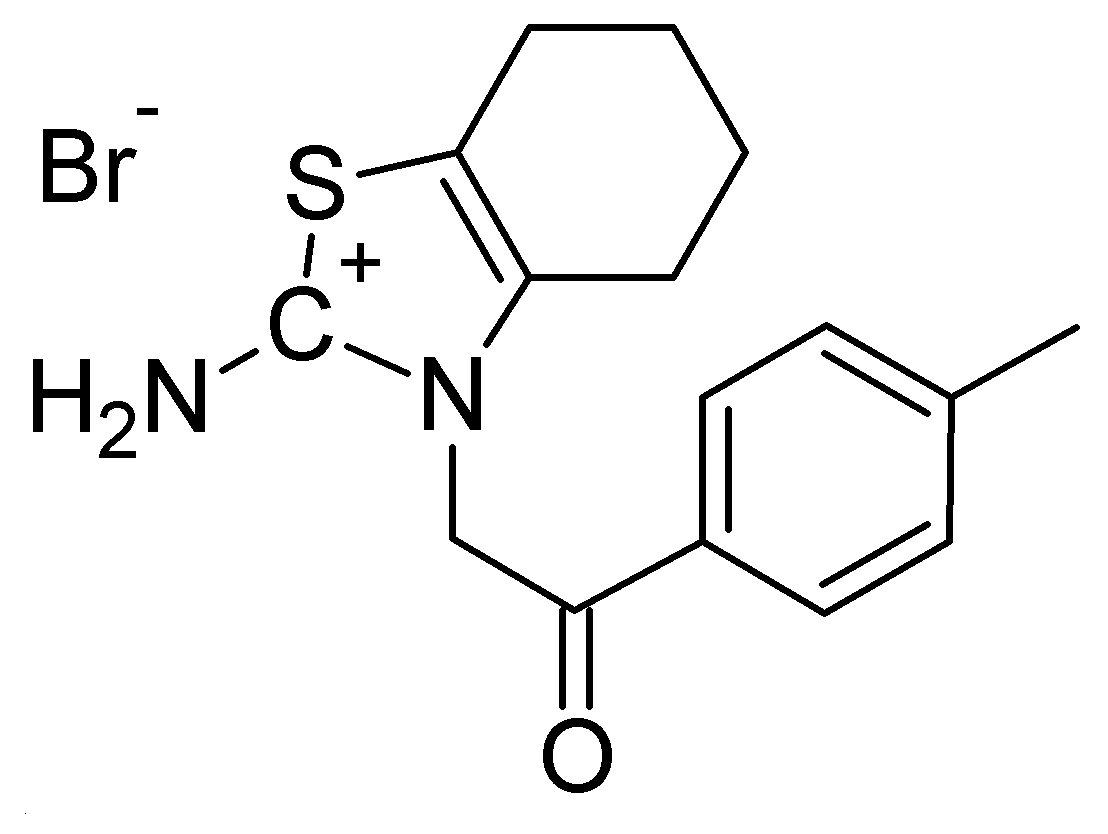

Names
- IUPAC name 2-amino-3-[2-(4-methylphenyl)-2-oxoethyl]-2,3,4,5,6,7-hexahydro-1,3-benzothiazol-2-ylium bromide

Identifiers
CAS Number	α: 63208-82-2; β: 60477-34-1
3D model (JSmol)	α: Interactive image; β: Interactive image; Interactive image
ChEBI	α: CHEBI:93168; β: CHEBI:92551
ChEMBL	α: ChEMBL556353; β: ChEMBL193504
ChemSpider	α: 21106463
KEGG	β: C11571
PubChem CID	α: 4817; β: 443278
UNII	α: D213B92S1Y; β: 45I8QO7K37
CompTox Dashboard (EPA)	α: DTXSID10432994
- InChI: InChI=1S/C16H18N2OS.BrH/c1-11-6-8-12(9-7-11)14(19)10-18-13-4-2-3-5-15(13)20-16(18)17;/h6-9,17H,2-5,10H2,1H3;1H Key: HAGVCKULCLQGRF-UHFFFAOYSA-N; α: InChI=1/C16H19N2OS.BrH/c1-11-6-8-12(9-7-11)14(19)10-18-13-4-2-3-5-15(13)20-16(18)17;/h6-9H,2-5,10,17H2,1H3;1H/q+1;/p-1 Key: KXMMOFYVZLFBEG-REWHXWOFAW; β: InChI=1S/C16H16N2S/c1-11-6-8-12(9-7-11)13-10-18-14-4-2-3-5-15(14)19-16(18)17-13/h6-10H,2-5H2,1H3
- SMILES: α: CC1=CC=C(C=C1)C(=O)CN2C3=C(CCCC3)SC2=N; β: CC1=CC=C(C=C1)C2=CN3C4=C(CCCC4)SC3=N2; [Br-].Cc1ccc(cc1)C(=O)Cn2[c+](N)sc3CCCCc23

Properties
Chemical formula	C_{16}H_{19}BrN_{2}OS
Molar mass	367.30 g/mol
Melting point	192.1 °C (377.8 °F; 465.2 K)
- Except where otherwise noted, data are given for materials in their standard state (at 25 °C [77 °F], 100 kPa). verify (what is ?) Infobox references

Pifithrin-α (chemical name 2-(2-Imino-4,5,6,7-tetrahydrobenzothiazol-3-yl)-1-p-tolylethanone hydrobromide) is a chemical compound which acts as an inhibitor of the tumour-suppressing and epileptogenic protein p53. It has a molecular weight of 367.30 and is soluble in DMSO up to 20 mg/mL. Its melting point is 192.1-192.5 °C.
