= Rezatapopt =

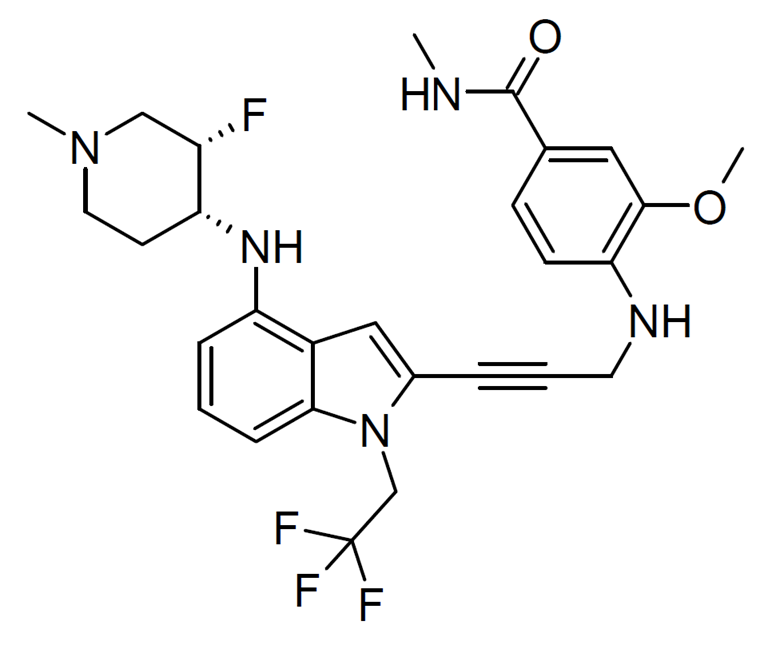

Identifiers
- IUPAC name: 4-[3-[4-[[(3S,4R)-3-fluoro-1-methylpiperidin-4-yl]amino]-1-(2,2,2-trifluoroethyl)indol-2-yl]prop-2-ynylamino]-3-methoxy-N-methylbenzamide
- CAS Number: 2636846-41-6
- PubChem CID: 156195543
- UNII: 5W59S33KC9

Chemical and physical data
- Formula: C_{28}H_{31}F_{4}N_{5}O_{2}
- Molar mass: 545.583 g·mol^{−1}
- 3D model (JSmol): Interactive image
- SMILES: CNC(=O)C1=CC(=C(C=C1)NCC#CC2=CC3=C(C=CC=C3N2CC(F)(F)F)N[C@@H]4CCN(C[C@@H]4F)C)OC
- InChI: InChI=1S/C28H31F4N5O2/c1-33-27(38)18-9-10-24(26(14-18)39-3)34-12-5-6-19-15-20-22(35-23-11-13-36(2)16-21(23)29)7-4-8-25(20)37(19)17-28(30,31)32/h4,7-10,14-15,21,23,34-35H,11-13,16-17H2,1-3H3,(H,33,38)/t21-,23+/m0/s1; Key:NKRKBSQLUPEVCZ-JTHBVZDNSA-N

Rezatapopt (PC14586) is a drug which acts as a p53 reactivator and has potential applications in cancer treatment. The p53 family of proteins are regulatory molecules which usually have an important role in preventing tissues from becoming cancerous. Mutations in p53 are one of the most common steps involved in the progression of tissues toward a cancerous state, and around 50% of human tumours show mutations in p53 which reduce or abolish its activity. One of the more common mutations is Y220C, which leads to an inactive form of p53. Rezatapopt binds to the Y220C mutant form of p53 and causes a conformational change which restores its anti-cancer activity, even though the protein is still mutated. It also shows some restoration of activity of other p53 mutants such as Y220N and Y220S. Rezatapopt has shown promising results in Phase I/II human clinical trials, but with some indications that reactivation of p53 can stimulate further mutation into forms which are no longer activated by rezatapopt. This means that if rezatapopt or drugs like it end up being approved for medical use, it will most likely be as part of a cocktail approach alongside other anti-cancer drugs, rather than as a single agent.
