= CDC14B =

Protein-coding gene in humans

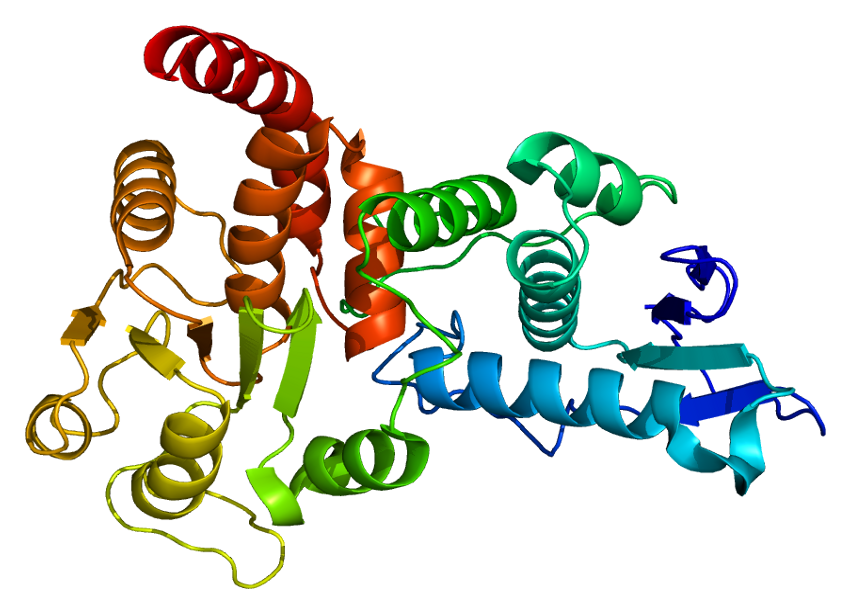

Identifiers
- Aliases: CDC14B, CDC14B3, Cdc14B1, Cdc14B2, hcell division cycle 14B
- External IDs: OMIM: 603505; MGI: 2441808; GeneCards: CDC14B
Available structures
PDB	Ortholog search: PDBe RCSB
PDB	List of PDB id codes 1OHC, 1OHD, 1OHE
Enzyme activity
EC #	BRENDA	ExPASy	KEGG	MetaCyc
3.1.3.16	↗	↗	↗	↗
3.1.3.48	↗	↗	↗	↗

Gene location (Human)
Chr.	Chromosome 9 (human)
Band	9q22.32-q22.33	Start	96,490,241 bp
Band	9q22.32-q22.33	End	96,619,843 bp

Gene location (Mouse)
Chr.	Chromosome 13 (mouse)
Band	13|13 B3	Start	64,189,268 bp
Band	13|13 B3	End	64,275,290 bp
RNA expression pattern
Bgee	Human / Mouse (ortholog); Top expressed in: corpus callosum; tendon of biceps brachii; internal globus pallidus; optic nerve; retinal pigment epithelium; C1 segment; gonad; inferior ganglion of vagus nerve; bronchial epithelial cell; seminal vesicula / Top expressed in: hand; Epithelium of choroid plexus; spermatid; primitive streak; gastrula; maxillary prominence; left lobe of liver; mandibular prominence; tail of embryo; atrium; More reference expression data
BioGPS	n/a
Gene ontology
Molecular function	protein tyrosine phosphatase activity; phosphoprotein phosphatase activity; hydrolase activity; protein tyrosine/serine/threonine phosphatase activity; phosphatase activity; protein binding; protein serine/threonine phosphatase activity
Cellular component	nucleus; nucleolus; cytoplasm; nucleoplasm; spindle pole; centrosome; mitotic spindle
Biological process	DNA repair; cellular response to DNA damage stimulus; dephosphorylation; protein dephosphorylation; peptidyl-tyrosine dephosphorylation; positive regulation of ubiquitin protein ligase activity; regulation of exit from mitosis; mitotic spindle midzone assembly; cilium assembly; mitotic G2 DNA damage checkpoint signaling; microtubule cytoskeleton organization; mitotic cell cycle; positive regulation of cytokinesis
Sources:Amigo / QuickGO
Orthologs
Databases	NCBI: entry; OMA: entry
Species	Human	Mouse
Entrez	8555	218294
Ensembl	ENSG00000081377	ENSMUSG00000033102
UniProt	O60729	Q6PFY9
RefSeq (mRNA)	NM_001077181; NM_003671; NM_033331; NM_033332; NM_001351567 NM_001351568; NM_001351569; NM_001351570	NM_001122989; NM_172587
RefSeq (protein)	NP_001070649; NP_003662; NP_201588; NP_001338496; NP_001338497 NP_001338498; NP_001338499	NP_001116461; NP_766175
Location (UCSC)	Chr 9: 96.49 – 96.62 Mb	Chr 13: 64.19 – 64.28 Mb
PubMed search
- Wikidata
View/Edit Human	View/Edit Mouse

Dual specificity protein phosphatase CDC14B is an enzyme that in humans is encoded by the CDC14B gene.

The protein encoded by this gene is a member of the dual specificity protein tyrosine phosphatase family. This protein is highly similar to Saccharomyces cerevisiae Cdc14, a protein tyrosine phosphatase involved in the exit of cell mitosis and initiation of DNA replication, which suggests the role in cell cycle control. Specifically, it is thought to fulfil this role by bundling and stabilising microtubules. This protein has been shown to interact with and dephosphorylates tumor suppressor protein p53, and is thought to regulate the function of p53. Alternative splicing of this gene results in 3 transcript variants encoding distinct isoforms.

== Interactions and Functions ==
CDC14B has been shown to interact with p53, de-phosphorylate p53 at Serine 315 and potentially modulate p53 stability. At the patho-physiological level, mice with CDC14B deletion were shown to exhibit early-onset ageing phenotypes.
