= Reprimo =

Reprimo (RPRM), is a gene located at human chromosome 2q23 whose expression in conjunction with p53, along with other genes which are p53-induced, is associated with the arrest of the cell cycle at the G2 phase. Reprimo's protein product is a highly glycosylated polypeptide which, upon its expression, is localized to the cytoplasm where it is primarily active. As the expression of reprimo is controlled by p53, which is in turn controlled by a wide array of convergent signal pathways pertaining to DNA damage or nutrient depravity, its presence is expected within cells which would cause damage should they be freely allowed to replicate. Pursuant to this, reprimo's expression during the G2 phase of the cell cycle ultimately results in the reduction of Cdc2 expression, and in the inhibition of the nuclear translocation of cyclin B1 which is necessary to its function. Reprimo is known to collaborate with p21 to achieve these specific effects, and in a more general sense collaborates with the other p53-induced proteins and effectors to produce the overall cellular response. These regulatory actions help to render the afflicted cell into an arrested state which is less immediately threatening to the whole organism due to the inability of afflicted cells to replicate with damaged DNA, among other potential circumstances, giving the cell an opportunity to undergo DNA repair or apoptosis as the level of damage will dictate. Indefinite cell cycle arrest is another potential outcome. For this reason, it is considered to be a tumor suppressor gene.

Identification of this gene's repression via methylation to its upstream promoter region within various types of cancerous tissue have been used to suggest a connection to the formation of said cancer. These methylation events commonly cause aberrant DNA splicing which may cause one of many potential errors within the resulting mutant reprimo that ultimately undermine its ability to be expressed, have its intended effects, or to accumulate in sufficient quantities to produce the expected arrest reaction. The variability of these outcomes is owed to the large probability space for these point mutations. There is also research to suggest that this gene's expression status within specific tissues may be useful information for the diagnosis or prognosis of certain types of cancer.

== Utility in cancer detection and prognosis ==
In those whom have already been diagnosed with primary pancreatic cancer, there is a correlative relationship to suggest there will be a much worse prognosis when said tissues were found to contain these methylations to reprimo's promoter.

In terms of early detection, the methylation status of reprimo in esophageal and gastric tissues have had some success in predicting the development of cancer. In the case of gastric cancer, detection methods include sampling of blood plasma.
