= Eprenetapopt =

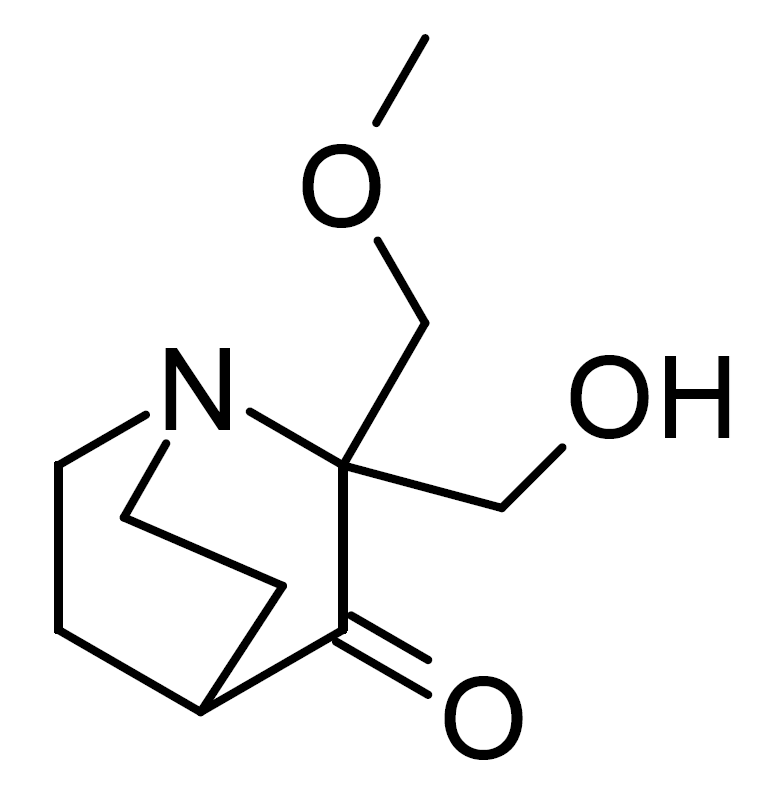

Identifiers
- IUPAC name: 2-(hydroxymethyl)-2-(methoxymethyl)-1-azabicyclo[2.2.2]octan-3-one
- CAS Number: 5291-32-7
- PubChem CID: 52918385
- DrugBank: DB11684
- ChemSpider: 24606048
- UNII: Z41TGB4080
- KEGG: D12192
- ChEMBL: ChEMBL3186011
- CompTox Dashboard (EPA): DTXSID401164013

Chemical and physical data
- Formula: C_{10}H_{17}NO_{3}
- Molar mass: 199.250 g·mol^{−1}
- 3D model (JSmol): Interactive image
- SMILES: COCC1(C(=O)C2CCN1CC2)CO
- InChI: InChI=1S/C10H17NO3/c1-14-7-10(6-12)9(13)8-2-4-11(10)5-3-8/h8,12H,2-7H2,1H3; Key:BGBNULCRKBVAKL-UHFFFAOYSA-N

Eprenetapopt (APR-246) is an experimental anti-cancer drug which acts by reactivating certain mutant forms of p53, a tumour-suppressing gene which is commonly mutated into inactive forms as an early step in the development of malignant cancers. It has been researched over many years for treatment of numerous forms of cancer and reached late-stage clinical trials, but has never yet been approved for medical use due to inconsistent results. Nevertheless, it continues to be studied especially as a combination treatment alongside other anti-cancer medications, or in patients whose cancers have particular mutant forms of p53 thought to be susceptible to treatment with eprenetapopt.
