= Hp53int1 =

Human Protein 53 intron 1

Identifiers
- Aliases
- External IDs: GeneCards: ; OMA:- orthologs
Orthologs
Species	Human	Mouse
Entrez	n/a	n/a
Ensembl	n/a	n/a
UniProt	n a	n/a
RefSeq (mRNA)	n/a	n/a
RefSeq (protein)	n/a	n/a
Location (UCSC)	n/a	n/a
PubMed search	n/a	n/a
- Wikidata
View/Edit Human

Human protein 53 intron 1 (Hp53int1) is a protein encoded by the Hp53int1 gene in humans.

== Gene ==
Figure 1: The location of Hp53int1 protein on chromosome 17p.13, region 7,685,260 bp-7,686,371 bp

The Hp53int1 gene is located on chromosome 17p.13, encoded by a DNA sequence 1125 base pairs in length, covering region 7,685,260 bp-7,686,371 bp. The Hp53int1 gene has two aliases, WRAP53int1 and TP53int1, in accordance to its overlap with the WRAP53 and TP53int1 genes on chromosome 17. Hp53int1 is located downstream of the p53p2 start site.

Hp53int1 does not have multiple exons, and therefore has no isoforms.

=== Important relationship to TP53 ===
The Hp53int1 gene is transcribed in the same direction as TP53 and is present in TP53 protein-rich myeloid leukemia cells HL-60 and U937. This suggests a strong relationship to the TP53 gene and subsequent protein, including a share of transcription factors, promoter signals, tissue expression, and subcellular localization. While these genes are not identical, this relationship may give clues to function, structure, and expression.

== mRNA transcript ==
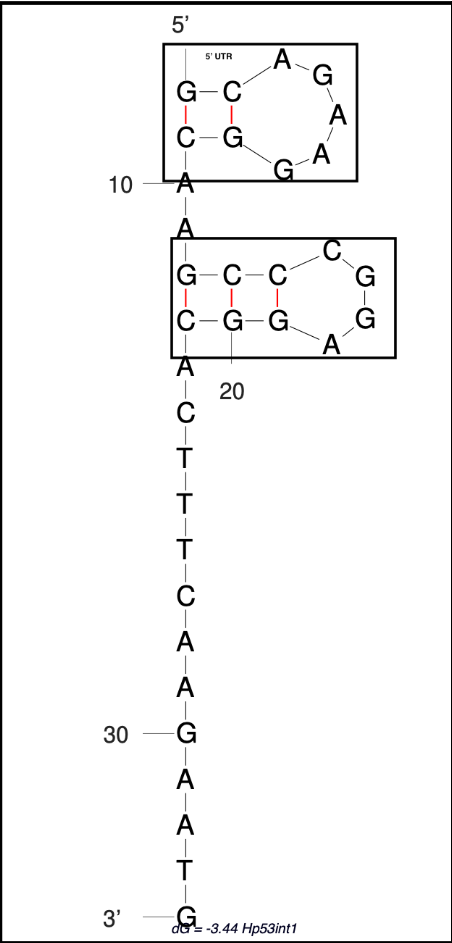
5' UTR Analysis:The consensus folding of the 5' UTR of Hp53int1. Two loops are formed from amino acids 1-9 and 12-21 respectively. The connecting amino acids of both loops are rich in G's and C's.

Hp53int1 is encoded by a polyadenylated transcript 1125 base pairs in length. There is a repeat sequence between base pairs 633...926 and a regulatory Poly A tail sequence between base pairs 496...1000. The repeat sequence between base pairs 633 and 926 is noted to be similar to the Alu SC subfamily repeat, a sequence that characterizes the most abundant repeat sequences in humans and primates, and which likely diverged from other Alu subfamily complexes around 32 million years ago.

=== Promoter sequence ===
The promoter sequence of the Hp53int1 gene was shown to be 540 base pairs in length. Transcription factors SMAD2, SRY, and ETV7 had Basewise Conservation Scores of 2.99, 2.73, and 3.03 respectively, with value of 4 indicating the highest conservation and -0.5 the lowest. KLF2 and KLF5 had scores of 3.73 each. The species being compared were elephant, dog, rhesus macaque, and chicken.

== Protein ==
The Hp53int1 protein has a molecular weight of 13.3 kdal and is 118 amino acids in length. It is a basic protein. There is one highly conserved amino acid sequence between 102 and 110. Serine site distribution is significantly higher than Arginine and Tyrosine sites. There is a possible Casein Kinase II phosphorylation site between amino acids 22–25. Casein Kinase II phosphorylation is involved in cell proliferation. Three regions of disorder are predicted for the Hp53int1 protein.

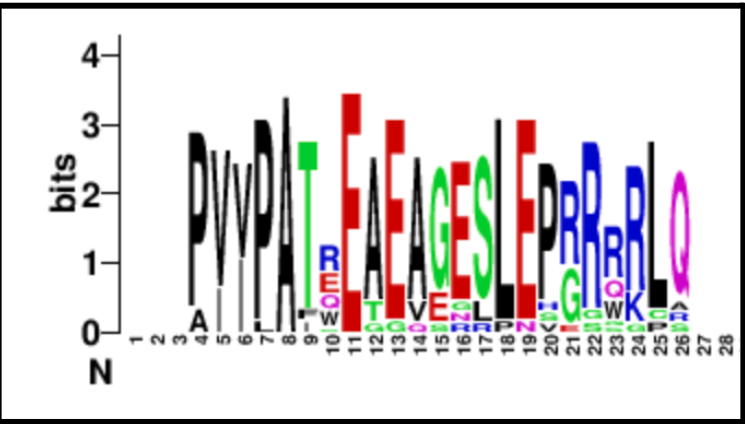
Web Logo results using a multiple sequence alignment between Hp53int1 and its orthologs.

=== Post translational modifications ===
There is a possible O-ß-GlcNAc site between amino acids 14–20. There are no transmembrane domains nor signal peptides.

There is a conserved phosphorylation site at S5, S15, and S20.

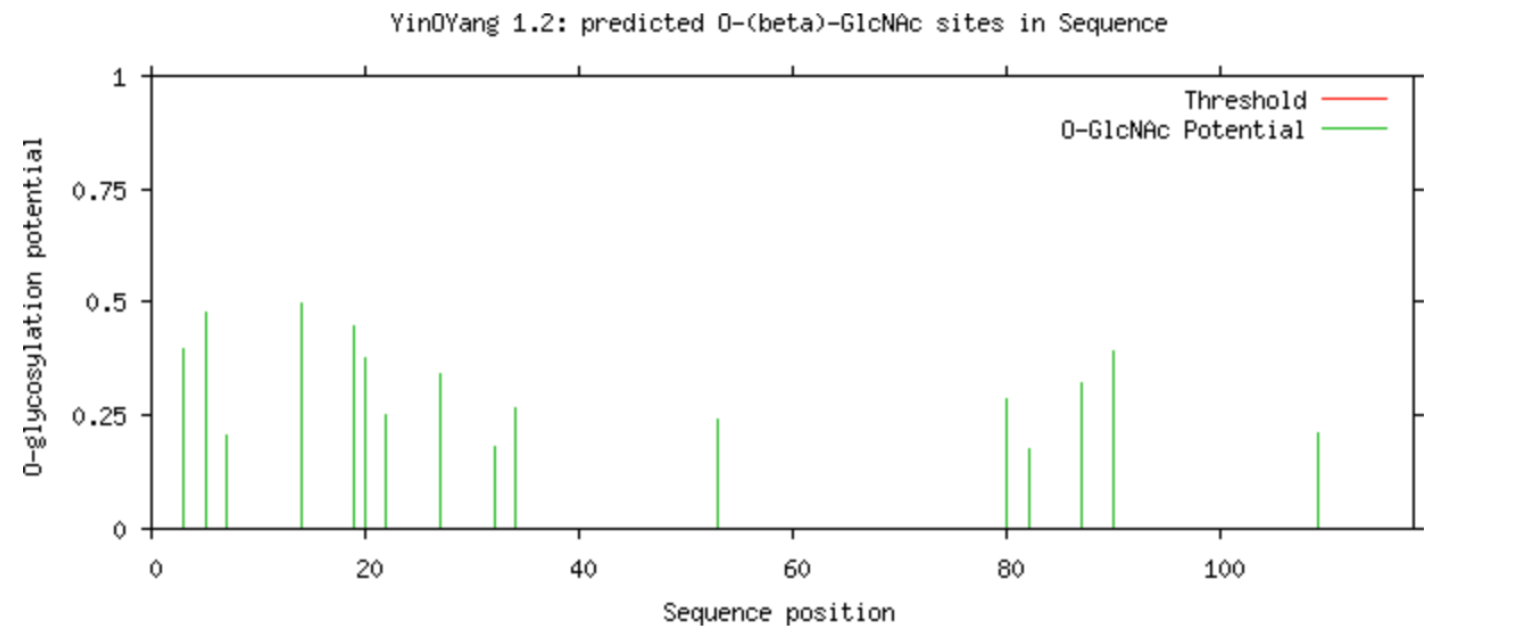
Predictions for O-ß-GlcNAc in the Hp53int1 protein given by Yin O Yang. The green bars represent the potential for O-ß-GlcNAc attachment sites in Hp53int1, and must reach a value > 0.50 to be considered a likely site. There is one predicted attachment site for Hp53int1.

== Structure ==
=== Secondary ===
Hp53int1 protein is predicted to contain one alpha helix and five beta sheets. There are eight possible protein binding sites.

=== Tertiary ===
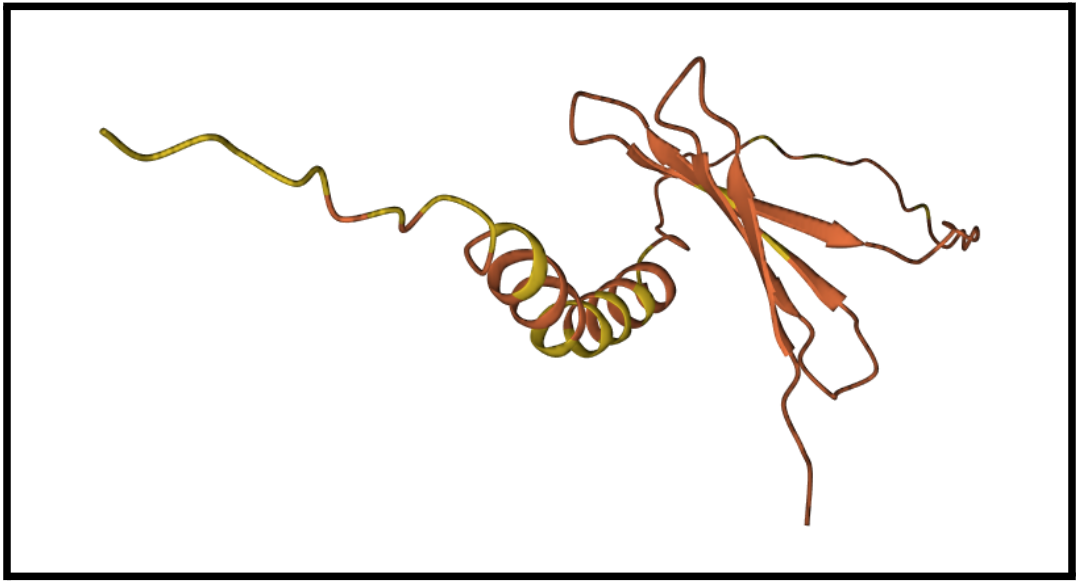
The predicted tertiary structure of the Hp53int1 protein as constructed by UnitProt Alpha Fold.

=== Subcellular localization ===
There is a 56.5% likelihood that the Hp53int1 protein is localized within the cytoplasm.

== Tissue expression ==
There is low tissue specificity for the Hp53int1 gene. When comparing various samples of adult human tissues there is high expression in the thymus, ovaries, lymph nodes, and white blood cells. There was a high expression score for both RNA expression and protein expression in proximal digestive tract, gastrointestinal tract, and male/female tissues. During fetal development between weeks 10 and 16, there is elevated expression in the lung and heart tissues.

Hp53int1 is differentially expressed under conditions that require cell proliferation or apoptosis, in accordance to its congruence with the TP53 tumor suppressor gene

== Homology and evolution ==
=== Paralogs ===
The Hp53int1 gene was found to have no paralogs.

=== Orthologs ===
Using NCBI BLAST sequence analysis and Clustal W a multiple sequence alignment was formulated for Hp53int1 and twenty top BLAST hits.

While the objective of this research was to find several orthologs across a variety of mammals, vertebrates, and invertebrates, there were only results in two classes: primates and bacteria. Furthermore, there was only one amino acid sequence within Hp53int1 and its orthologs of a general 20 amino acids in length that directly aligned). The primate genes are located on chromosome 13 while Hp53int1 is located on chromosome 17. There is also evidence for subcellular localization of the primate proteins within the nuclear envelope, while evidence for Hp53int1 suggests it is in the cytoplasm. Thus, it is reasonable to assume that the primates are not strict orthologs. A possible explanation for why strict Hp53int1 alignments are only found in bacteria is a possible crossing over event shared between bacteria and a common ancestor of primates.

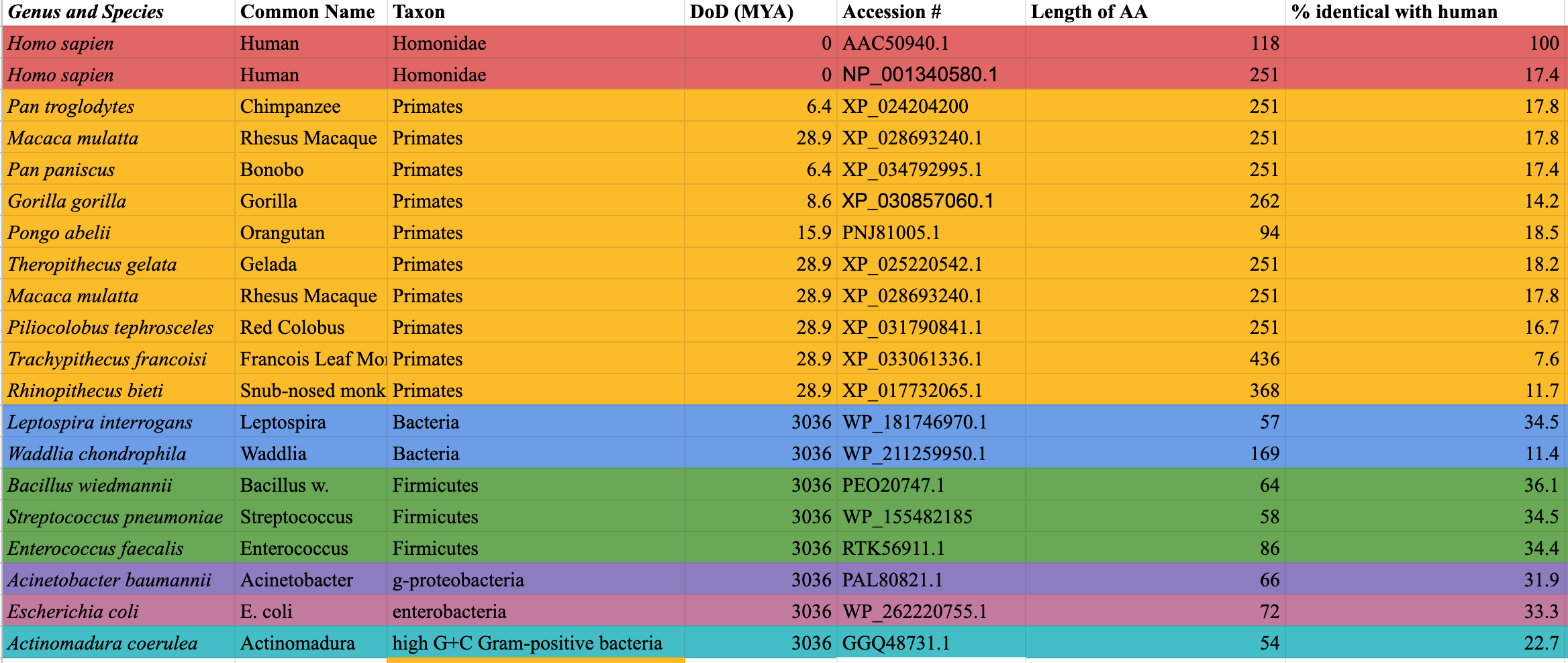

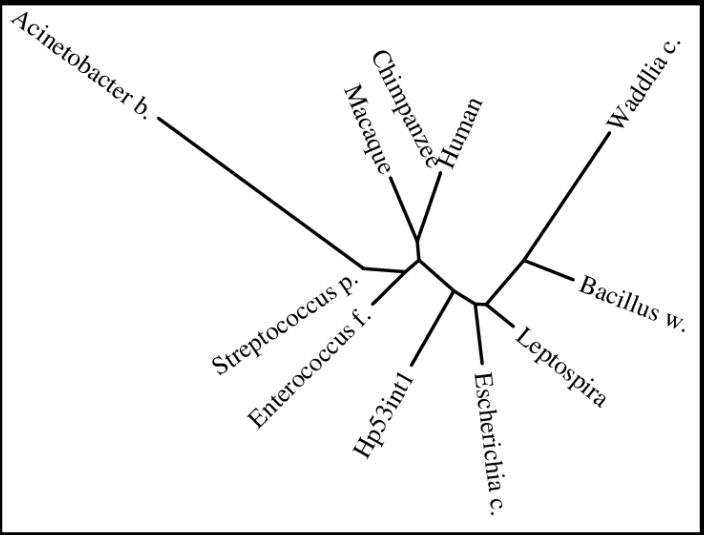
The phylogenetic tree of the Hp53int1 distant orthologs in the radial format.

== Function ==
The Hp53int1 protein is likely involved in the regulation of cellular proliferation and apoptosis. This is indicated by the use of apoptosis-regulator and ubiquitination regulator interacting proteins, its share of transcription factors with TP53 (especially the SMAD2, SRY, and ETV7 transcription factors), its location downstream of the p53p2 start site, its casein kinase II phosphorylation site, and its ubiquitous expression across tissues. The Hp53int1 gene expression is increased in environments where proteins that reduce cell proliferation are overexpressed, suggesting its requirement in cellular environments that need to arrest cell growth. Also, quantitative analysis shows that the general hp53 protein is absolutely required for the activation of cellular response to DNA damage.

=== Interacting Proteins ===
The following interacting proteins were found for TP53, but can be applied to Hp53int1 due to their chromosomal relationship. Important to note: the functions of these interacting proteins are directly involved in cell regulation (ubiquitination, transcriptional regulator, apoptosis, and protein-tyrosine kinase).

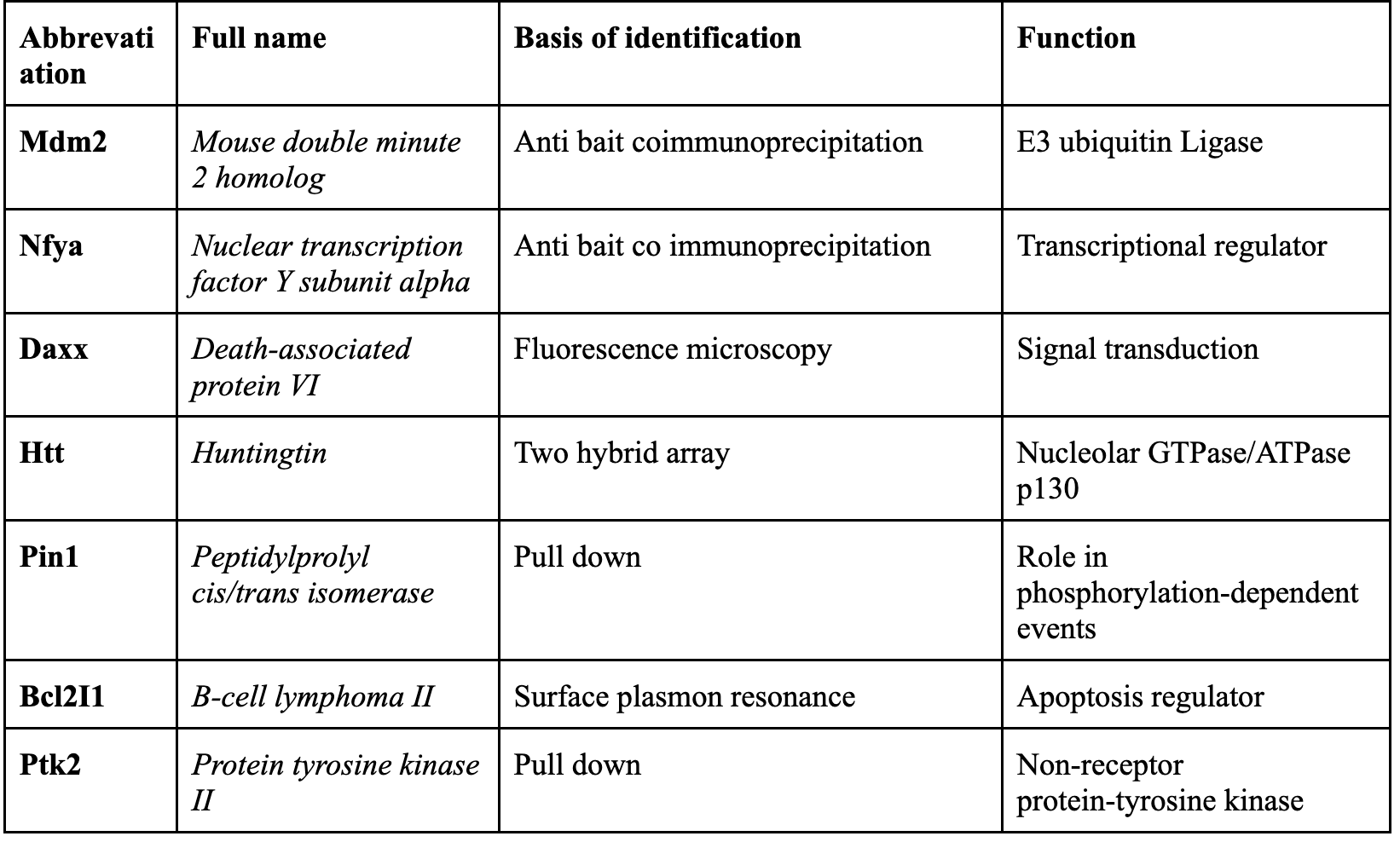

=== SNPs ===
There are two identified SNPS for Hp53int1. SNP 15 falls at position 32 in a sequence of 43 residues located upstream of the largest ORF of the TP53 promoter. SNP 20 is then located 45 bp downstream of the 3' end of the 1125 bp cDNA (Hp53int1).

== Clinical significance ==
There is evidence that the Hp53int1 gene is involved in tumor suppression. Hp53int1 overlaps with TP53 exon 1 (TAD1). Mutations within this region can result in alternative exon expression or incomplete splicing and a loss of tumor suppressor function. Regarding osteosarcoma, these rearrangements within TAD1 have been detected in ~20% of the cases involving incomplete splicing of TP53. These rearrangements are located across the full sequence of TP53 intron 1, but the majority of them will cluster in a domain of the Hp53int1 transcript, suggesting that these rearrangements may be facilitated by chromatin conformation within this locus
