= DREAM complex =

Protein complex

The dimerization partner, RB-like, E2F and multi-vulval class B (DREAM) complex is a protein complex responsible for the regulation of cell cycle-dependent gene expression. The complex is evolutionarily conserved, although some of its components vary from species to species. In humans, the key proteins in the complex are RBL1 (p107) and RBL2 (p130), both of which are homologs of RB (p105) and bind repressive E2F transcription factors E2F4 and E2F5; DP1, DP2 and DP3, dimerization partners of E2F; and MuvB, which is a complex of LIN9/37/52/54 and RBBP4.

== Discovery ==
Genes encoding the MuvB complex were originally identified from loss-of-function mutation studies in C. elegans. When mutated, these genes produced worms with multiple vulva-like organs, hence the name 'Muv'. Three classes of Muv genes were classified, with class B genes encoding homologues of mammalian RB, E2F, and DP1, and others such as LIN-54, LIN-37, LIN-7 and LIN-52, whose functions were not yet understood.

Studies in Drosophila melanogaster ovarian follicle cells identified a protein complex that bound to repeatedly amplifying chorion genes. The complex included genes that had close homology with the MuvB genes such as Mip130, Mip120 and Mip40. These Mip genes were identified as homologues of the MuvB genes LIN9, LIN54, and LIN37 respectively. Further studies in the fly embryo nuclear extracts confirmed the coexistence of these proteins with others such as the RB homologues Rbf1 and Rbf2, and others like E2f and Dp. The protein complex was thus termed as the Drosophila RBF, E2f2 and Mip (dREAM) complex. Disruption of the dREAM complex through RNAi knockdown of the components of dREAM complex led to higher expression of E2f regulated genes that are typically silenced, implicating dREAM's role in gene down-regulation. Later in Drosophila melanogaster, there was also found a testis-specific paralog of the Myb-MuvB/DREAM complex known as tMAC (testis-specific meiotic arrest complex), which is involved in meiotic arrest.

A protein complex similar to dREAM was subsequently identified in C. elegans extract containing DP, RB, and MuvB, and was named as DRM. This complex included mammalian homologues of RB and DP, and other members of the MuvB complex.

The mammalian DREAM complex was identified following immunoprecipitation of p130 with mass-spectrometry analysis. The results showed that p130 was associated with E2F4, E2F5, the dimerization partner DP, and LIN9, LIN54, LIN37, LIN52, and RBBP4 that make up the MuvB complex. Immunoprecipitation of MuvB factors also revealed association of BMYB. Subsequent immunoprecipitation with BMYB yielded all the MuvB core proteins, but not other members of the DREAM complex – p130, p107, E2F4/5 and DP. This indicated that MuvB associated with BMYB to form the BMYB-MuvB complex or with p130/p107, E2F4/5 and DP to form the DREAM complex. The DREAM complex was found prevalent in quiescent or starved cells, and the BMYB-MuvB complex was found in actively dividing cells, hinting at separate functionalities of these two complexes.

MuvB-like complexes were also recently discovered in Arabidoposis that include E2F and MYB orthologs combined with LIN9 and LIN54 orthologs.

== Function ==
The main function of the DREAM complex is to repress G1/S and G2/M gene expression during quiescence (G_{0}). Entry into the cell cycle dissociates p130 from the complex and leads to subsequent recruitment of activating E2F proteins. This allows for the expression of E2F regulated late G1 and S phase genes. BMYB (MYBL2), which is repressed by the DREAM complex during G_{0} is also able to be expressed at this time, and binds to MuvB during S phase to promote the expression of key G_{2}/M phase genes such as CDK1 and CCNB1. FOXM1 is then recruited in G_{2} to further promote gene expression (e.g. AURKA). During late S phase BMYB is degraded via CUL1 (SCF complex), while FOXM1 is degraded during mitosis by the APC/C. Near the end of the cell cycle, the DREAM complex is re-assembled by DYRK1A to repress G1/S and G2/M genes.

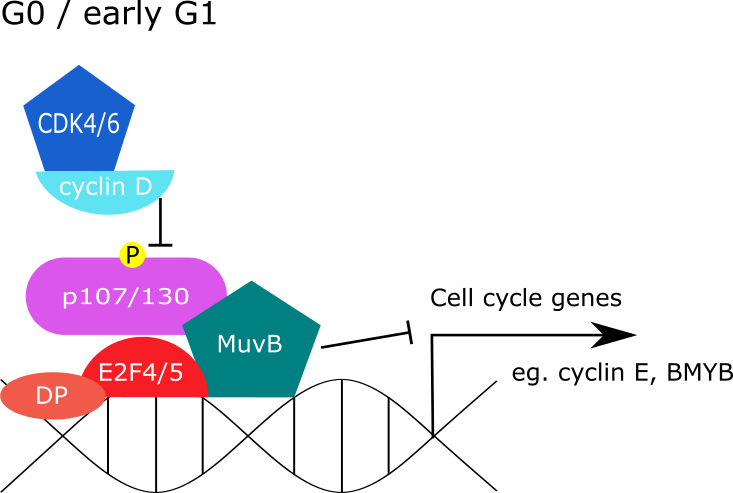
Mammalian DREAM complex in G0 and early G1

=== G0 ===
During quiescence, the DREAM complex represses G1/S and G2/M gene expression. In mammalian systems, chromatin-immunoprecipitation (ChIP) studies have revealed that DREAM components are found together at promoters of genes that peak in G1/S or G2/M phase. Abrogation of the DREAM complex on the other hand, led to increased expression of E2F regulated genes normally repressed in the G0 phase. Contrary to mammalian cells, the fly dREAM complex was found at almost one-third of all promoters, which may reflect a broader role for dREAM in gene regulation, such as programmed cell death of neural precursor cells.

Docking of the DREAM complex to promoters is achieved by binding of LIN-54 to regions known as cell cycle genes homology region (CHR). These are specific sequence of nucleotides that are commonly found in the promoters of genes expressed during late S phase or G2/M phase. Docking can also be achieved via E2F proteins binding to sequences known as cell cycle-dependent element sites (CDEs). Some cell cycle dependent genes have been found where both CHRs and CDEs are in proximity to one another. Because p130-E2F4 can form stable associations with the MuvB complex, the proximity of CHRs to CDEs suggests that affinity of binding of the DREAM complex to target genes is cooperatively improved by association with both the binding sites.

When DREAM is docked onto the promoter, p130 is bound to LIN52, and this association inhibits LIN52 binding to chromatin modifier proteins. Therefore, unlike RB-E2F, the DREAM complex is unlikely to directly recruit chromatin modifiers to repress gene expression, although some associations have been suggested. DREAM complex may instead down-regulate gene expression by affecting nucleosome positioning. Compacted DNA at transcription start sites inhibit gene expression by blocking the docking of RNA polymerase. In worms for example, loss of a MuvB complex protein, LIN35, leads to loss of repressive histone associations and high expression of cell cycle dependent genes. However, direct evidence for the link between repressive histones and the DREAM complex remains to be elucidated.

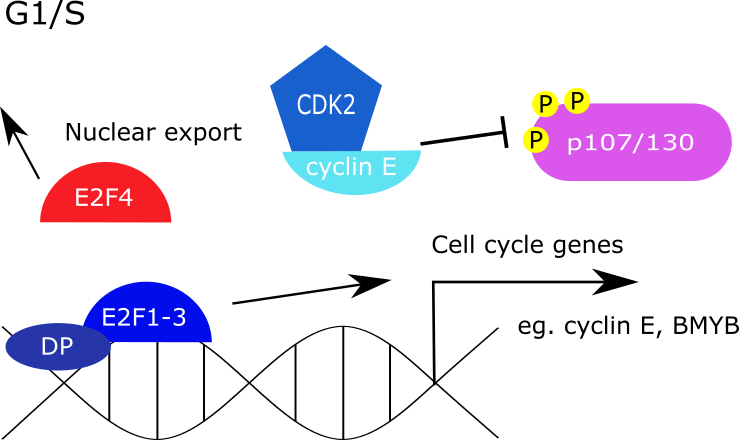
Mammalian DREAM complex disassembly in G1/S

=== G1/S ===
Like its counterpart, RB-E2F, the DREAM complex is also affected by similar growth stimuli and subsequent cyclin-CDK activity. Increasing cyclin D-CDK4 and cyclin E-CDK2 activity dissociates the DREAM complex from the promoter by phosphorylation of p130. Hyper-phosphorylated p130 is subsequently degraded and E2F4 exported from the nucleus. Once the repressive E2Fs are vacated, activating E2Fs bind to the promoter to up-regulate G1/S genes that promote DNA synthesis and transition of the cell cycle. BMYB is also up-regulated during this time, which then binds to genes that peak at G2/M phase. Binding of BMYB to late cell cycle genes is dependent on its association with the MuvB core to form the BMYB-MuvB complex, which is then able to up-regulate genes in the G2/M phase.

=== Late mitosis ===
Near the end of mitosis, p130 and p107 are dephosphorylated from their hyperphosphorylated state by the phosphatase PP2a. Inhibition of PP2a activity reduced promoter binding of some of the proteins of the DREAM complex in the subsequent G1 phase and de-repression of gene expression.

Other components have been shown to be phosphorylated for DREAM complex assembly to occur. Of these, LIN52 phosphorylation on its S28 residue is the most well-understood. Substitution of this serine to alanine led to reduced binding of the MuvB core to p130 and impaired the ability of cells to enter quiescence. This indicates that LIN52 S28 phosphorylation is required for proper association and function of the DREAM complex via binding with p130. One known regulator of phosphorylation of the S28 residue is the DYRK1A. The loss of this kinase leads to decreased phosphorylation of the S28 residue and association of p130 with MuvB. DYRK1A was also found to degrade cyclin D1, which would increase p21 levels – both of which contribute to cell cycle exit.

The DREAM complex was also shown to regulate cytokinesis through GAS2L3.

== Cancer therapy ==
Due to its regulatory role in the cell cycle, targeting the DREAM complex might enhance anticancer treatments such as imatinib.

== See also ==
- Pocket protein family
