= Transcription factor DP =

DP
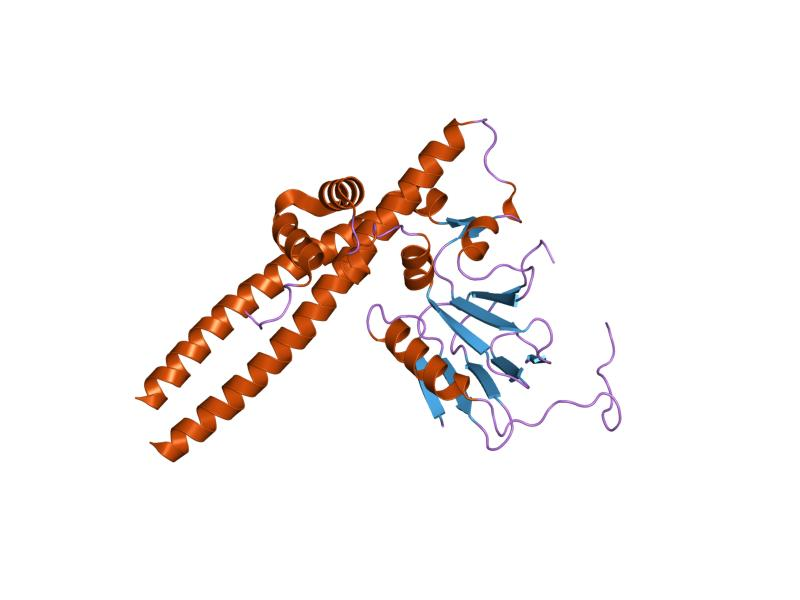
- structure of the rb c-terminal domain bound to an e2f1-dp1 heterodimer

Identifiers
- Symbol: DP
- Pfam: PF08781
- InterPro: IPR014889
- PROSITE: PDOC00359
- MEROPS: S9
- SCOP2: 1c5e / SCOPe / SUPFAM
- CAZy: GT1
Available protein structures:
- PDB: IPR014889 PF08781 (ECOD; PDBsum)
- AlphaFold: IPR014889; PF08781

In molecular biology, transcription factor DP (Dimerization Partner) is a family of proteins which function as transcription factors. DP forms a heterodimer with E2F and regulates genes involved in cell cycle progression. The transcriptional activity of E2F is inhibited by the retinoblastoma protein which binds to the E2F-DP heterodimer and negatively regulates the G1-S transition.

== See also ==
- E2F
- TFDP1
- TFDP2
