= TFDP =

TFDP may refer to:

- Task Force Detainees of the Philippines
- "T.F.D.P.", a Charlie Brown Jr. track from Abalando a Sua Fábrica, 2001
- TFDP1 (transcription factor Dp-1)
- TFDP2 (transcription factor Dp-2)
