= Guillermina Lozano =

American geneticist

- Education: Pan American University (BSc); Rutgers University (PhD)
- Awards: Distinguished Research in the Biomedical Sciences, Association of American Medical Colleges (AAMC) (2022); Fellow, American Association for Cancer Research (AACR) (2021); Member, American Academy of Arts and Sciences (2020); Member, National Academy of Sciences (2017); Member, National Academy of Medicine, (2014)
- Scientific career
- Workplaces: University of Texas MD Anderson Cancer Center
- Thesis: Isolation, characterization and analysis of the gene encoding the Alpha 2 type IX collagen polypeptide (1986)

Guillermina 'Gigi' Lozano is an American geneticist. She is a Professor at Hubert L. Olive Stringer Distinguished Chair in Oncology in Honor of Sue Gribble Stringer at the University of Texas MD Anderson Cancer Center, Houston, Texas. Lozano is recognized for her studies of the p53 tumor suppressor pathway, characterizing the protein as a regulator of gene expression (transcription factor) and that is disturbed in many cancers. She was the first to recognize that the p53 gene encoded a transcriptional activator of other genes Her lab has made significant contributions by developing and analyzing mouse models to study the activities of mutant p53, revealing how these mutations drive tumor development and progression. She also found out how the Mdm2 and Mdm4 proteins work in the body, especially in stopping cancer and controlling p53. This research suggested that blocking Mdm2/4 could be a new way to treat cancer.

== Early life and education ==
Lozano was born in East Chicago, Indiana, the daughter of Mexican immigrants. She attended a private Catholic high school, Bishop Noll, up until her senior year, when her family moved to McAllen, Texas.

Lozano completed a Bachelor of Science in biology and mathematics, graduating Magna Cum Laude, at Pan American University (now University of Texas Rio Grande Valley) in 1979. She earned a doctor of philosophy in biochemistry from Rutgers University and University of Medicine and Dentistry of New Jersey in 1986. Lozano's dissertation was titled Isolation, characterization and analysis of the gene encoding the Alpha 2 type IX collagen polypeptide. She completed postgraduate training in molecular biology at Princeton University from 1985 to 1987.

== Career and research ==
Lozano is Professor and Chair of the Department of Genetics at University of Texas MD Anderson Cancer Center. She is also a professor at University of Texas MD Anderson Cancer Center UTHealth Graduate School of Biomedical Sciences.

Lozano is recognised for her studies of the p53 tumour suppressor pathway, from characterising p53 as a transcriptional activator to revealing the importance of two inhibitors of p53, Mdm2 and Mdm4. Her lab has generated dozens of mouse models of p53 to explore effects of mutations in this tumor-suppressing protein on tumorogeneis.

== Awards and honours ==
Lozano is a member of the National Academy of Sciences, National Academy of Medicine, Academy of Medicine, Engineering and Science of Texas.

Awards:

- 2024 - Distinguished Alumnus Award, The University of Texas-Rio Grande Valley
- 2022 - Margaret Pittman Lecture Award, National Institutes of Health (NIH)
- 2022 - The Award for Distinguished Research in the Biomedical Sciences, Association of American Medical Colleges (AAMC)
- 2021 - Elected to Fellows of the American Association for Cancer Research (AACR)
- 2020 - Elected as a member of the American Academy of Arts and Sciences
- 2018 - President's Leadership Award for Advancing Women and Minority Faculty, University of Texas MD Anderson Cancer Center.
- 2018 - E.E Just Lecture Award, The American Society for Cell Biology.
- 2017 - Elected as a member of the National Academy of Sciences
- 2014 - Elected as a member of the National Academy of Medicine
- 2013 - AACR-Women in Cancer Research Charlotte Friend Memorial Lectureship. The award is presented by the American Association for Cancer Research to an outstanding scientist who has made significant contributions to the field of cancer and who has, through leader or by example, furthered the advancement of women in science.
- 2013 - Earned the Minorities in Cancer Research Jane Cooke Lectureship.
- 2011 - AACR-Minorities in Cancer Research Jane Cook Wright Memorial Lectureship, an award that recognises an outstanding scientist who has, through leadership or by example, furthered the advancement of minority investigators in cancer research.
