= Retinoblastoma-like protein 2 =

Protein-coding gene in the species Homo sapiens

RBL2

Identifiers
- Aliases: RBL2, P130, Rb2, retinoblastoma-like 2, RB transcriptional corepressor like 2, BRUWAG
- External IDs: OMIM: 180203; MGI: 105085; GeneCards: RBL2
Available structures
| PDB | Ortholog search: PDBe RCSB |
| PDB | List of PDB id codes 4XI9, 5C1D |

Gene location (Human)
| Chr. | Chromosome 16 (human) |
| Band | 16q12.2 | Start | 53,433,977 bp |
| Band | 16q12.2 | End | 53,491,648 bp |

Gene location (Mouse)
| Chr. | Chromosome 8 (mouse) |
| Band | 8 C4|8 44.25 cM | Start | 91,796,685 bp |
| Band | 8 C4|8 44.25 cM | End | 91,850,472 bp |
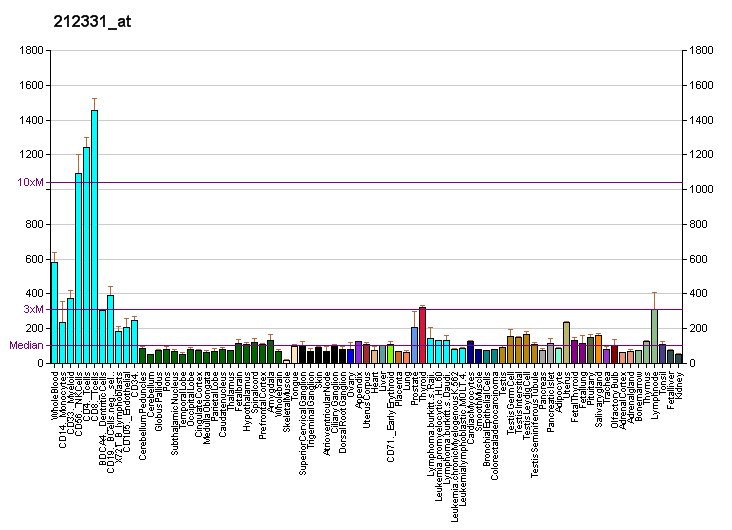

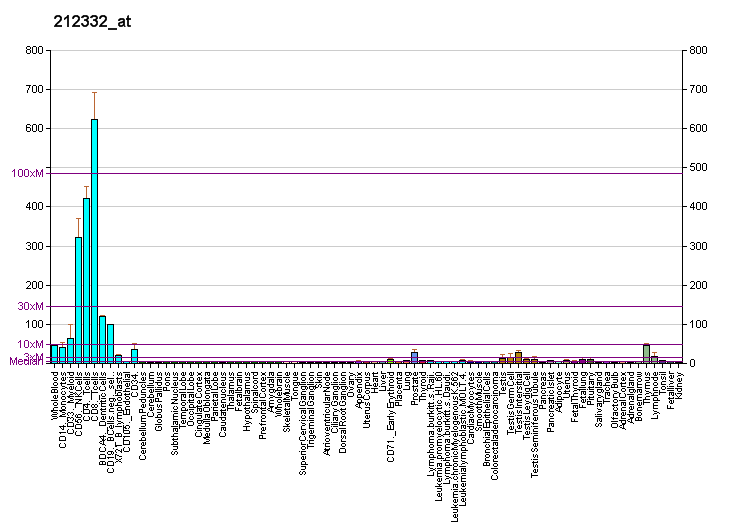
RNA expression pattern
| Bgee | Human / Mouse (ortholog); Top expressed in: germinal epithelium; superficial temporal artery; epithelium of nasopharynx; Achilles tendon; lymph node; cardia; tonsil; body of pancreas; pylorus; mucosa of paranasal sinus / Top expressed in: parotid gland; muscle of thigh; spermatid; saccule; medial head of gastrocnemius muscle; submandibular gland; stroma of bone marrow; temporal muscle; triceps brachii muscle; thymus; More reference expression data |
| BioGPS | More reference expression data |
Gene ontology
| Molecular function | DNA binding; protein binding; promoter-specific chromatin binding; DNA-binding transcription repressor activity, RNA polymerase II-specific |
| Cellular component | nucleolus; extracellular exosome; nucleus; transcription regulator complex; nucleoplasm; cytosol; chromatin |
| Biological process | regulation of transcription by RNA polymerase II; regulation of cell cycle; cell cycle; regulation of transcription, DNA-templated; transcription, DNA-templated; regulation of lipid kinase activity; DNA damage response, signal transduction by p53 class mediator resulting in cell cycle arrest; negative regulation of gene expression; negative regulation of transcription by RNA polymerase II; chromatin organization; regulation of mitotic cell cycle; cell differentiation; regulation of cell division; negative regulation of G1/S transition of mitotic cell cycle |
Sources:Amigo / QuickGO
Orthologs
| Databases | NCBI: entry; OMA: entry |
| Species | Human | Mouse |
| Entrez | 5934 | 19651 |
| Ensembl | ENSG00000103479 | ENSMUSG00000031666 |
| UniProt | Q08999 | Q64700 |
| RefSeq (mRNA) | NM_005611; NM_001323608; NM_001323609; NM_001323610; NM_001323611 | NM_001282000; NM_001282001; NM_011250 |
| RefSeq (protein) | NP_001310537; NP_001310538; NP_001310539; NP_001310540; NP_005602 | NP_001268929; NP_001268930; NP_035380 |
| Location (UCSC) | Chr 16: 53.43 – 53.49 Mb | Chr 8: 91.8 – 91.85 Mb |
| PubMed search |
- Wikidata
| View/Edit Human | View/Edit Mouse |

Retinoblastoma-like protein 2 is a protein that in humans is encoded by the RBL2 gene. RBL2 is one of three retinoblastoma proteins encoded in the human genome (along with Rb and RBL1).

== Interactions ==
Retinoblastoma-like protein 2 has been shown to interact with:

- BRCA1,
- BRF1
- C-Raf,
- Cyclin E1,
- Cyclin-dependent kinase 2,
- HDAC1,
- Prohibitin, and
- RBBP8.

== Human disease ==
Mutations in RBL2 have been linked to a severe neurodevelopmental disorder characterised by morphological and behavioural abnormalities. Symptoms include intellectual disability, developmental delay, microcephaly, dysmorphic features, gait abnormalities, and seizures.

The genetic basis of RBL2-linked disease is caused by bi-allelic loss-of-function mutations (including nonsense mutations, frameshifts, splicing mutations, and deletions.

RBL2-linked disease is a rare genetic disorder with only 35 patients identified worldwide (2025).

== See also ==
- Pocket protein family
