= NPDC1 =

Protein-coding gene in the species Homo sapiens

Identifiers
- Aliases: NPDC1, CAB, CAB-, CAB-1, CAB1, NPDC-1, neural proliferation, differentiation and control, 1, neural proliferation, differentiation and control 1
- External IDs: OMIM: 605798; MGI: 1099802; HomoloGene: 32050; GeneCards: NPDC1; OMA:NPDC1 - orthologs

Gene location (Human)
Chr.	Chromosome 9 (human)
Band	9q34.3	Start	137,039,463 bp
Band	9q34.3	End	137,046,179 bp

Gene location (Mouse)
Chr.	Chromosome 2 (mouse)
Band	2|2 A3	Start	25,289,363 bp
Band	2|2 A3	End	25,299,506 bp
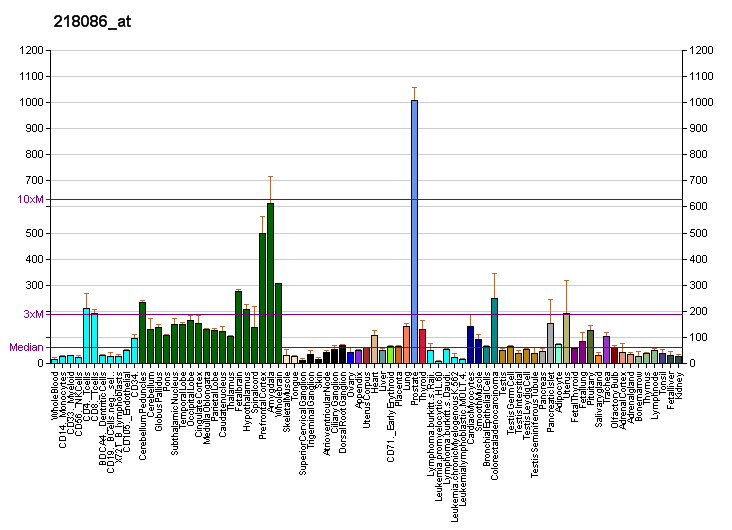
RNA expression pattern
Bgee	Human / Mouse (ortholog); Top expressed in: right hemisphere of cerebellum; pituitary gland; anterior pituitary; right frontal lobe; prostate; Brodmann area 9; cerebellar vermis; primary visual cortex; hypothalamus; right uterine tube / Top expressed in: dentate gyrus of hippocampal formation granule cell; primary visual cortex; superior frontal gyrus; cerebellar cortex; perirhinal cortex; entorhinal cortex; CA3 field; superior colliculus; ventromedial nucleus; primary motor cortex; More reference expression data
BioGPS	More reference expression data
Gene ontology
Molecular function	protein binding
Cellular component	membrane; integral component of membrane; plasma membrane
Biological process	regulation of immune response
Sources:Amigo / QuickGO
Orthologs
Species	Human	Mouse
Entrez	56654	18146
Ensembl	ENSG00000107281	ENSMUSG00000015094
UniProt	Q9NQX5	Q64322
RefSeq (mRNA)	NM_015392	NM_008721
RefSeq (protein)	NP_056207	NP_032747
Location (UCSC)	Chr 9: 137.04 – 137.05 Mb	Chr 2: 25.29 – 25.3 Mb
PubMed search
- Wikidata
View/Edit Human	View/Edit Mouse

Neural proliferation differentiation and control protein 1 is a protein that in humans is encoded by the NPDC1 gene.

== Interactions ==
NPDC1 has been shown to interact with E2F1.
