= Sp4 transcription factor =

Protein-coding gene in the species Homo sapiens

SP4
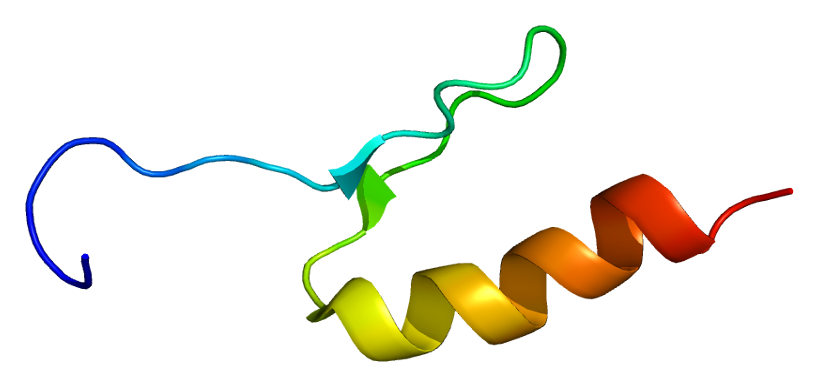

Identifiers
- Aliases: SP4, HF1B, SPR-1, Sp4 transcription factor
- External IDs: OMIM: 600540; MGI: 107595; GeneCards: SP4

Gene location (Human)
Chr.	Chromosome 7 (human)
Band	7p15.3	Start	21,428,043 bp
Band	7p15.3	End	21,514,822 bp

Gene location (Mouse)
Chr.	Chromosome 12 (mouse)
Band	12 F2|12 63.48 cM	Start	118,198,668 bp
Band	12 F2|12 63.48 cM	End	118,265,175 bp
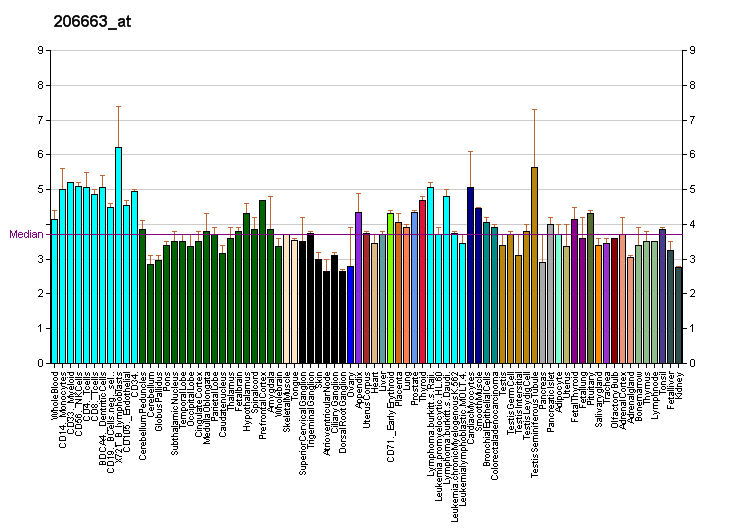
RNA expression pattern
Bgee	Human / Mouse (ortholog); Top expressed in: cerebellar vermis; germinal epithelium; superficial temporal artery; retinal pigment epithelium; Skeletal muscle tissue of rectus abdominis; trabecular bone; endothelial cell; mucosa of paranasal sinus; Brodmann area 23; biceps brachii / Top expressed in: Rostral migratory stream; gastrula; retinal pigment epithelium; ciliary body; neural layer of retina; tail of embryo; ganglionic eminence; genital tubercle; medial ganglionic eminence; granulocyte; More reference expression data
BioGPS	More reference expression data
Gene ontology
Molecular function	nucleic acid binding; DNA-binding transcription factor activity; DNA binding; transcription coactivator activity; protein binding; metal ion binding; sequence-specific DNA binding; DNA-binding transcription factor activity, RNA polymerase II-specific
Cellular component	nucleus; nucleoplasm; cytosol
Biological process	regulation of transcription by RNA polymerase II; regulation of transcription, DNA-templated; transcription, DNA-templated; positive regulation of nucleic acid-templated transcription
Sources:Amigo / QuickGO
Orthologs
Databases	NCBI: entry; OMA: entry
Species	Human	Mouse
Entrez	6671	20688
Ensembl	ENSG00000105866	ENSMUSG00000025323
UniProt	Q02446	Q62445
RefSeq (mRNA)	NM_003112; NM_001326542; NM_001326543	NM_001166385; NM_009239
RefSeq (protein)	NP_001313471; NP_001313472; NP_003103	n/a
Location (UCSC)	Chr 7: 21.43 – 21.51 Mb	Chr 12: 118.2 – 118.27 Mb
PubMed search
- Wikidata
View/Edit Human	View/Edit Mouse

Transcription factor Sp4 is a protein that in humans is encoded by the SP4 gene.

== Interactions ==
Sp4 transcription factor has been shown to interact with E2F1.
