= ARID3A =

Protein-coding gene in humans

Identifiers
- Aliases: ARID3A, BRIGHT, DRIL1, DRIL3, E2FBP1, AT-rich interaction domain 3A
- External IDs: OMIM: 603265; MGI: 1328360; GeneCards: ARID3A
Available structures
| PDB | Ortholog search: PDBe RCSB |
| PDB | List of PDB id codes 2KK0, 4LJX |

Gene location (Human)
| Chr. | Chromosome 19 (human) |
| Band | 19p13.3 | Start | 925,781 bp |
| Band | 19p13.3 | End | 975,939 bp |

Gene location (Mouse)
| Chr. | Chromosome 10 (mouse) |
| Band | 10|10 C1 | Start | 79,762,877 bp |
| Band | 10|10 C1 | End | 79,790,852 bp |
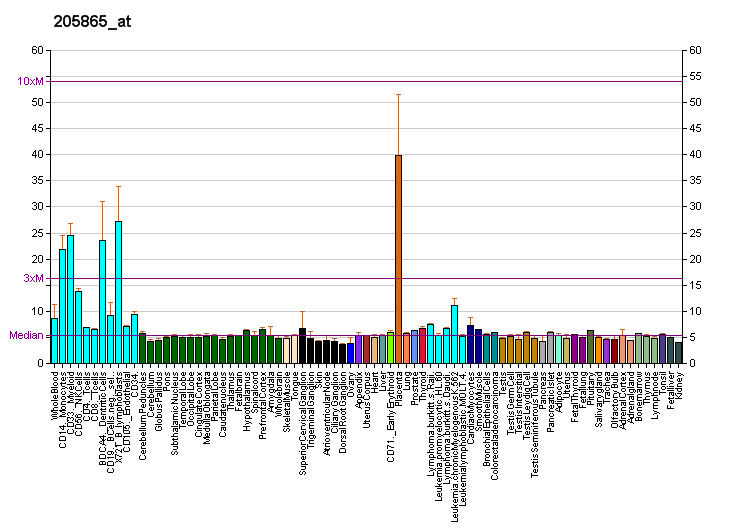
RNA expression pattern
| Bgee | Human / Mouse (ortholog); Top expressed in: monocyte; blood; placenta; bone marrow cell; left testis; right testis; stromal cell of endometrium; buccal mucosa cell; granulocyte; sural nerve / Top expressed in: ovarian follicle; granulocyte; tibiofemoral joint; tail of embryo; yolk sac; germinal epithelium; gastrula; genital tubercle; ovarian follicle; placenta; More reference expression data |
| BioGPS | More reference expression data |
Gene ontology
| Molecular function | protein homodimerization activity; DNA binding; protein binding; chromatin binding; DNA-binding transcription factor activity; RNA polymerase II transcription regulatory region sequence-specific DNA binding; DNA-binding transcription activator activity, RNA polymerase II-specific; DNA-binding transcription factor activity, RNA polymerase II-specific |
| Cellular component | membrane raft; nucleus; nucleoplasm; cytoplasm; cytosol; intracellular membrane-bounded organelle |
| Biological process | positive regulation of transcription by RNA polymerase II; transcription, DNA-templated; regulation of transcription, DNA-templated; transcription by RNA polymerase II; DNA damage response, signal transduction by p53 class mediator resulting in cell cycle arrest |
Sources:Amigo / QuickGO
Orthologs
| Databases | NCBI: entry; OMA: entry |
| Species | Human | Mouse |
| Entrez | 1820 | 13496 |
| Ensembl | ENSG00000116017 | ENSMUSG00000019564 |
| UniProt | Q99856 | Q62431 |
| RefSeq (mRNA) | NM_005224 | NM_001288625; NM_001288626; NM_007880 |
| RefSeq (protein) | NP_005215 | NP_001275554; NP_001275555; NP_031906 |
| Location (UCSC) | Chr 19: 0.93 – 0.98 Mb | Chr 10: 79.76 – 79.79 Mb |
| PubMed search |
- Wikidata
| View/Edit Human | View/Edit Mouse |

AT-rich interactive domain-containing protein 3A is a protein that in humans is encoded by the ARID3A gene.

== Function ==
This gene encodes a member of the ARID (AT-rich interaction domain) family of DNA binding proteins. It was found by homology to the Drosophila dead ringer gene, which is important for normal embryogenesis. Other ARID family members have roles in embryonic patterning, cell lineage gene regulation, cell cycle control, transcriptional regulation, and possibly in chromatin structure modification.

== Interactions ==
ARID3A has been shown to interact with:

- BTK, and
- E2F1
