= Transcription factor III B =

Protein-coding gene in the species Homo sapiens

BRF1

Identifiers
- Aliases: BRF1, BRF, BRF-1, GTF3B, HEL-S-76p, TAF3B2, TAF3C, TAFIII90, TF3B90, TFIIIB90, hBRF, CFDS, RNA polymerase III transcription initiation factor 90 kDa subunit, RNA polymerase III transcription initiation factor subunit, BRF1 RNA polymerase III transcription initiation factor subunit
- External IDs: OMIM: 604902; MGI: 1919558; GeneCards: BRF1

Gene location (Human)
Chr.	Chromosome 14 (human)
Band	14q32.33	Start	105,209,286 bp
Band	14q32.33	End	105,315,589 bp

Gene location (Mouse)
Chr.	Chromosome 12 (mouse)
Band	12|12 F1	Start	112,923,705 bp
Band	12|12 F1	End	112,964,324 bp
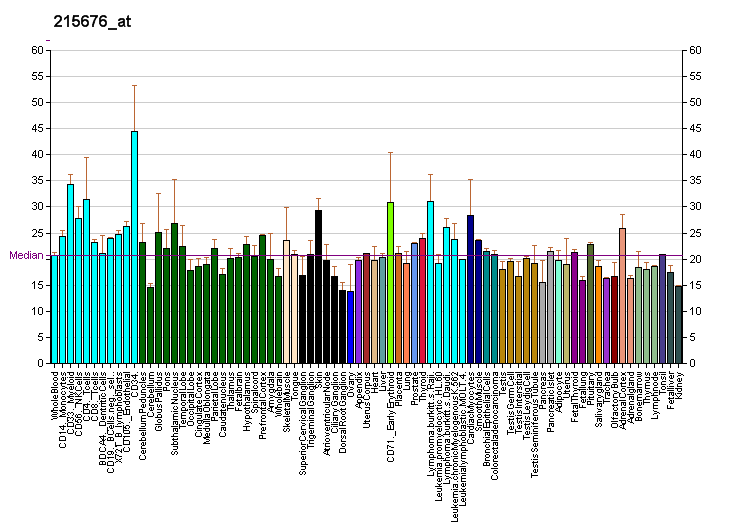

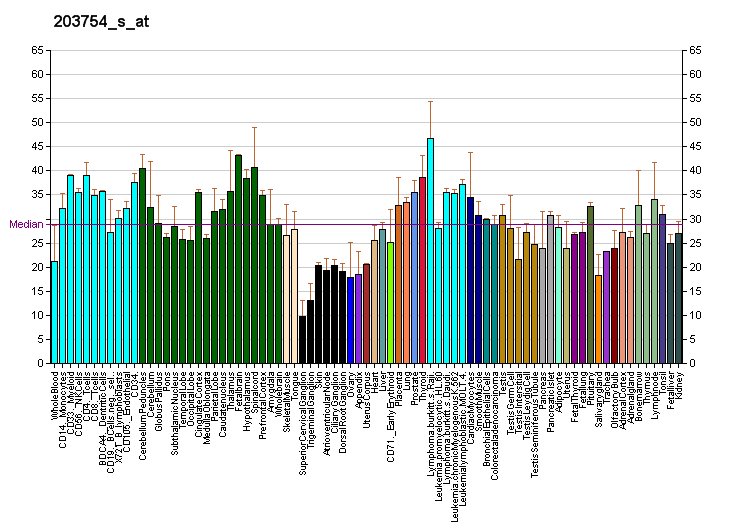

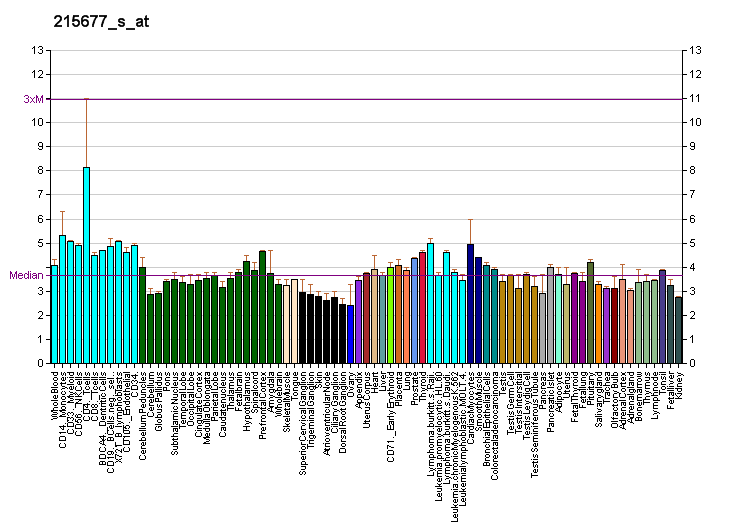
RNA expression pattern
Bgee	Human / Mouse (ortholog); Top expressed in: sural nerve; right uterine tube; right hemisphere of cerebellum; C1 segment; anterior pituitary; right frontal lobe; ventricular zone; ganglionic eminence; apex of heart; granulocyte / Top expressed in: interventricular septum; neural layer of retina; lens; thymus; granulocyte; lip; otolith organ; utricle; spermatocyte; hand; More reference expression data
BioGPS	More reference expression data
Gene ontology
Molecular function	TBP-class protein binding; metal ion binding; RNA polymerase III general transcription initiation factor activity; RNA polymerase III type 3 promoter sequence-specific DNA binding; transcription factor binding; protein binding; translation initiation factor activity
Cellular component	transcription factor TFIIIB complex; nucleus; nucleoplasm
Biological process	rRNA transcription; tRNA transcription; regulation of transcription, DNA-templated; transcription, DNA-templated; positive regulation of transcription by RNA polymerase III; transcription by RNA polymerase III; transcription initiation from RNA polymerase III promoter; transcription preinitiation complex assembly; DNA-templated transcription, initiation; RNA polymerase III preinitiation complex assembly; regulation of transcription by RNA polymerase III; translational initiation
Sources:Amigo / QuickGO
Orthologs
Databases	NCBI: entry; OMA: entry
Species	Human	Mouse
Entrez	2972	72308
Ensembl	ENSG00000185024	ENSMUSG00000011158
UniProt	Q92994	Q8CFK2
RefSeq (mRNA)	NM_001242786; NM_001242787; NM_001242788; NM_001242789; NM_001242790 NM_001519; NM_145685; NM_145696	NM_028193
RefSeq (protein)	NP_001229715; NP_001229716; NP_001229717; NP_001229718; NP_001229719 NP_001510; NP_663718; NP_663718.1	NP_082469
Location (UCSC)	Chr 14: 105.21 – 105.32 Mb	Chr 12: 112.92 – 112.96 Mb
PubMed search
- Wikidata
View/Edit Human	View/Edit Mouse

Transcription factor IIIB 90 kDa subunit is a protein that in humans is encoded by the BRF1 gene.

== Function ==
This gene encodes one of the three subunits of the RNA polymerase III transcription factor complex. This complex plays a central role in transcription initiation by RNA polymerase III on genes encoding tRNA, 5S rRNA, and other small structural RNAs. The gene product belongs to the TF2B family. Three alternatively spliced variants encoding three different isoforms, that function at different promoters transcribed by RNA polymerase III, have been identified. A transcript encoding a fourth isoform has not yet been completely characterized.

== Interactions ==
BRF1 (gene) has been shown to interact with:

- RB1,
- RBL1,
- RBL2, and
- TBP
