= RBBP8 =

Protein-coding gene in the species Homo sapiens

Identifiers
- Aliases: RBBP8, COM1, CTIP, JWDS, RIM, SAE2, SCKL2, retinoblastoma binding protein 8, RB binding protein 8, endonuclease
- External IDs: OMIM: 604124; MGI: 2442995; GeneCards: RBBP8
Available structures
PDB	Ortholog search: PDBe RCSB
PDB	List of PDB id codes 2L4Z, 4D2H

Gene location (Human)
Chr.	Chromosome 18 (human)
Band	18q11.2	Start	22,798,261 bp
Band	18q11.2	End	23,026,488 bp

Gene location (Mouse)
Chr.	Chromosome 18 (mouse)
Band	18|18 A1	Start	11,766,333 bp
Band	18|18 A1	End	11,878,278 bp
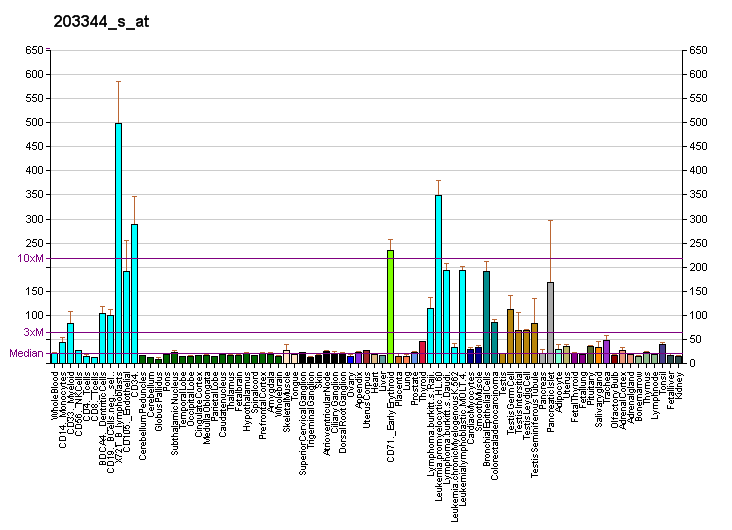
RNA expression pattern
Bgee	Human / Mouse (ortholog); Top expressed in: Epithelium of choroid plexus; gonad; testicle; kidney tubule; caput epididymis; epithelium of lactiferous gland; skin of hip; lactiferous duct; ventricular zone; islet of Langerhans / Top expressed in: genital tubercle; tail of embryo; vestibular sensory epithelium; zygote; urothelium; medullary collecting duct; primitive streak; spermatocyte; secondary oocyte; transitional epithelium of urinary bladder; More reference expression data
BioGPS	More reference expression data
Gene ontology
Molecular function	nuclease activity; hydrolase activity; endonuclease activity; transcription corepressor activity; damaged DNA binding; DNA binding; protein binding; single-stranded DNA endodeoxyribonuclease activity; identical protein binding; Y-form DNA binding; double-strand/single-strand DNA junction binding; double-stranded DNA binding; single-stranded DNA binding; flap-structured DNA binding
Cellular component	transcription repressor complex; chromosome; nucleus; nucleoplasm; intracellular membrane-bounded organelle; site of double-strand break
Biological process	cell cycle; DNA repair; nucleotide-excision repair; cell division; nucleic acid phosphodiester bond hydrolysis; response to estradiol; meiosis; regulation of transcription by RNA polymerase II; cellular response to DNA damage stimulus; blastocyst hatching; DNA double-strand break processing; DNA replication; DNA double-strand break processing involved in repair via single-strand annealing; negative regulation of transcription by RNA polymerase II; double-strand break repair via homologous recombination; negative regulation of G0 to G1 transition; negative regulation of nucleic acid-templated transcription; G1/S transition of mitotic cell cycle; regulation of signal transduction by p53 class mediator
Sources:Amigo / QuickGO
Orthologs
Databases	NCBI: entry; OMA: entry
Species	Human	Mouse
Entrez	5932	225182
Ensembl	ENSG00000101773	ENSMUSG00000041238
UniProt	Q99708	Q80YR6
RefSeq (mRNA)	NM_002894; NM_203291; NM_203292	NM_001081223; NM_001252495; NM_175458
RefSeq (protein)	NP_002885; NP_976036; NP_976037; NP_002885.1; NP_976036.1	NP_001074692; NP_001239424
Location (UCSC)	Chr 18: 22.8 – 23.03 Mb	Chr 18: 11.77 – 11.88 Mb
PubMed search
- Wikidata
View/Edit Human	View/Edit Mouse

Retinoblastoma-binding protein 8 is a protein that in humans is encoded by the RBBP8 gene.

== Function ==
The protein encoded by this gene is a ubiquitously expressed nuclear protein. It is found among several proteins that bind directly to retinoblastoma protein, which regulates cell proliferation. This protein complexes with transcriptional co-repressor CTBP. It is also associated with BRCA1 and is thought to modulate the functions of BRCA1 in transcriptional regulation, DNA repair, and/or cell cycle checkpoint control. It is suggested that this gene may itself be a tumor suppressor acting in the same pathway as BRCA1. Three transcript variants encoding two different isoforms have been found for this gene. More transcript variants exist, but their full-length natures have not been determined.

=== DNA repair ===
RBBP8 is involved in the DNA repair process of homologous recombination. It was proposed that, in gastric cancer cells, inhibition of RBBP8 expression could cause a synthetic lethal effect along with PARP inhibitor treatment.

== Interactions ==
RBBP8 has been shown to interact with:

- ATM,
- BRCA1,
- CTBP1,
- LMO4,
- RB1,
- RBL1,
- RBL2, and
- SIAH1
