= E2F1 =

Protein-coding gene in the species Homo sapiens

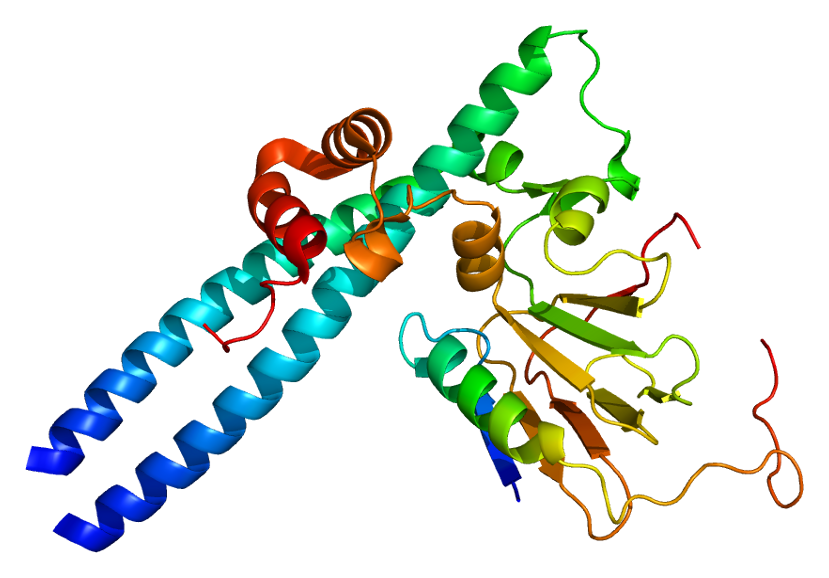

Identifiers
- Aliases: E2F1, E2F-1, RBAP1, RBBP3, RBP3, E2F transcription factor 1
- External IDs: OMIM: 189971; MGI: 101941; GeneCards: E2F1
Available structures
PDB	Ortholog search: PDBe RCSB
PDB	List of PDB id codes 1H24, 1O9K, 2AZE

Gene location (Human)
Chr.	Chromosome 20 (human)
Band	20q11.22	Start	33,675,477 bp
Band	20q11.22	End	33,686,385 bp

Gene location (Mouse)
Chr.	Chromosome 2 (mouse)
Band	2 H1|2 76.79 cM	Start	154,401,327 bp
Band	2 H1|2 76.79 cM	End	154,411,812 bp
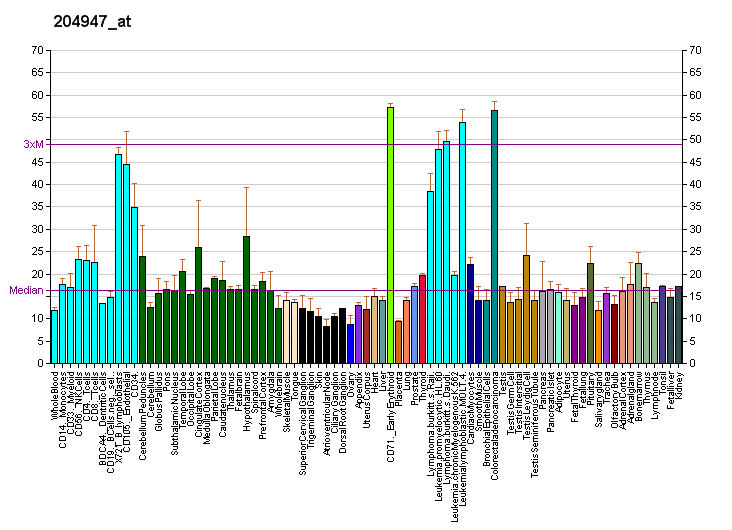

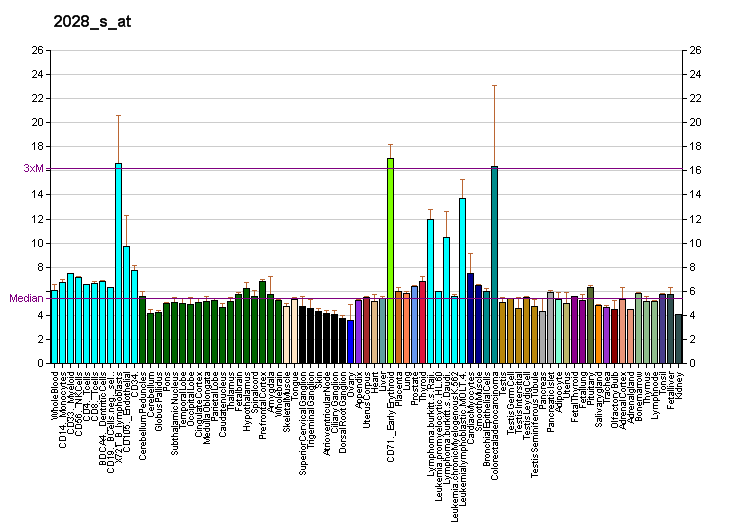
RNA expression pattern
Bgee	Human / Mouse (ortholog); Top expressed in: ganglionic eminence; secondary oocyte; ventricular zone; gonad; mucosa of transverse colon; stromal cell of endometrium; prefrontal cortex; testicle; bone marrow; putamen / Top expressed in: zygote; secondary oocyte; ectoderm; otic vesicle; otic placode; primary oocyte; fetal liver hematopoietic progenitor cell; ventricular zone; saccule; gastrula; More reference expression data
BioGPS	More reference expression data
Gene ontology
Molecular function	DNA binding; DNA-binding transcription factor activity; transcription factor binding; protein binding; protein dimerization activity; DNA-binding transcription repressor activity, RNA polymerase II-specific; sequence-specific DNA binding; DNA-binding transcription factor activity, RNA polymerase II-specific; protein kinase binding; cis-regulatory region sequence-specific DNA binding; DNA-binding transcription activator activity, RNA polymerase II-specific
Cellular component	cytoplasm; transcription regulator complex; Rb-E2F complex; nucleus; mitochondrion; nucleoplasm; centrosome; protein-containing complex; RNA polymerase II transcription regulator complex
Biological process	cellular response to nerve growth factor stimulus; negative regulation of fat cell differentiation; regulation of transcription, DNA-templated; lens fiber cell apoptotic process; negative regulation of transcription involved in G1/S transition of mitotic cell cycle; positive regulation of fibroblast proliferation; negative regulation of DNA binding; negative regulation of fat cell proliferation; DNA damage checkpoint signaling; cellular response to xenobiotic stimulus; negative regulation of transcription by RNA polymerase II; transcription, DNA-templated; regulation of cell cycle; positive regulation of transcription, DNA-templated; regulation of G1/S transition of mitotic cell cycle; mRNA stabilization; positive regulation of protein insertion into mitochondrial membrane involved in apoptotic signaling pathway; positive regulation of gene expression; cellular response to fatty acid; anoikis; spermatogenesis; intrinsic apoptotic signaling pathway in response to DNA damage; intrinsic apoptotic signaling pathway by p53 class mediator; cell cycle; forebrain development; negative regulation of transcription, DNA-templated; cellular response to hypoxia; positive regulation of transcription by RNA polymerase II; apoptotic process; DNA damage response, signal transduction by p53 class mediator resulting in cell cycle arrest; regulation of transcription involved in G1/S transition of mitotic cell cycle; positive regulation of apoptotic process; negative regulation of G0 to G1 transition; positive regulation of glial cell proliferation
Sources:Amigo / QuickGO
Orthologs
Databases	NCBI: entry; OMA: entry
Species	Human	Mouse
Entrez	1869	13555
Ensembl	ENSG00000101412	ENSMUSG00000027490
UniProt	Q01094	Q61501
RefSeq (mRNA)	NM_005225	NM_007891; NM_001291105
RefSeq (protein)	NP_005216	NP_001278034; NP_031917
Location (UCSC)	Chr 20: 33.68 – 33.69 Mb	Chr 2: 154.4 – 154.41 Mb
PubMed search
- Wikidata
View/Edit Human	View/Edit Mouse

Transcription factor E2F1 is a protein that in humans is encoded by the E2F1 gene.

== Function ==
The protein encoded by this gene is a member of the E2F family of transcription factors. The E2F family plays a crucial role in the control of cell cycle and action of tumor suppressor proteins and is also a target of the transforming proteins of small DNA tumor viruses. The E2F proteins contain several evolutionarily conserved domains found in most members of the family. These domains include a DNA binding domain, a dimerization domain which determines interaction with the differentiation regulated transcription factor proteins (DP), a transactivation domain enriched in acidic amino acids, and a tumor suppressor protein association domain which is embedded within the transactivation domain. This protein and another 2 members, E2F2 and E2F3, have an additional cyclin binding domain. This protein binds preferentially to retinoblastoma protein pRB in a cell-cycle dependent manner. It can mediate both cell proliferation and p53-dependent/independent apoptosis.

== Transcription ==
E2F1 promoter[PAX8] => E2F1

== Interactions ==
E2F1 has been shown to interact with:

- ARID3A,
- CUL1,
- Cyclin A1,
- Cyclin A2,
- GTF2H1,
- MDM4,
- NCOA6,
- NDN,
- NPDC1,
- PURA,
- PHB,
- RB1,
- UDG,
- RBL1,
- SKP2,
- SP1,
- SP2,
- SP3,
- SP4,
- TFDP1
- TOPBP1,
- TP53BP1, and
- UBC.

== See also ==
- E2F
- Retinoblastoma protein
