= Prohibitin =

Mammalian protein found in Homo sapiens

PHB1

Identifiers
- Aliases: PHB1, prohibitin, HEL-S-54e, HEL-215, PHB, prohibitin 1
- External IDs: OMIM: 176705; MGI: 97572; GeneCards: PHB1
Available structures
PDB	Ortholog search: PDBe RCSB
PDB	List of PDB id codes 1LU7

Gene location (Human)
Chr.	Chromosome 17 (human)
Band	17q21.33	Start	49,404,049 bp
Band	17q21.33	End	49,414,905 bp

Gene location (Mouse)
Chr.	Chromosome 11 (mouse)
Band	11 59.01 cM|11 D	Start	95,557,783 bp
Band	11 59.01 cM|11 D	End	95,571,599 bp
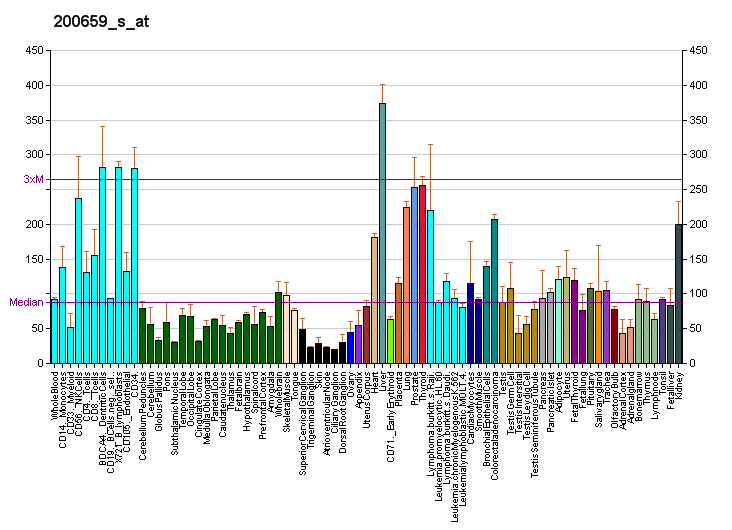

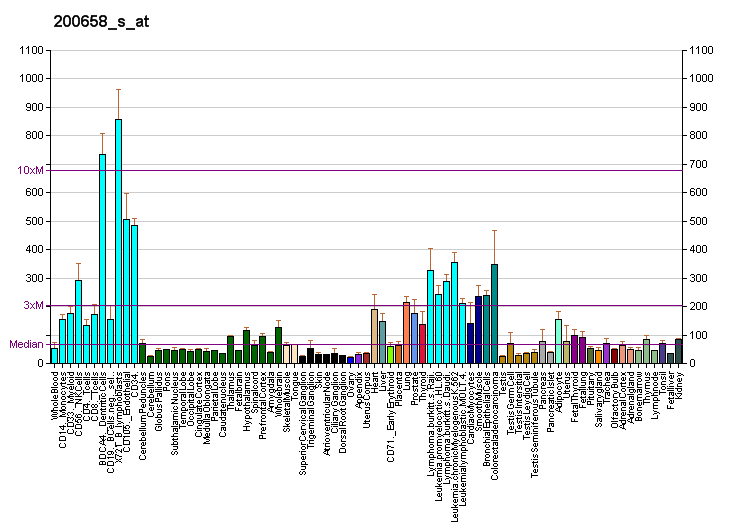
RNA expression pattern
Bgee	Human / Mouse (ortholog); Top expressed in: mucosa of transverse colon; rectum; islet of Langerhans; right auricle of heart; apex of heart; minor salivary glands; muscle of thigh; right adrenal gland; left ventricle; left adrenal gland / Top expressed in: yolk sac; right kidney; muscle of thigh; embryo; embryo; dentate gyrus of hippocampal formation granule cell; neural layer of retina; proximal tubule; ventricular zone; internal carotid artery; More reference expression data
BioGPS	More reference expression data
Gene ontology
Molecular function	histone deacetylase binding; complement component C3a binding; protein C-terminus binding; proteinase activated receptor binding; complement component C3b binding; protein binding; enzyme binding; DNA-binding transcription factor activity, RNA polymerase II-specific
Cellular component	cytoplasm; membrane; myelin sheath; plasma membrane; integral component of plasma membrane; nucleoplasm; cell surface; early endosome; mitochondrion; mitochondrial inner membrane; extracellular exosome; nucleus; postsynaptic density; mitochondrial crista; extrinsic component of mitochondrial outer membrane; extrinsic component of presynaptic active zone membrane; glutamatergic synapse; GABA-ergic synapse
Biological process	regulation of apoptotic process; negative regulation of glucocorticoid receptor signaling pathway; DNA biosynthetic process; regulation of transcription, DNA-templated; cellular response to interleukin-6; negative regulation of protein catabolic process; negative regulation of transcription by competitive promoter binding; protein stabilization; negative regulation of androgen receptor signaling pathway; mitochondrion organization; negative regulation of transcription by RNA polymerase II; positive regulation of transcription, DNA-templated; positive regulation of G protein-coupled receptor signaling pathway; negative regulation of cell growth; osteoblast differentiation; positive regulation of ERK1 and ERK2 cascade; positive regulation of complement activation; negative regulation of ERK1 and ERK2 cascade; progesterone receptor signaling pathway; negative regulation of transcription, DNA-templated; histone deacetylation; signal transduction; negative regulation of cell population proliferation; positive regulation of gene expression; positive regulation of cell death; mitochondrial calcium ion transmembrane transport; ovarian follicle development; ovarian follicle atresia; animal organ regeneration; response to cytokine; response to immobilization stress; negative regulation of apoptotic process; response to peptide hormone; response to ethanol
Sources:Amigo / QuickGO
Orthologs
Databases	NCBI: entry; OMA: entry
Species	Human	Mouse
Entrez	5245	18673
Ensembl	ENSG00000167085	ENSMUSG00000038845
UniProt	P35232	P67778
RefSeq (mRNA)	NM_002634; NM_001281496; NM_001281497; NM_001281715	NM_008831
RefSeq (protein)	NP_001268425; NP_001268426; NP_001268644; NP_002625	NP_032857
Location (UCSC)	Chr 17: 49.4 – 49.41 Mb	Chr 11: 95.56 – 95.57 Mb
PubMed search
- Wikidata
View/Edit Human	View/Edit Mouse

Prohibitin, also known as PHB, is a protein that in humans is encoded by the PHB gene. The Phb gene has also been described in animals, fungi, plants, and unicellular eukaryotes. Prohibitins are divided in two classes, termed Type-I and Type-II prohibitins, based on their similarity to yeast PHB1 and PHB2, respectively. Each organism has at least one copy of each type of prohibitin gene.

== Discovery ==
Prohibitins are evolutionarily conserved genes that are ubiquitously expressed. The human prohibitin gene, located on the BRCA1 chromosome region 17q21, was originally thought to be a negative regulator of cell proliferation and a tumor suppressor. This anti-proliferative activity was later attributed to the 3' untranslated region of the PHB gene, and not to the actual protein. Mutations in human PHB have been linked to sporadic breast cancer. However, over-expression of PHB has been associated with a reduction in androgen receptor activity and a reduction in PSA gene expression resulting in a decrease of androgen-dependent growth of prostate cancer cells. Prohibitin is expressed as two transcripts with varying lengths of 3' untranslated region. The longer transcript is present at higher levels in proliferating tissues and cells, suggesting that this longer 3' untranslated region may function as a trans-acting regulatory RNA.

== Function ==
Prohibitins may have multiple functions including:

=== Mitochondrial function and morphology ===
Prohibitins are assembled into a ring-like structure with 16–20 alternating Phb1 and Phb2 subunits in the inner mitochondrial membrane. The precise molecular function of the PHB complex is not clear, but a role as chaperone for respiratory chain proteins or as a general structuring scaffold required for optimal mitochondrial morphology and function are suspected. Recently, prohibitins have been demonstrated to be positive, rather than negative, regulators of cell proliferation in both plants and mice.

=== Transcriptional modulation ===
Both human prohibitins have also been suggested to be localized in the cell nucleus and modulate transcriptional activity by interacting with various transcription factors, including nuclear receptors, either directly or indirectly. However, little evidence for nuclear targeting and transcription factor-binding of prohibitins has been found in other organism (yeast, plants, C. elegans, etc.), indicating that this may be a specific function in mammalian cells.

== Clinical significance ==
Human prohibitin 1 has some activity as a virus receptor protein, having been identified as a receptor for Chikungunya Virus (CHIKV) and Dengue Virus 2 (DENV-2). Little else is known about the activity of the prohibitins in viral pathogenesis.

== Interactions ==
Prohibitin has been shown to interact with:

- ANXA2
- C-Raf,
- E2F1,
- HDAC1,
- P53,
- RB1,
- RBL1,
- RBL2,
- SMARCA2, and
- SMARCA4.

== Drugs that bind to prohibitin ==
- Aurilide
- Fluorizoline
- Rocaglamide A

Prohibitinn in insect Prohibitin (PHB) is a highly conserved eukaryotic protein complex involved in multiple cellular processes. In insects, PHB has been identified as a potential target protein to insecticidal molecules acting as a receptor of PF2 insecticidal lectin in the midgut of Zabrotes subfasciatus larvae (bean pest) and Cry protein of Bacillus thuringiensis in Leptinotarsa decemlineata (Colorado potato beetle).
