= E2F =

Family of transcription factors

E2F is a group of genes that encodes a family of transcription factors (TF) in higher eukaryotes. Three of them are activators: E2F1, 2 and E2F3a. Six others act as repressors: E2F3b, E2F4-8. All of them are involved in the cell cycle regulation and synthesis of DNA in mammalian cells. E2Fs as TFs bind to the TTTCCCGC (or slight variations of this sequence) consensus binding site in the target promoter sequence. With the exception of E2F6, E2F7 and E2F8, most members possess a pocket protein–binding domain, whose best known binding partner is the retinoblastoma protein (pRb), and a transactivation domain.

== E2F family ==
Schematic diagram of the amino acid sequences of E2F family members (N-terminus to the left, C-terminus to the right) highlighting the relative locations of functional domains within each member:

| Family members | Legend |
|---|---|
| | cyc A - Cyclin A binding domain; DNA - DNA-binding domain; DP1,2 - domain for dimerization with DP1, 2; TA - transcriptional activation domain; PB - pocket protein binding domain |

== Genes ==
Humans E2F genes include:

- E2F1, E2F2, E2F3, E2F4
- E2F5, E2F6, E2F7, E2F8

== Structure ==
X-ray crystallographic analysis has shown that the E2F family of transcription factors has a fold similar to the winged-helix DNA-binding motif.

== Role in the cell cycle ==
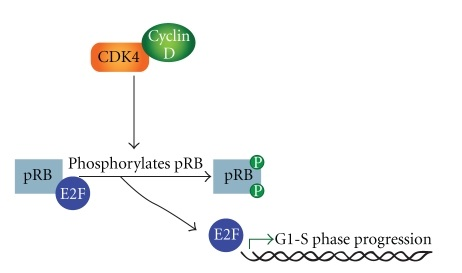
Role of CDK4, cyklin D, Rb and E2F in cell cycle regulation.

Overview of signal transduction pathways involved in apoptosis.

E2F family members play a major role during the G1/S transition in mammalian and plant cell cycle (see KEGG cell cycle pathway). DNA microarray analysis reveals unique sets of target promoters among E2F family members suggesting that each protein has a unique role in the cell cycle. Among E2F transcriptional targets are cyclins, CDKs, checkpoints regulators, DNA repair and replication proteins. Nonetheless, there is a great deal of redundancy among the family members. Mouse embryos lacking E2F1, E2F2, and one of the E2F3 isoforms, can develop normally when either E2F3a or E2F3b, is expressed.

The E2F family is generally split by function into two groups: transcription activators and repressors. Activators such as E2F1, E2F2, E2F3a promote and help carryout the cell cycle, while repressors inhibit the cell cycle. Yet, both sets of E2F have similar domains. E2F1-6 have DP1,2 heterodimerization domain which allows them to bind to DP1 or DP2, proteins distantly related to E2F. Binding with DP1,2 provides a second DNA binding site, increasing E2F binding stability. Most E2F have a pocket protein binding domain. Pocket proteins such as pRB and related proteins p107 and p130, can bind to E2F when hypophosphorylated. In activators, E2F binding with pRB has been shown to mask the transactivation domain responsible for transcription activation. In repressors E2F4 and E2F5, pocket protein binding (more often p107 and p130 than pRB) mediates recruitment of repression complexes to silence target genes. E2F6, E2F7, and E2F8 do not have pocket protein binding sites and their mechanism for gene silencing is unclear. Cdk4(6)/cyclin D and cdk2/cyclin E phosphorylate pRB and related pocket proteins allowing them to disassociate from E2F. Activator E2F proteins can then transcribe S phase promoting genes. In REF52 cells, overexpression of activator E2F1 is able to push quiescent cells into S phase. While repressors E2F4 and 5 do not alter cell proliferation, they mediate G1 arrest.

E2F activator levels are cyclic, with maximal expression during G1/S. In contrast, E2F repressors stay constant, especially since they are often expressed in quiescent cells. Specifically, E2F5 is only expressed in terminally differentiated cells in mice. The balance between repressor and activator E2F regulate cell cycle progression. When activator E2F family proteins are knocked out, repressors become active to inhibit E2F target genes.

== E2F/pRb complexes ==
The Rb tumor suppressor protein (pRb) binds to the E2F1 transcription factor preventing it from interacting with the cell's transcription machinery. In the absence of pRb, E2F1 (along with its binding partner DP1) mediates the trans-activation of E2F1 target genes that facilitate the G1/S transition and S-phase. E2F targets genes that encode proteins involved in DNA replication (for example DNA polymerase, thymidine kinase, dihydrofolate reductase and cdc6), and chromosomal replication (replication origin-binding protein HsOrc1 and MCM5). When cells are not proliferating, E2F DNA binding sites contribute to transcriptional repression. In vivo footprinting experiments obtained on Cdc2 and B-myb promoters demonstrated E2F DNA binding site occupation during G0 and early G1, when E2F is in transcriptional repressive complexes with the pocket proteins.

pRb is one of the targets of the oncogenic human papilloma virus protein E7, and human adenovirus protein E1A. By binding to pRB, they stop the regulation of E2F transcription factors and drive the cell cycle to enable virus genome replication.

=== Activators: E2F1, E2F2, E2F3a ===
Activators are maximally expressed late in G1 and can be found in association with E2F regulated promoters during the G1/S transition. The activation of E2F-3a genes follows upon the growth factor stimulation and the subsequent phosphorylation of the E2F inhibitor retinoblastoma protein, pRB. The phosphorylation of pRB is initiated by cyclin D/cdk4, cdk6 complex and continued by cyclin E/cdk2. Cyclin D/cdk4,6 itself is activated by the MAPK signaling pathway.

When bound to E2F-3a, pRb can directly repress E2F-3a target genes by recruiting chromatin remodeling complexes and histone modifying activities (e.g. histone deacetylase, HDAC) to the promoter.

=== Inhibitors: E2F3b, E2F4, E2F5, E2F6, E2F7, E2F8 ===
- E2F3b, E2F4, E2F5 are expressed in quiescent cells and can be found associated with E2F-binding elements on E2F-target promoters during G0-phase. E2F-4 and 5 preferentially bind to p107/p130.
- E2F-6 acts as a transcriptional repressor, but through a distinct, pocket protein independent manner. E2F-6 mediates repression by direct binding to polycomb-group proteins or via the formation of a large multimeric complex containing Mga and Max proteins.
- The repressor genes E2F7/E2F8, located on chromosome 7, are transcription factors responsible for protein coding cell cycle regulation. Together, they are essential for the development of an intact, organized, and functional placental structure during embryonic development. While the specific molecular pathways remain unknown, researchers have used placental and fetal lineage specific cre mice to determine the functions of the synergistic E2F7 and E2Fhe8 genes. Knockout mice, deplete of E2F7 and E2F8, result in abnormal trophoblastic proliferation accompanied by advanced cellular apoptosis. Phenotypically, the placenta presents with disruptions in cellular architecture to include large clusters of undifferentiated trophoblastic cells, which have failed to invade the maternal decidua. E2F7 and E2F8 proteins can function as repressors independently of DP interaction. They are unique in having a duplicated conserved E2F-like DNA-binding domain and in lacking a DP1,2-dimerization domain. They also appear to play a role in angiogenesis through the activation of vascular endothelial growth factor A. Using zebrafish, severe vascular defects of the head and somatic vessels were discovered when animals were depleted of E2F7 and E2F8. Antagonized by E2F3a, a transcriptional program has been discovered that functions through the coordination of multiple genes in the E2F family in order to ensure proper development of the placenta.

== Transcriptional targets ==
- Cell cycle: CCNA1,2, CCND1,2, CDK2, MYB, E2F1,2,3, TFDP1, CDC25A
- Negative regulators: E2F7, RB1, TP107, TP21
- Checkpoints: TP53, BRCA1,2, BUB1
- Apoptosis: TP73, APAF1, CASP3,7,8, MAP3K5,14
- Nucleotide synthesis: thymidine kinase (tk), thymidylate synthase (ts), DHFR
- DNA repair: BARD1, RAD51, UNG1,2, FANCA, FANCC, FANCJ
- DNA replication: PCNA, histone H2A, DNA pol$\alpha$ and $\delta$, RPA1,2,3, CDC6, MCM2,3,4,5,6,7

== See also ==
- Transcription factor DP
- Type 3c (Pancreatogenic) Diabetes
