= Sp2 transcription factor =

Protein-coding gene in the species Homo sapiens

SP2

Identifiers
- Aliases: SP2, Sp2, 4930480I16Rik, mKIAA0048, Sp2 transcription factor
- External IDs: OMIM: 601801; MGI: 1926162; GeneCards: SP2

Gene location (Human)
Chr.	Chromosome 17 (human)
Band	17q21.32	Start	47,896,150 bp
Band	17q21.32	End	47,928,957 bp

Gene location (Mouse)
Chr.	Chromosome 11 (mouse)
Band	11|11 D	Start	96,844,167 bp
Band	11|11 D	End	96,873,785 bp
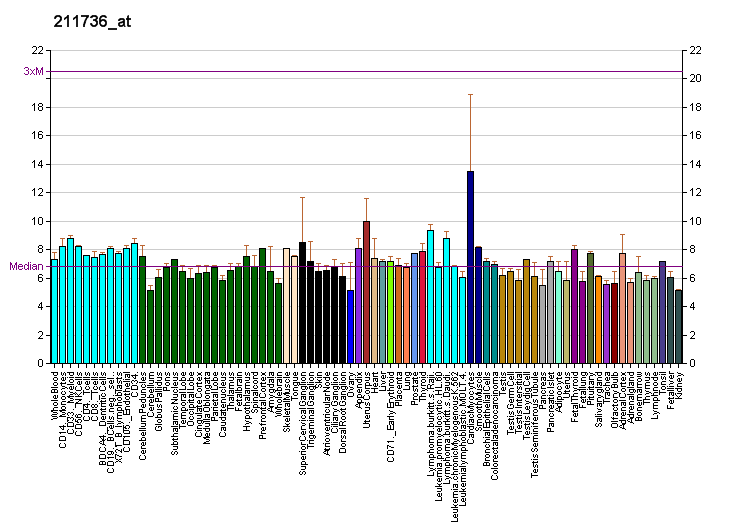

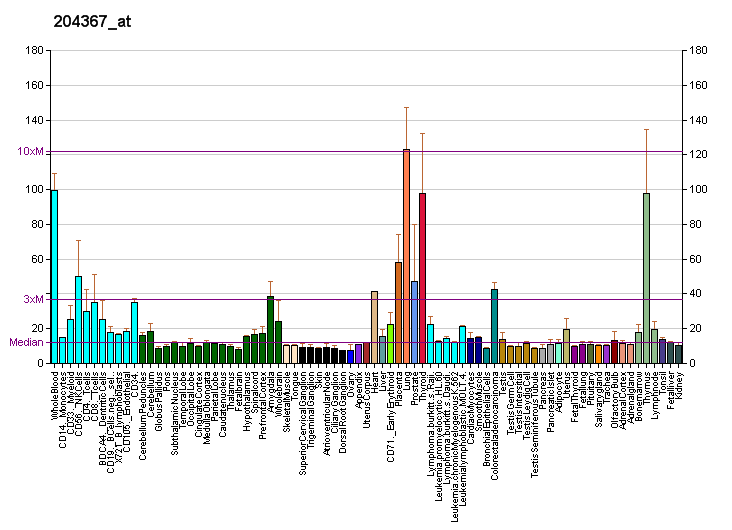
RNA expression pattern
Bgee	Human / Mouse (ortholog); Top expressed in: secondary oocyte; buccal mucosa cell; granulocyte; right testis; left testis; gastrocnemius muscle; popliteal artery; muscle of thigh; tibial arteries; monocyte / Top expressed in: granulocyte; tail of embryo; genital tubercle; yolk sac; zygote; muscle of thigh; thymus; neural layer of retina; mesenteric lymph nodes; epiblast; More reference expression data
BioGPS	More reference expression data
Gene ontology
Molecular function	DNA binding; histone deacetylase binding; protein binding; metal ion binding; nucleic acid binding; RNA polymerase II cis-regulatory region sequence-specific DNA binding; DNA-binding transcription repressor activity, RNA polymerase II-specific; DNA-binding transcription factor activity, RNA polymerase II-specific
Cellular component	nucleus
Biological process	regulation of transcription by RNA polymerase II; regulation of transcription, DNA-templated; immune response; transcription, DNA-templated; multicellular organism growth; negative regulation of transcription by RNA polymerase II
Sources:Amigo / QuickGO
Orthologs
Databases	NCBI: entry; OMA: entry
Species	Human	Mouse
Entrez	6668	78912
Ensembl	ENSG00000167182	ENSMUSG00000018678
UniProt	Q02086; Q9BRW5	Q9D2H6
RefSeq (mRNA)	NM_003110	NM_001080964; NM_030220; NM_001363225; NM_001363226
RefSeq (protein)	NP_003101	NP_001074433; NP_084496; NP_001350154; NP_001350155
Location (UCSC)	Chr 17: 47.9 – 47.93 Mb	Chr 11: 96.84 – 96.87 Mb
PubMed search
- Wikidata
View/Edit Human	View/Edit Mouse

Transcription factor Sp2 is a protein that in humans is encoded by the SP2 gene.

== Function ==
This gene encodes a member of the Sp subfamily of Sp/XKLF transcription factors. Sp family proteins are sequence-specific DNA-binding proteins characterized by an amino-terminal trans-activation domain and three carboxy-terminal zinc finger motifs. This protein contains the least conserved DNA-binding domain within the Sp subfamily of proteins, and its DNA sequence specificity differs from the other Sp proteins. It localizes primarily within subnuclear foci associated with the nuclear matrix, and can activate or in some cases repress expression from different promoters.

== Interactions ==
Sp2 transcription factor has been shown to interact with E2F1.
