= BEGAIN =

Protein-coding gene in the species Homo sapiens

Identifiers
- Aliases: BEGAIN, brain enriched guanylate kinase associated
- External IDs: MGI: 3044626; HomoloGene: 10829; GeneCards: BEGAIN; OMA:BEGAIN - orthologs

Gene location (Human)
Chr.	Chromosome 14 (human)
Band	14q32.2	Start	100,537,147 bp
Band	14q32.2	End	100,587,413 bp

Gene location (Mouse)
Chr.	Chromosome 12 (mouse)
Band	12|12 F1	Start	108,998,113 bp
Band	12|12 F1	End	109,034,143 bp
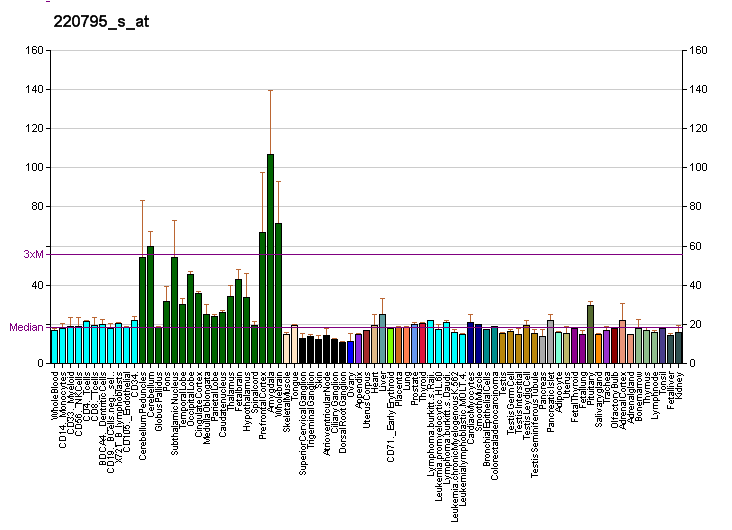
RNA expression pattern
Bgee	Human / Mouse (ortholog); Top expressed in: right hemisphere of cerebellum; right frontal lobe; anterior cingulate cortex; body of pancreas; Brodmann area 9; amygdala; anterior pituitary; hippocampus proper; nucleus accumbens; orbitofrontal cortex / Top expressed in: hypothalamus; striatum of neuraxis; superior frontal gyrus; primary visual cortex; hippocampus proper; olfactory bulb; cerebellar cortex; dentate gyrus of hippocampal formation granule cell; layer of retina; neural layer of retina; More reference expression data
BioGPS	More reference expression data
Orthologs
Species	Human	Mouse
Entrez	57596	380785
Ensembl	ENSG00000183092	ENSMUSG00000040867
UniProt	Q9BUH8	Q68EF6
RefSeq (mRNA)	NM_001159531; NM_020836	NM_001163175; NM_001374200; NM_001374201; NM_001374202; NM_001374203
RefSeq (protein)	NP_001153003; NP_065887	NP_001156647
Location (UCSC)	Chr 14: 100.54 – 100.59 Mb	Chr 12: 109 – 109.03 Mb
PubMed search
- Wikidata
View/Edit Human	View/Edit Mouse

Brain-enriched guanylate kinase-associated protein is an enzyme that in humans is encoded by the BEGAIN gene.

== Interactions ==
BEGAIN has been shown to interact with Retinoblastoma-like protein 1.
