= Retinoblastoma-like protein 1 =

Mammalian protein found in Homo sapiens

RBL1

Identifiers
- Aliases: RBL1, CP107, PRB1, p107, retinoblastoma-like 1, RB transcriptional corepressor like 1
- External IDs: OMIM: 116957; MGI: 103300; GeneCards: RBL1
Available structures
| PDB | Ortholog search: PDBe RCSB |
| PDB | List of PDB id codes 1H28, 4YOO, 4YOS, 4YOZ |

Gene location (Human)
| Chr. | Chromosome 20 (human) |
| Band | 20q11.23 | Start | 36,996,349 bp |
| Band | 20q11.23 | End | 37,095,997 bp |

Gene location (Mouse)
| Chr. | Chromosome 2 (mouse) |
| Band | 2 H1|2 78.05 cM | Start | 156,987,813 bp |
| Band | 2 H1|2 78.05 cM | End | 157,046,454 bp |
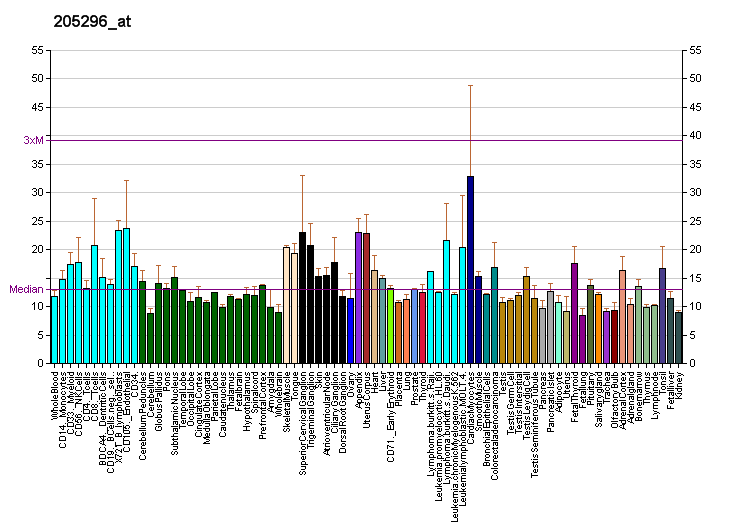
RNA expression pattern
| Bgee | Human / Mouse (ortholog); Top expressed in: buccal mucosa cell; Achilles tendon; ventricular zone; testicle; ganglionic eminence; Skeletal muscle tissue of rectus abdominis; bone marrow cell; gonad; muscle of thigh; epithelium of nasopharynx / Top expressed in: Paneth cell; hair follicle; medial ganglionic eminence; dermis; spermatocyte; vas deferens; precursor cell; migratory enteric neural crest cell; fetal liver hematopoietic progenitor cell; renal corpuscle; More reference expression data |
| BioGPS | More reference expression data |
Gene ontology
| Molecular function | transcription factor binding; protein binding; promoter-specific chromatin binding; DNA-binding transcription repressor activity, RNA polymerase II-specific |
| Cellular component | nucleus; transcription regulator complex; nucleoplasm; chromatin |
| Biological process | regulation of cell cycle; regulation of transcription by RNA polymerase II; cell cycle; viral process; regulation of transcription, DNA-templated; negative regulation of transcription by RNA polymerase II; positive regulation of transcription by RNA polymerase II; regulation of lipid kinase activity; negative regulation of gene expression; transcription, DNA-templated; negative regulation of cellular senescence; chromatin organization; regulation of mitotic cell cycle; cell differentiation; regulation of cell division; negative regulation of G1/S transition of mitotic cell cycle |
Sources:Amigo / QuickGO
Orthologs
| Databases | NCBI: entry; OMA: entry |
| Species | Human | Mouse |
| Entrez | 5933 | 19650 |
| Ensembl | ENSG00000080839 | ENSMUSG00000027641 |
| UniProt | P28749 | Q64701 |
| RefSeq (mRNA) | NM_002895; NM_183404; NM_001323281; NM_001323282 | NM_001139516; NM_011249 |
| RefSeq (protein) | NP_001310210; NP_001310211; NP_002886; NP_899662 | NP_001132988; NP_035379 |
| Location (UCSC) | Chr 20: 37 – 37.1 Mb | Chr 2: 156.99 – 157.05 Mb |
| PubMed search |
- Wikidata
| View/Edit Human | View/Edit Mouse |

Retinoblastoma-like 1 (p107), also known as RBL1, is a protein that in humans is encoded by the RBL1 gene.

== Function ==
The protein encoded by this gene is similar in sequence and possibly function to the product of the retinoblastoma 1 (RB1) gene. The RB1 gene product is a tumor suppressor protein that appears to be involved in cell cycle regulation, as it is phosphorylated in the S to M phase transition and is dephosphorylated in the G1 phase of the cell cycle. Both the RB1 protein and the product of this gene can form a complex with adenovirus E1A protein and SV40 Large T-antigen, with the SV40 large T-antigen binding only to the unphosphorylated form of each protein. In addition, both proteins can inhibit the transcription of cell cycle genes containing E2F binding sites in their promoters. Due to the sequence and biochemical similarities with the RB1 protein, it is thought that the protein encoded by this gene may also be a tumor suppressor. Two transcript variants encoding different isoforms have been found for this gene.

== Interactions ==
Retinoblastoma-like protein 1 has been shown to interact with:

- BEGAIN,
- BRCA1,
- BRF1,
- Cyclin A2,
- Cyclin-dependent kinase 2,
- E2F1,
- HDAC1,
- MYBL2
- Mothers against decapentaplegic homolog 3,
- Prohibitin, and
- RBBP8.

== See also ==
- Pocket protein family
