= Pocket protein family =

Protein family

Pocket protein family consists of three proteins:

- RB – Retinoblastoma protein
- p107 – Retinoblastoma-like protein 1
- p130 – Retinoblastoma-like protein 2

They play crucial roles in the metazoan cell cycle through interaction with members of the E2F transcription factors family.
