= E2F7 =

Protein-coding gene in humans

Identifiers
- Aliases: E2F7, E2F transcription factor 7
- External IDs: OMIM: 612046; MGI: 1289147; GeneCards: E2F7

Gene location (Human)
Chr.	Chromosome 12 (human)
Band	12q21.2	Start	77,021,248 bp
Band	12q21.2	End	77,065,569 bp

Gene location (Mouse)
Chr.	Chromosome 10 (mouse)
Band	10 D1|10 57.74 cM	Start	110,581,300 bp
Band	10 D1|10 57.74 cM	End	110,623,245 bp
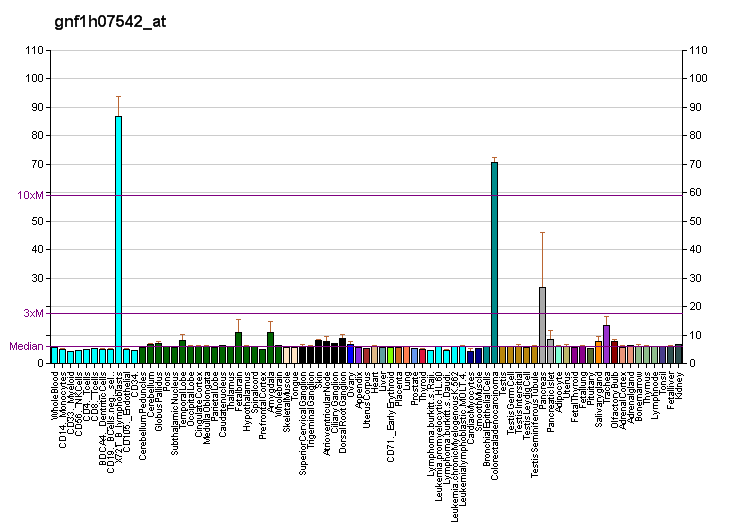
RNA expression pattern
Bgee	Human / Mouse (ortholog); Top expressed in: ventricular zone; thymus; gonad; ganglionic eminence; testicle; secondary oocyte; stromal cell of endometrium; mucosa of ileum; bone marrow cell; pancreatic ductal cell / Top expressed in: otic vesicle; hand; primitive streak; fossa; tail of embryo; condyle; yolk sac; genital tubercle; abdominal wall; mandibular prominence; More reference expression data
BioGPS	More reference expression data
Gene ontology
Molecular function	DNA binding; RNA polymerase II transcription regulatory region sequence-specific DNA binding; transcription corepressor activity; protein binding; DNA-binding transcription repressor activity, RNA polymerase II-specific; identical protein binding; DNA-binding transcription factor activity; DNA-binding transcription factor activity, RNA polymerase II-specific; RNA polymerase II cis-regulatory region sequence-specific DNA binding; cis-regulatory region sequence-specific DNA binding; DNA-binding transcription activator activity, RNA polymerase II-specific; transcription factor binding; sequence-specific DNA binding
Cellular component	transcription regulator complex; nucleus; nucleoplasm; nuclear speck; RNA polymerase II transcription regulator complex
Biological process	trophoblast giant cell differentiation; regulation of transcription, DNA-templated; chorionic trophoblast cell differentiation; negative regulation of transcription involved in G1/S transition of mitotic cell cycle; placenta development; DNA damage response, signal transduction by p53 class mediator; hepatocyte differentiation; negative regulation of transcription by RNA polymerase II; transcription, DNA-templated; cellular response to DNA damage stimulus; negative regulation of G1/S transition of mitotic cell cycle; cell cycle; negative regulation of cytokinesis; positive regulation of DNA endoreduplication; positive regulation of transcription by RNA polymerase II; sprouting angiogenesis; DNA damage response, signal transduction by p53 class mediator resulting in cell cycle arrest; negative regulation of cell population proliferation; regulation of cell cycle
Sources:Amigo / QuickGO
Orthologs
Databases	NCBI: entry; OMA: entry
Species	Human	Mouse
Entrez	144455	52679
Ensembl	ENSG00000165891	ENSMUSG00000020185
UniProt	Q96AV8	Q6S7F2
RefSeq (mRNA)	NM_203394	NM_178609; NM_001358560
RefSeq (protein)	NP_976328	NP_848724; NP_001345489
Location (UCSC)	Chr 12: 77.02 – 77.07 Mb	Chr 10: 110.58 – 110.62 Mb
PubMed search
- Wikidata
View/Edit Human	View/Edit Mouse

Transcription factor E2F7 is a protein that in humans is encoded by the E2F7 gene.
