= E2F5 =

Protein-coding gene in humans

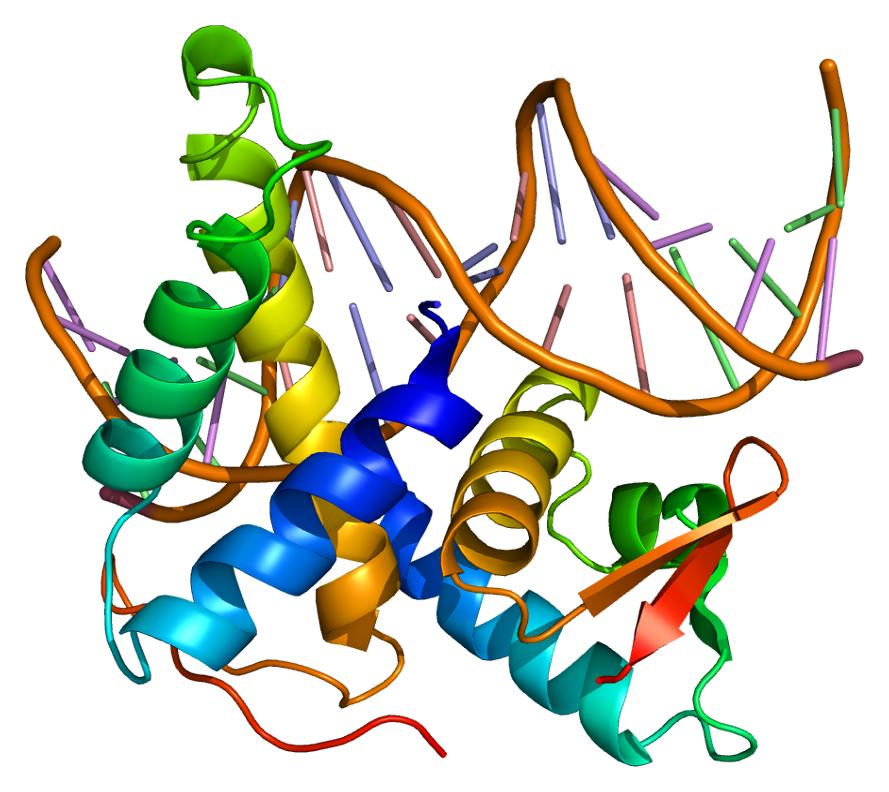

Identifiers
- Aliases: E2F5, E2F-5, E2F transcription factor 5
- External IDs: OMIM: 600967; MGI: 105091; GeneCards: E2F5

Gene location (Human)
Chr.	Chromosome 8 (human)
Band	8q21.2	Start	85,177,154 bp
Band	8q21.2	End	85,217,158 bp

Gene location (Mouse)
Chr.	Chromosome 3 (mouse)
Band	3|3 A1	Start	14,643,701 bp
Band	3|3 A1	End	14,671,369 bp
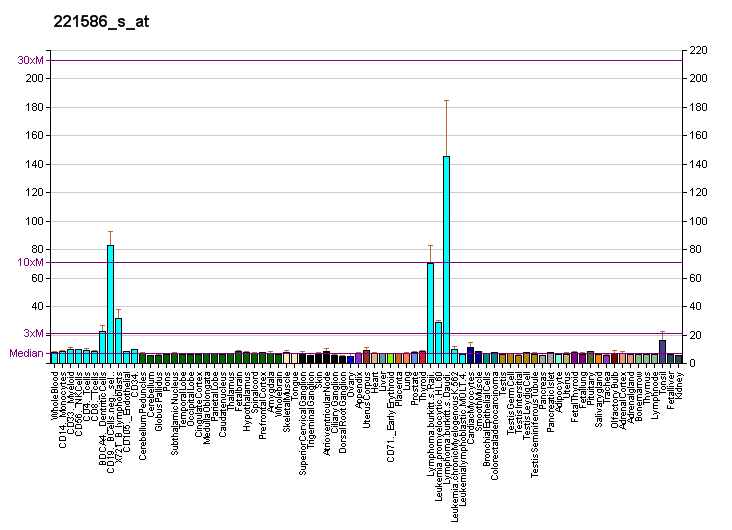
RNA expression pattern
Bgee	Human / Mouse (ortholog); Top expressed in: ventricular zone; ganglionic eminence; lymph node; islet of Langerhans; testicle; rectum; appendix; granulocyte; tibial nerve; right uterine tube / Top expressed in: zygote; secondary oocyte; primary oocyte; somite; epiblast; abdominal wall; primitive streak; medial ganglionic eminence; tail of embryo; submandibular gland; More reference expression data
BioGPS	More reference expression data
Gene ontology
Molecular function	DNA-binding transcription factor activity; DNA binding; transcription factor binding; protein binding; protein dimerization activity; DNA-binding transcription factor activity, RNA polymerase II-specific; DNA-binding transcription activator activity, RNA polymerase II-specific; DNA-binding transcription repressor activity, RNA polymerase II-specific; sequence-specific DNA binding
Cellular component	cytoplasm; nucleolus; nucleus; transcription regulator complex; nucleoplasm; fibrillar center; RNA polymerase II transcription regulator complex
Biological process	animal organ morphogenesis; regulation of cell cycle; cell projection organization; regulation of transcription, DNA-templated; positive regulation of transcription by RNA polymerase II; transcription, DNA-templated; negative regulation of transcription by RNA polymerase II
Sources:Amigo / QuickGO
Orthologs
Databases	NCBI: entry; OMA: entry
Species	Human	Mouse
Entrez	1875	13559
Ensembl	ENSG00000133740	ENSMUSG00000027552
UniProt	Q15329	Q61502
RefSeq (mRNA)	NM_001083588; NM_001083589; NM_001951	NM_007892
RefSeq (protein)	NP_001077057; NP_001077058; NP_001942	NP_031918
Location (UCSC)	Chr 8: 85.18 – 85.22 Mb	Chr 3: 14.64 – 14.67 Mb
PubMed search
- Wikidata
View/Edit Human	View/Edit Mouse

Transcription factor E2F5 is a protein that in humans is encoded by the E2F5 gene.

== Function ==
The protein encoded by this gene is a member of the E2F family of transcription factors. The E2F family plays a crucial role in the control of cell cycle and action of tumor suppressor proteins and is also a target of the transforming proteins of small DNA tumor viruses. The E2F proteins contain several evolutionarily conserved domains that are present in most members of the family. These domains include a DNA binding domain, a dimerization domain which determines interaction with the differentiation regulated transcription factor proteins (DP), a transactivation domain enriched in acidic amino acids, and a tumor suppressor protein association domain which is embedded within the transactivation domain. This protein is differentially phosphorylated and is expressed in a wide variety of human tissues. It has higher identity to E2F4 than to other family members. Both this protein and E2F4 interact with tumor suppressor proteins p130 and p107, but not with pRB. Alternative splicing results in multiple variants encoding different isoforms.

== Interactions ==
E2F5 has been shown to interact with TFDP1.

== See also ==
- E2F
