= MDM4 =

Protein-coding gene in humans

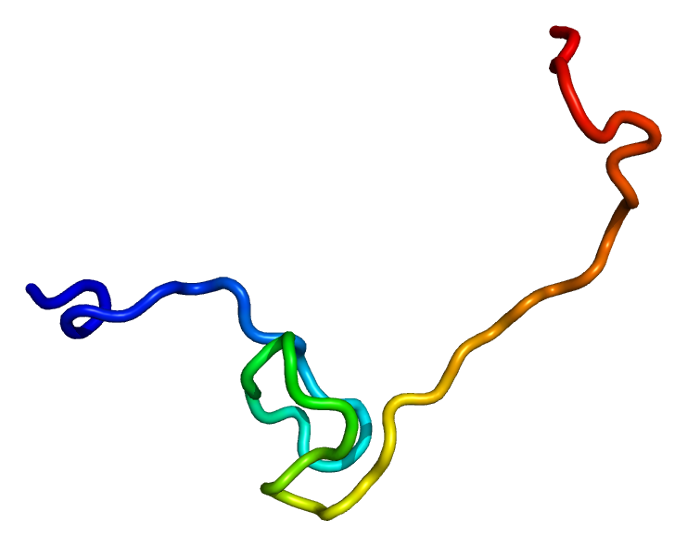

Identifiers
- Aliases: MDM4, HDMX, MDMX, MRP1, p53 regulator, MDM4 regulator of p53, BMFS6
- External IDs: OMIM: 602704; MGI: 107934; GeneCards: MDM4
Available structures
PDB	Ortholog search: PDBe RCSB
PDB	List of PDB id codes 2CR8, 2VJE, 2VJF, 2VYR, 3DAB, 3EQY, 3FDO, 3FE7, 3FEA, 3JZO, 3JZP, 3JZQ, 3LBJ, 3MQR, 3U15, 4RXZ, 2MWY, 2N06, 2N0W, 2N14, 2N0U

Gene location (Human)
Chr.	Chromosome 1 (human)
Band	1q32.1	Start	204,516,379 bp
Band	1q32.1	End	204,558,120 bp

Gene location (Mouse)
Chr.	Chromosome 1 (mouse)
Band	1 E4|1 57.75 cM	Start	132,887,222 bp
Band	1 E4|1 57.75 cM	End	132,958,299 bp
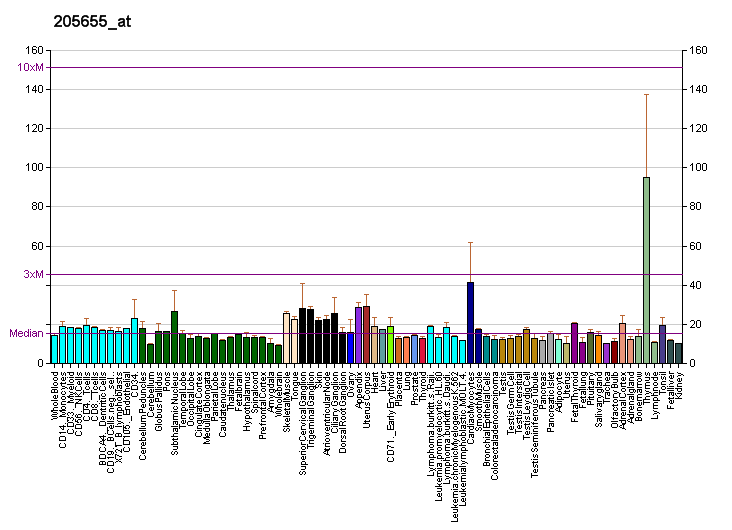
RNA expression pattern
Bgee	Human / Mouse (ortholog); Top expressed in: nipple; oocyte; epithelium of colon; trabecular bone; skin of thigh; pylorus; Achilles tendon; sural nerve; cardia; pericardium / Top expressed in: secondary oocyte; primary oocyte; zygote; genital tubercle; saccule; tail of embryo; granulocyte; neural layer of retina; otic placode; spermatocyte; More reference expression data
BioGPS	More reference expression data
Gene ontology
Molecular function	enzyme binding; protein binding; metal ion binding; ubiquitin protein ligase activity; zinc ion binding
Cellular component	nucleus; nucleoplasm
Biological process	G0 to G1 transition; DNA damage response, signal transduction by p53 class mediator; protein stabilization; cell population proliferation; negative regulation of apoptotic process; negative regulation of transcription by RNA polymerase II; cellular response to hypoxia; negative regulation of protein catabolic process; negative regulation of cell population proliferation; protein ubiquitination; DNA damage response, signal transduction by p53 class mediator resulting in cell cycle arrest; regulation of signal transduction by p53 class mediator; protein deubiquitination; protein-containing complex assembly; heart valve development; atrioventricular valve morphogenesis; endocardial cushion morphogenesis; ventricular septum development; atrial septum development
Sources:Amigo / QuickGO
Orthologs
Databases	NCBI: entry; OMA: entry
Species	Human	Mouse
Entrez	4194	17248
Ensembl	ENSG00000198625	ENSMUSG00000054387
UniProt	O15151; Q5T0Y2	O35618
RefSeq (mRNA)	NM_001204171; NM_001204172; NM_001278516; NM_001278517; NM_001278518 NM_001278519; NM_002393	NM_008575; NM_001302801; NM_001302802; NM_001302803; NM_001302804
RefSeq (protein)	NP_001191100; NP_001191101; NP_001265445; NP_001265446; NP_001265447 NP_001265448; NP_002384	NP_001289730; NP_001289731; NP_001289732; NP_001289733; NP_032601
Location (UCSC)	Chr 1: 204.52 – 204.56 Mb	Chr 1: 132.89 – 132.96 Mb
PubMed search
- Wikidata
View/Edit Human	View/Edit Mouse

Protein Mdm4 is a protein that in humans is encoded by the MDM4 gene.

== Function ==
The human MDM4 gene, which plays a role in apoptosis, encodes a 490-amino acid protein containing a RING finger domain and a putative nuclear localization signal. The MDM4 putative nuclear localization signal, which all Mdm proteins contain, is located in the C-terminal region of the protein. The mRNA is expressed at a high level in thymus and at lower levels in all other tissues tested. MDM4 protein produced by in vitro translation interacts with p53 via a binding domain located in the N-terminal region of the MDM4 protein. MDM4 shows significant structural similarity to p53-binding protein MDM2

== Interactions ==
MDM4 has been shown to interact with E2F1, Mdm2 and P53.
