= E2F4 =

Protein-coding gene in the species Homo sapiens

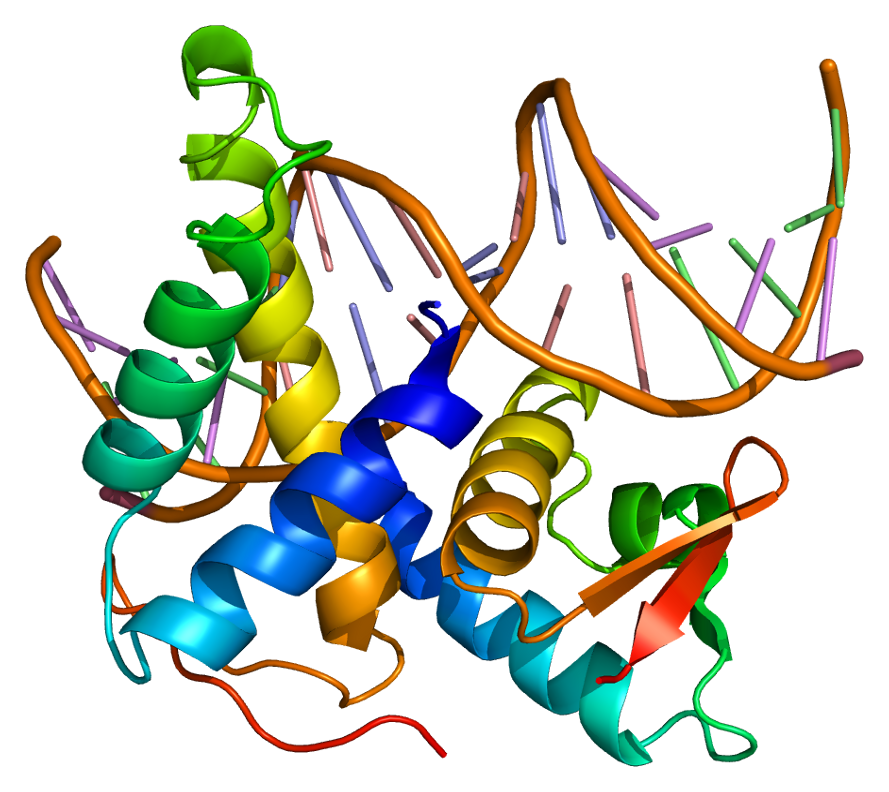

Identifiers
- Aliases: E2F4, E2F-4, E2F transcription factor 4
- External IDs: OMIM: 600659; MGI: 103012; GeneCards: E2F4
Available structures
PDB	Ortholog search: PDBe RCSB
PDB	List of PDB id codes 1CF7

Gene location (Human)
Chr.	Chromosome 16 (human)
Band	16q22.1	Start	67,192,155 bp
Band	16q22.1	End	67,198,918 bp

Gene location (Mouse)
Chr.	Chromosome 8 (mouse)
Band	8|8 D3	Start	106,024,295 bp
Band	8|8 D3	End	106,032,002 bp
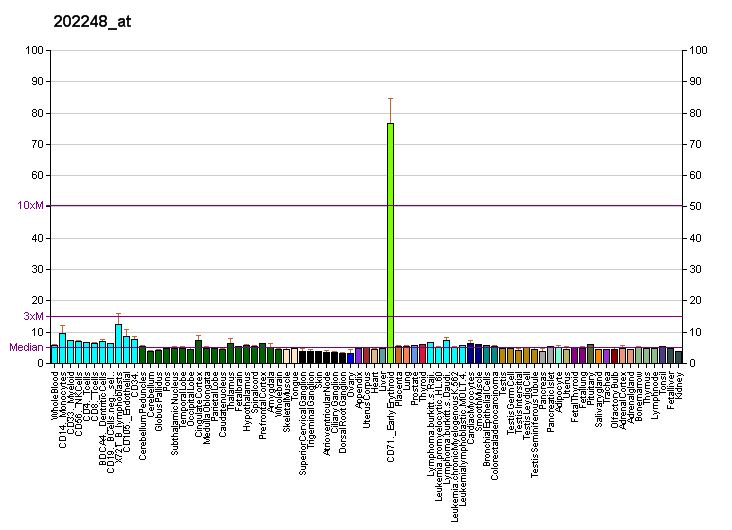

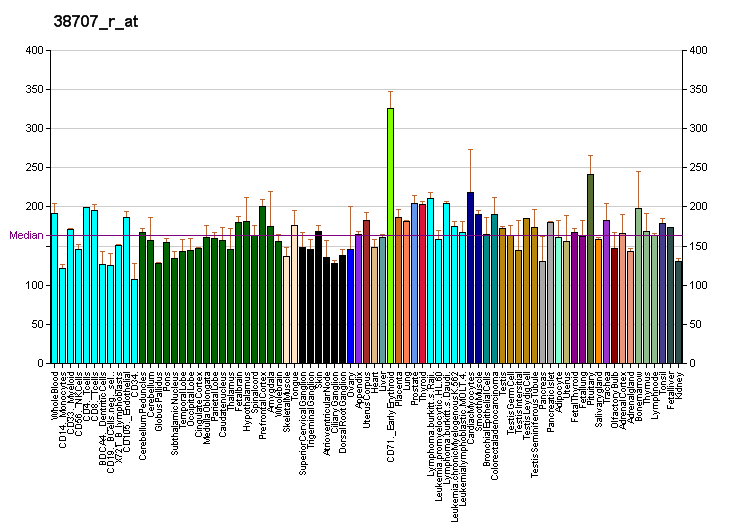
RNA expression pattern
Bgee	Human / Mouse (ortholog); Top expressed in: pancreatic ductal cell; granulocyte; left uterine tube; anterior pituitary; transverse colon; mucosa of transverse colon; apex of heart; body of stomach; right lobe of thyroid gland; upper lobe of left lung / Top expressed in: tail of embryo; zygote; yolk sac; genital tubercle; ventricular zone; embryo; neural layer of retina; lip; muscle of thigh; granulocyte; More reference expression data
BioGPS	More reference expression data
Gene ontology
Molecular function	DNA binding; protein domain specific binding; DNA-binding transcription factor activity; DNA-binding transcription activator activity, RNA polymerase II-specific; transcription factor binding; RNA polymerase II cis-regulatory region sequence-specific DNA binding; protein binding; promoter-specific chromatin binding; protein dimerization activity; DNA-binding transcription factor activity, RNA polymerase II-specific; DNA-binding transcription repressor activity, RNA polymerase II-specific; sequence-specific DNA binding
Cellular component	transcription regulator complex; nucleoplasm; nucleus; RNA polymerase II transcription regulator complex
Biological process	regulation of cell size; epithelial cell development; cell volume homeostasis; regulation of transcription, DNA-templated; multi-ciliated epithelial cell differentiation; transcription by RNA polymerase II; regulation of transcription involved in G1/S transition of mitotic cell cycle; blood circulation; cell projection organization; regulation of cell population proliferation; animal organ morphogenesis; cell cycle; motile cilium assembly; centriole assembly; transcription, DNA-templated; mitotic cell cycle; DNA damage response, signal transduction by p53 class mediator resulting in cell cycle arrest; positive regulation of transcription by RNA polymerase II; cilium assembly; negative regulation of transcription by RNA polymerase II; regulation of cell cycle
Sources:Amigo / QuickGO
Orthologs
Databases	NCBI: entry; OMA: entry
Species	Human	Mouse
Entrez	1874	104394
Ensembl	ENSG00000205250	ENSMUSG00000014859
UniProt	Q16254	Q8R0K9
RefSeq (mRNA)	NM_001950	NM_148952
RefSeq (protein)	NP_001941	NP_683754
Location (UCSC)	Chr 16: 67.19 – 67.2 Mb	Chr 8: 106.02 – 106.03 Mb
PubMed search
- Wikidata
View/Edit Human	View/Edit Mouse

Transcription factor E2F4 is a protein that in humans is encoded by the E2F4 gene.

== Function ==
The protein encoded by this gene is a member of the E2F family of transcription factors. The E2F family plays a crucial role in the control of cell cycle and action of tumor suppressor proteins and is also a target of the transforming proteins of small DNA tumor viruses. This protein binds to all three of the tumor suppressor proteins pRB, p107 and p130, but with higher affinity to the last two. It plays an important role in the suppression of proliferation-associated genes, and its gene mutation and increased expression may be associated with human cancer.

== Structure ==
The E2F proteins contain several evolutionally conserved domains found in most members of the family. These domains include a DNA binding domain, a dimerization domain which determines interaction with the differentiation regulated transcription factor proteins (DP), a transactivation domain enriched in acidic amino acids (Asp + Glu), and a tumor suppressor protein association domain which is embedded within the transactivation domain.

== Interactions ==
E2F4 has been shown to interact with Smad3.

== See also ==
- E2F
