= TFDP1 =

Protein-coding gene in humans

Identifiers
- Aliases: TFDP1, DP1, DRTF1, Dp-1, DILC, transcription factor Dp-1
- External IDs: OMIM: 189902; MGI: 101934; GeneCards: TFDP1
Available structures
PDB	Ortholog search: PDBe RCSB
PDB	List of PDB id codes 2AZE

Gene location (Human)
Chr.	Chromosome 13 (human)
Band	13q34	Start	113,584,721 bp
Band	13q34	End	113,641,473 bp

Gene location (Mouse)
Chr.	Chromosome 8 (mouse)
Band	8|8 A1.1	Start	13,338,751 bp
Band	8|8 A1.1	End	13,378,448 bp
RNA expression pattern
Bgee	Human / Mouse (ortholog); Top expressed in: secondary oocyte; trabecular bone; ventricular zone; bone marrow; stromal cell of endometrium; ganglionic eminence; rectum; olfactory zone of nasal mucosa; mucosa of esophagus; buccal mucosa cell / Top expressed in: granulocyte; epiblast; ventricular zone; dermis; tail of embryo; abdominal wall; fetal liver hematopoietic progenitor cell; hair follicle; genital tubercle; primitive streak; More reference expression data
BioGPS	n/a
Gene ontology
Molecular function	DNA binding; protein domain specific binding; DNA-binding transcription factor activity; protein binding; transcription coactivator activity; transcription factor binding; RNA polymerase II transcription regulatory region sequence-specific DNA binding; DNA-binding transcription activator activity, RNA polymerase II-specific; DNA-binding transcription factor activity, RNA polymerase II-specific
Cellular component	transcription regulator complex; nucleus; mitochondrion; nucleoplasm; cytosol; cytoplasm; RNA polymerase II transcription regulator complex
Biological process	regulation of transcription, DNA-templated; regulation of transcription by RNA polymerase II; positive regulation of protein insertion into mitochondrial membrane involved in apoptotic signaling pathway; cell cycle; cell population proliferation; DNA damage response, signal transduction by p53 class mediator resulting in cell cycle arrest; transcription, DNA-templated; regulation of transcription involved in G1/S transition of mitotic cell cycle; transcription by RNA polymerase II; negative regulation of G0 to G1 transition; positive regulation of transcription by RNA polymerase II; negative regulation of fat cell proliferation; epidermis development; anoikis; positive regulation of transcription, DNA-templated; regulation of cell cycle; regulation of DNA biosynthetic process
Sources:Amigo / QuickGO
Orthologs
Databases	NCBI: entry; OMA: entry
Species	Human	Mouse
Entrez	7027	21781
Ensembl	ENSG00000198176	ENSMUSG00000038482
UniProt	Q14186	Q08639
RefSeq (mRNA)	NM_007111	NM_001291765; NM_001291766; NM_001291768; NM_009361; NM_001358991
RefSeq (protein)	NP_009042	NP_001278694; NP_001278695; NP_001278697; NP_033387; NP_001345920
Location (UCSC)	Chr 13: 113.58 – 113.64 Mb	Chr 8: 13.34 – 13.38 Mb
PubMed search
- Wikidata
View/Edit Human	View/Edit Mouse

Transcription factor Dp-1 is a protein that in humans is encoded by the TFDP1 gene.

== Function ==
The E2F transcription factor family (see MIM 189971) regulates the expression of various cellular promoters, particularly those involved in the cell cycle. E2F factors bind to DNA as homodimers or heterodimers in association with dimerization partner DP1. TFDP1 may be the first example of a family of related transcription factors; see TFDP2 (MIM 602160).[supplied by OMIM]

== Interactions ==
TFDP1 has been shown to interact with:

- E2F1,
- E2F5, and
- P53.
