= TFDP2 =

Protein-coding gene in the species Homo sapiens

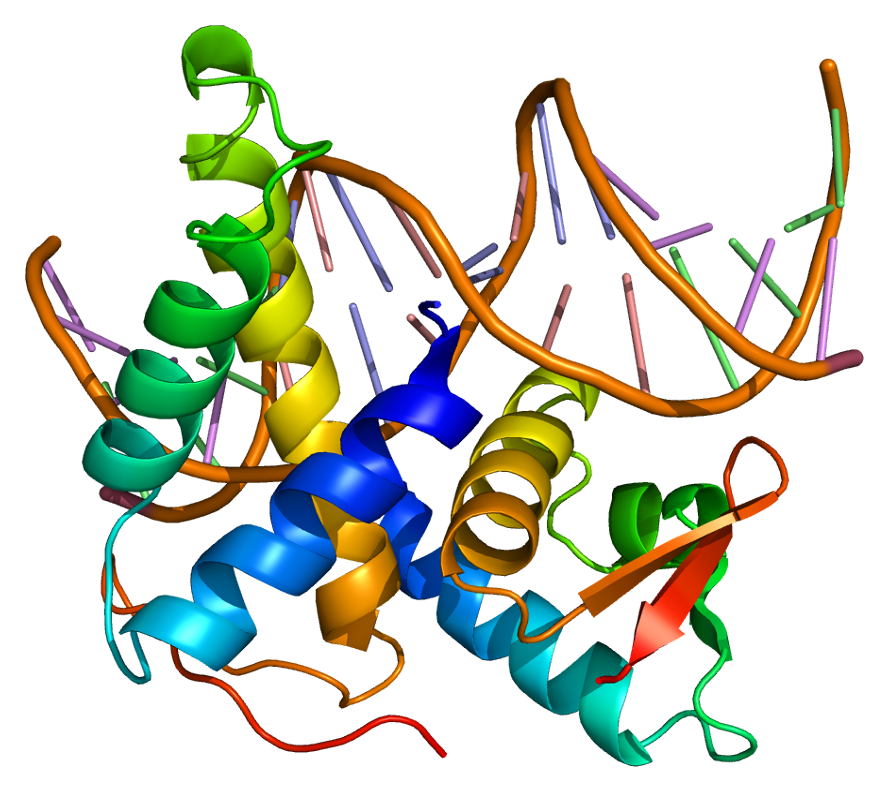

Identifiers
- Aliases: TFDP2, DP2, transcription factor Dp-2
- External IDs: OMIM: 602160; MGI: 107167; GeneCards: TFDP2
Available structures
PDB	Ortholog search: PDBe RCSB
PDB	List of PDB id codes 1CF7

Gene location (Human)
Chr.	Chromosome 3 (human)
Band	3q23	Start	141,944,428 bp
Band	3q23	End	142,149,544 bp

Gene location (Mouse)
Chr.	Chromosome 9 (mouse)
Band	9|9 E3.3	Start	96,196,275 bp
Band	9|9 E3.3	End	96,323,646 bp
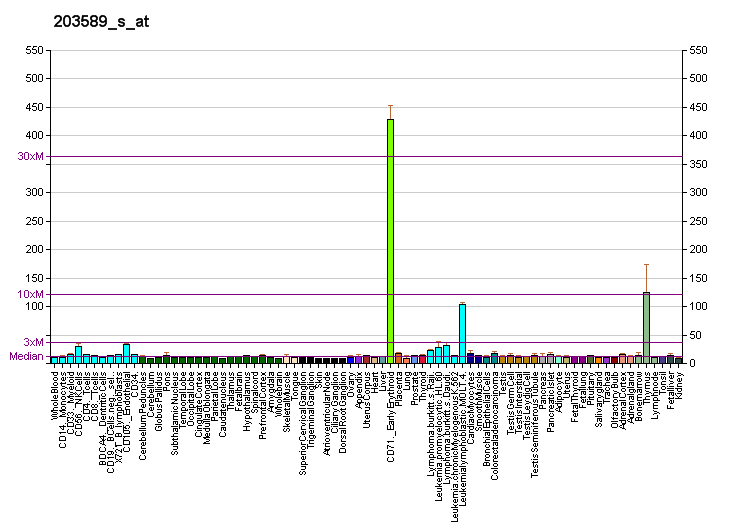

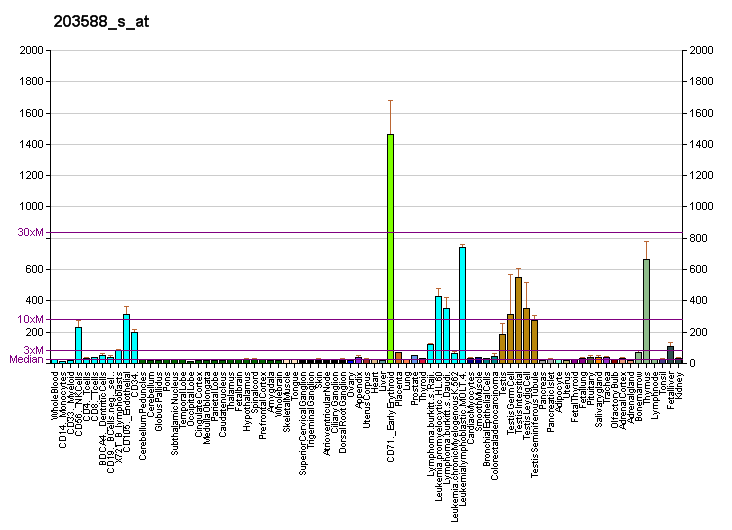
RNA expression pattern
Bgee	Human / Mouse (ortholog); Top expressed in: Achilles tendon; left testis; right testis; ventricular zone; bone marrow cell; thymus; ganglionic eminence; gonad; epithelium of colon; olfactory zone of nasal mucosa / Top expressed in: blood; otic vesicle; myocardium of ventricle; tibialis anterior muscle; interventricular septum; hand; tail of embryo; vastus lateralis muscle; genital tubercle; Epithelium of choroid plexus; More reference expression data
BioGPS	More reference expression data
Gene ontology
Molecular function	DNA-binding transcription factor activity; DNA binding; transcription factor binding; protein binding; transcription coregulator activity; protein domain specific binding; RNA polymerase II transcription regulatory region sequence-specific DNA binding; DNA-binding transcription activator activity, RNA polymerase II-specific; DNA-binding transcription factor activity, RNA polymerase II-specific
Cellular component	nucleus; transcription regulator complex; nucleoplasm; mitochondrion; RNA polymerase II transcription regulator complex
Biological process	regulation of transcription by RNA polymerase II; cell cycle; negative regulation of transcription, DNA-templated; regulation of transcription, DNA-templated; mitotic cell cycle; DNA damage response, signal transduction by p53 class mediator resulting in cell cycle arrest; development of the heart; transcription, DNA-templated; positive regulation of protein insertion into mitochondrial membrane involved in apoptotic signaling pathway; regulation of transcription involved in G1/S transition of mitotic cell cycle; transcription by RNA polymerase II; positive regulation of transcription by RNA polymerase II; negative regulation of G0 to G1 transition; regulation of cell cycle
Sources:Amigo / QuickGO
Orthologs
Databases	NCBI: entry; OMA: entry
Species	Human	Mouse
Entrez	7029	211586
Ensembl	ENSG00000114126	ENSMUSG00000032411
UniProt	Q14188	Q64163
RefSeq (mRNA)	NM_001178138; NM_001178139; NM_001178140; NM_001178141; NM_001178142 NM_006286; NM_001375756; NM_001375773; NM_001375774; NM_001375775; NM_001375776; NM_001375778; NM_001375779; NM_001375780	NM_001184706; NM_001184708; NM_001184709; NM_001184710; NM_001184711 NM_178667
RefSeq (protein)	NP_001171609; NP_001171610; NP_001171611; NP_001171612; NP_001171613 NP_006277; NP_001362685; NP_001362702; NP_001362703; NP_001362704; NP_001362705; NP_001362707; NP_001362708; NP_001362709	n/a
Location (UCSC)	Chr 3: 141.94 – 142.15 Mb	Chr 9: 96.2 – 96.32 Mb
PubMed search
- Wikidata
View/Edit Human	View/Edit Mouse

Transcription factor Dp-2 is a protein that in humans is encoded by the TFDP2 gene that dimerises with E2F, a key transcriptional activator involved in the regulation of the cell cycle.
