= PAN3 =

Protein-coding gene in the species Homo sapiens

Identifiers
- Aliases: PAN3, PAN3 poly(A) specific ribonuclease subunit, poly(A) specific ribonuclease subunit PAN3
- External IDs: OMIM: 617448; MGI: 1919837; GeneCards: PAN3

Gene location (Human)
Chr.	Chromosome 13 (human)
Band	13q12.2	Start	28,138,506 bp
Band	13q12.2	End	28,295,335 bp

Gene location (Mouse)
Chr.	Chromosome 5 (mouse)
Band	5|5 G3	Start	147,366,971 bp
Band	5|5 G3	End	147,485,312 bp
RNA expression pattern
Bgee	Human / Mouse (ortholog); Top expressed in: pancreatic ductal cell; secondary oocyte; thymus; trabecular bone; epithelium of nasopharynx; cerebellar vermis; skin of arm; mucosa of ileum; germinal epithelium; corpus epididymis / Top expressed in: zygote; secondary oocyte; genital tubercle; tail of embryo; spermatid; thymus; cerebellar cortex; spermatocyte; lobe of cerebellum; neural layer of retina; More reference expression data
BioGPS	n/a
Gene ontology
Molecular function	poly(A)-specific ribonuclease activity; protein kinase activity; nucleotide binding; protein binding; ATP binding; metal ion binding; RNA binding
Cellular component	cytoplasm; cytosol; PAN complex; P-body
Biological process	protein phosphorylation; protein targeting; mRNA processing; RNA phosphodiester bond hydrolysis, exonucleolytic; nuclear-transcribed mRNA poly(A) tail shortening; deadenylation-dependent decapping of nuclear-transcribed mRNA; positive regulation of cytoplasmic mRNA processing body assembly; nuclear-transcribed mRNA catabolic process, deadenylation-dependent decay
Sources:Amigo / QuickGO
Orthologs
Databases	NCBI: entry; OMA: entry
Species	Human	Mouse
Entrez	255967	72587
Ensembl	ENSG00000152520	ENSMUSG00000029647
UniProt	Q58A45	Q640Q5
RefSeq (mRNA)	NM_175854	NM_028291; NM_001359433
RefSeq (protein)	NP_787050	NP_082567; NP_001346362
Location (UCSC)	Chr 13: 28.14 – 28.3 Mb	Chr 5: 147.37 – 147.49 Mb
PubMed search
- Wikidata
View/Edit Human	View/Edit Mouse

PAN3 poly(A) specific ribonuclease subunit is a protein that in humans is encoded by the PAN3 gene. PAN3 is part of the PAN deadenylation complex involved in shortening mRNA.

== See also ==
- PAN2
