= PAN2 =

Protein-coding gene in the species Homo sapiens

Identifiers
- Aliases: PAN2, USP52, PAN2 poly(A) specific ribonuclease subunit, poly(A) specific ribonuclease subunit PAN2
- External IDs: OMIM: 617447; MGI: 1918984; GeneCards: PAN2
Enzyme activity
EC #	BRENDA	ExPASy	KEGG	MetaCyc
3.1.13.4	↗	↗	↗	↗

Gene location (Human)
Chr.	Chromosome 12 (human)
Band	12q13.3	Start	56,316,223 bp
Band	12q13.3	End	56,334,053 bp

Gene location (Mouse)
Chr.	Chromosome 10 (mouse)
Band	10|10 D3	Start	128,139,204 bp
Band	10|10 D3	End	128,157,227 bp
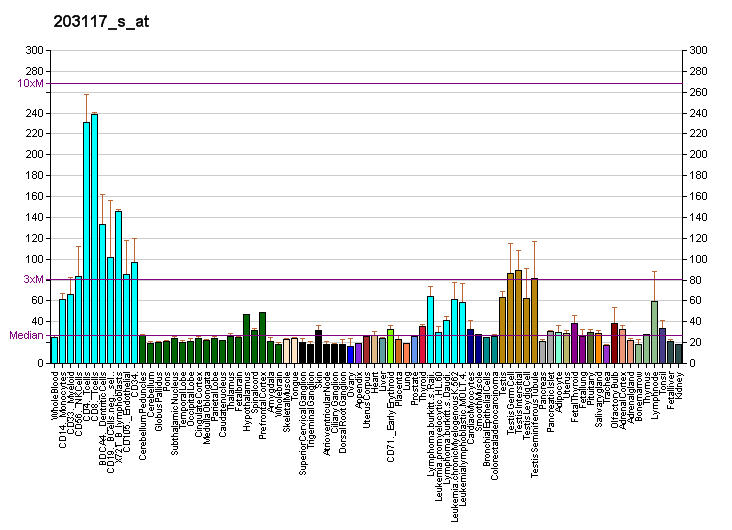
RNA expression pattern
Bgee	Human / Mouse (ortholog); Top expressed in: right lobe of thyroid gland; left lobe of thyroid gland; right hemisphere of cerebellum; right uterine tube; left ovary; anterior pituitary; right ovary; body of pancreas; right testis; left testis / Top expressed in: secondary oocyte; zygote; primary oocyte; tail of embryo; genital tubercle; neural layer of retina; granulocyte; hair follicle; endocardial cushion; epithelium of lens; More reference expression data
BioGPS	More reference expression data
Gene ontology
Molecular function	poly(A)-specific ribonuclease activity; nuclease activity; exonuclease activity; 3'-5'-exoribonuclease activity; protein binding; hydrolase activity; nucleic acid binding; metal ion binding
Cellular component	cytoplasm; PAN complex; cytosol; P-body; nucleus
Biological process	nuclear-transcribed mRNA poly(A) tail shortening; mRNA processing; nucleic acid phosphodiester bond hydrolysis; RNA phosphodiester bond hydrolysis, exonucleolytic; nuclear-transcribed mRNA catabolic process, deadenylation-dependent decay; positive regulation of cytoplasmic mRNA processing body assembly
Sources:Amigo / QuickGO
Orthologs
Databases	NCBI: entry; OMA: entry
Species	Human	Mouse
Entrez	9924	103135
Ensembl	ENSG00000135473	ENSMUSG00000005682
UniProt	Q504Q3	Q8BGF7
RefSeq (mRNA)	NM_014871; NM_001127460; NM_001166279	NM_001252326; NM_001252327; NM_133992; NM_001358822
RefSeq (protein)	NP_001120932; NP_001159751; NP_055686	NP_001239255; NP_001239256; NP_598753; NP_001345751
Location (UCSC)	Chr 12: 56.32 – 56.33 Mb	Chr 10: 128.14 – 128.16 Mb
PubMed search
- Wikidata
View/Edit Human	View/Edit Mouse

PAB-dependent poly(A)-specific ribonuclease subunit 2 is an enzyme that in humans is encoded by the PAN2 gene (previously USP52). PAN2 is involved in the degradation of mRNA in the cytoplasm. In particular, PAN2 functions as an enzymatic core of the PAN deadenylation complex, one of the two major deadenylases in the cytoplasm involved in mRNA turnover. PAN specifically is stimulated by PABP, and shortens the poly(A) tails of RNA.

== See also ==
- PAN3
