= P-TEFb =

Protein complex regulating transcription in eukaryotes

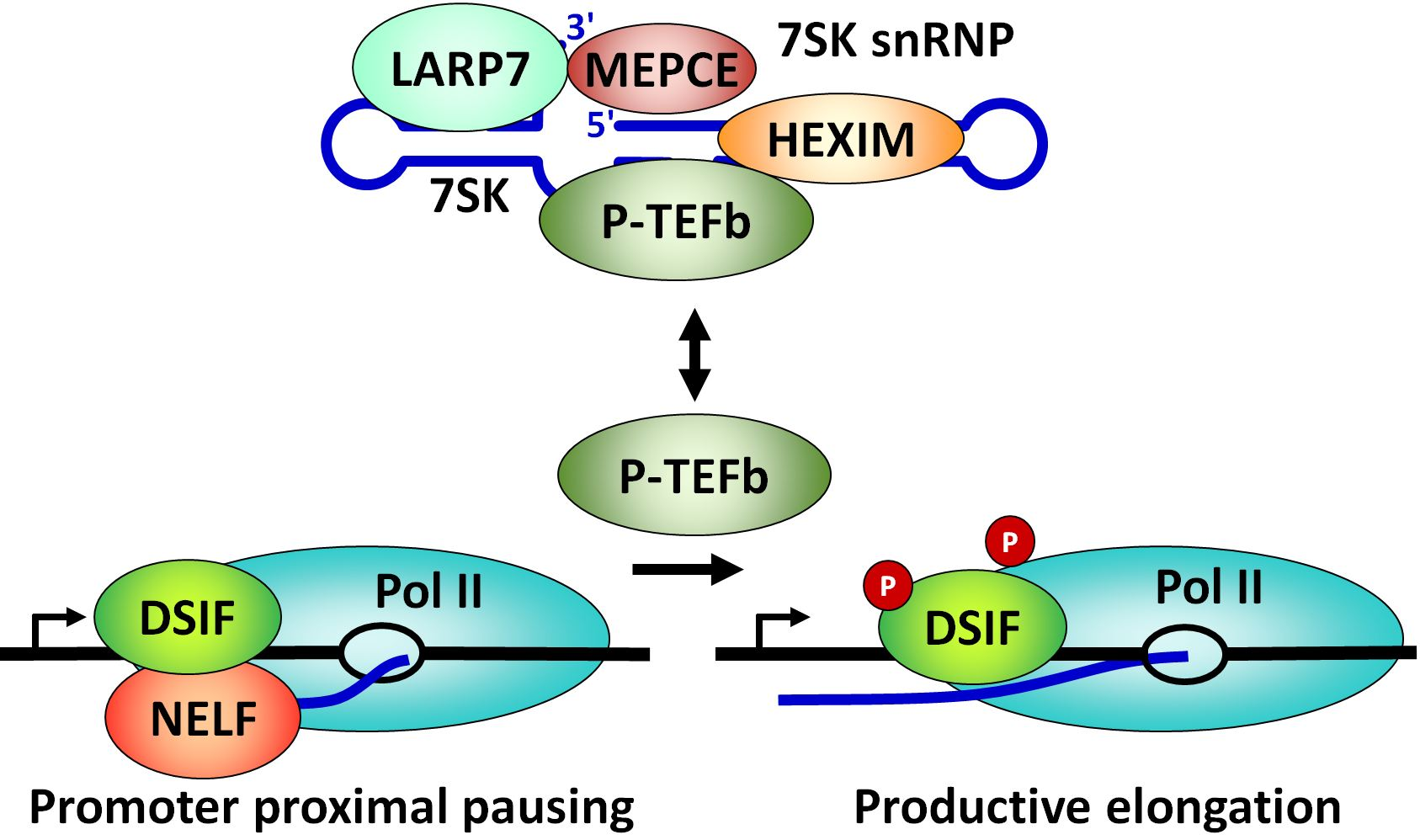
Figure 1. RNA polymerase II elongation control. Pol II comes under the control of negative elongation factors (DSIF and NELF) shortly after initiation. P-TEFb mediates a transition into productive elongation by phosphorylating the two negative factors and the polymerase and is regulated by association with the 7SK snRNP.

The positive transcription elongation factor, P-TEFb, is a multiprotein complex that plays an essential role in the regulation of transcription by RNA polymerase II (Pol II) in eukaryotes. Immediately following initiation Pol II becomes trapped in promoter-proximal paused positions on the majority of human genes (Figure 1). P-TEFb is a cyclin-dependent kinase that can phosphorylate the DRB sensitivity–inducing factor (DSIF) and negative elongation factor (NELF), as well as the carboxyl terminal domain of the large subunit of Pol II and this causes the transition into productive elongation leading to the synthesis of mRNAs. P-TEFb is regulated in part by a reversible association with the 7SK snRNP. Treatment of cells with the P-TEFb inhibitors DRB or flavopidirol leads to loss of mRNA production and ultimately cell death.

== Discovery ==
P-TEFb was identified and purified as a factor needed for the generation of long run-off transcripts using an in vitro transcription system derived from Drosophila cells.

== Components ==
It is a cyclin dependent kinase containing the catalytic subunit, Cdk9, and a regulatory subunit, cyclin T in Drosophila. In humans there are multiple forms of P-TEFb which contain Cdk9 and one of several cyclin subunits, cyclin T1, T2, and K. P-TEFb associates with other factors including the bromodomain protein BRD4, and is found associated with a large complex of proteins called the super elongation complex. Importantly, for the AIDS virus, HIV, P-TEFb is targeted by the HIV Tat protein which bypasses normal cellular P-TEFb control and directly brings P-TEFb to the promoter proximal paused polymerase in the HIV genome.

== Structure ==
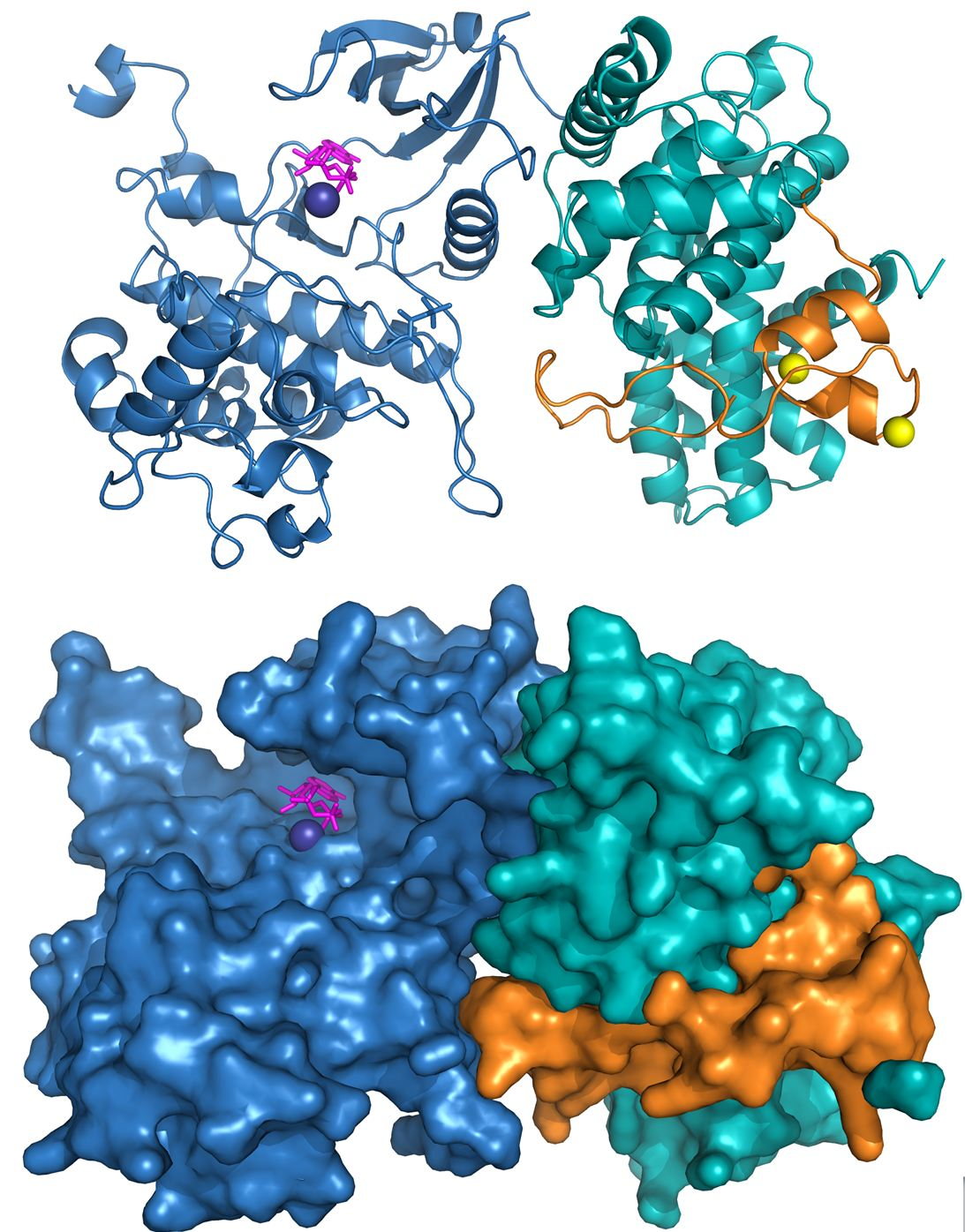
Figure 2. Structure of P-TEFb bound by HIV Tat. PDB ID: 3MIA Cdk9 (blue), cyclin T1 (cyan), Tat (orange), ATP (magenta), magnesium (purple), zinc atoms (yellow).

The structures of human P-TEFb containing Cdk9 and cyclin T1 and the HIV Tat•P-TEFb complex have been solved using X-ray crystallography. The first structure solved demonstrated that the two subunits were arranged as has been found in other cyclin dependent kinases. Three amino acid substitutions were inadvertently introduced in the subunits used for the original structure and a subsequent structure determination using the correct sequences demonstrated the same overall structure except for a few significant changes around the active site. The structure of HIV Tat bound to P-TEFb demonstrated that the viral protein forms extensive contacts with the cyclin T1 subunit (Figure 2).

== Regulation ==
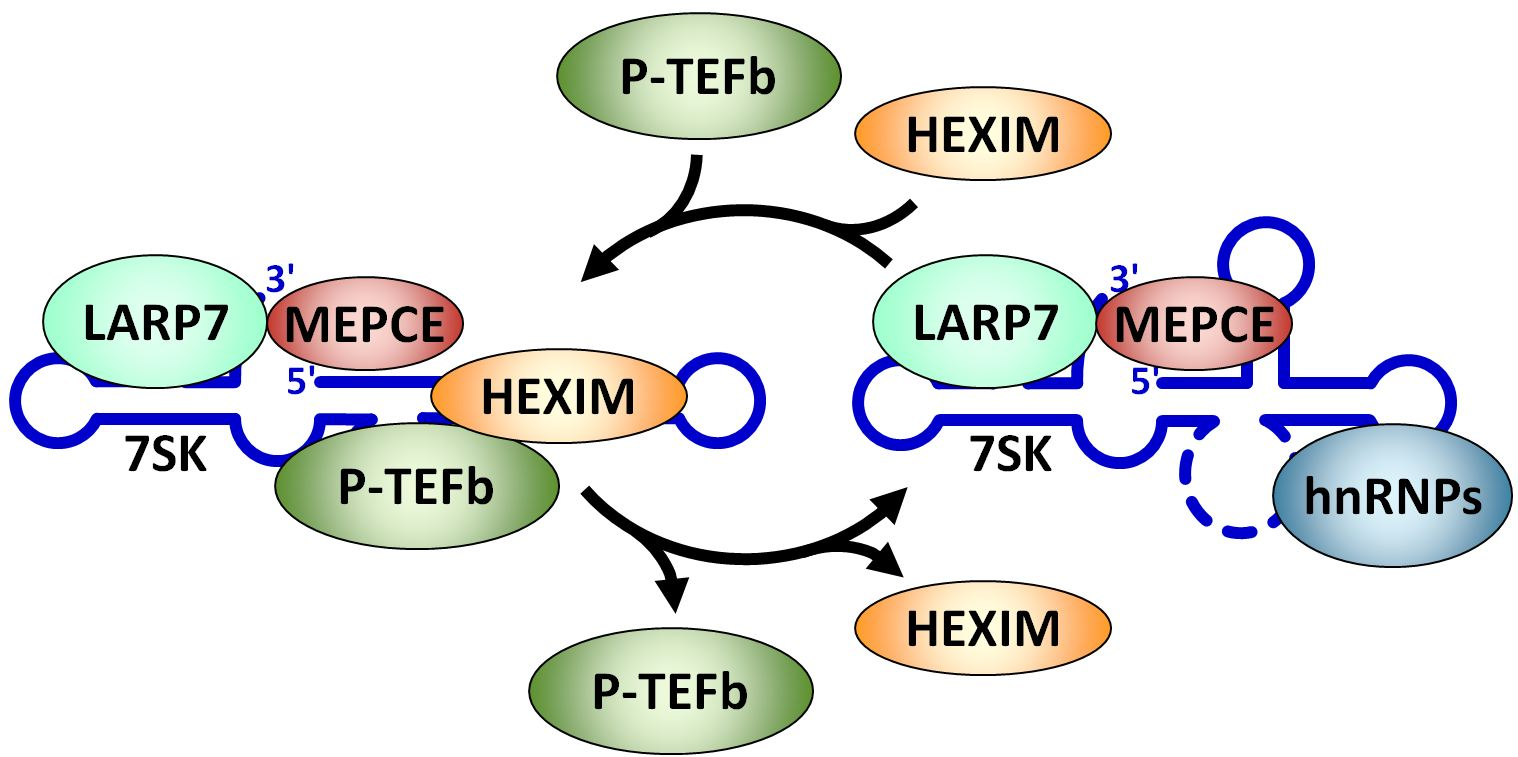
Figure 3. Reversible association of P-TEFb with the 7SK snRNP. P-TEFb is released from the 7SK snRNP by Brd4 or HIV Tat. HEXIM is ejected and the two proteins are replaced by hnRNPs. The reverse of this process requires other unknown factors.

Because of its central role in controlling eukaryotic gene expression, P-TEFb is subject to stringent regulation at the level of transcription of the genes encoding the subunits, translation of the subunit mRNAs, turnover of the subunits, and also by an unusual mechanism involving the 7SK snRNP. As shown in Figure 3 P-TEFb is held in the 7SK snRNP by the double stranded RNA binding protein HEXIM (HEXIM1 or HEXIM2 in humans). HEXIM bound to 7SK RNA or any double stranded RNA binds to P-TEFb and inhibits the kinase activity. Two other proteins are always found associated with 7SK RNA. The methyl phosphase capping enzyme MEPCE puts a methyl group on the gamma phosphate of the first nucleotide of the 7SK RNA and the La related protein LARP7 binds to the 3' end of 7SK. When P-TEFb is extracted from the 7SK snRNP, 7SK RNA undergoes a conformation change, HEXIM is ejected and hnRNPs take the place of the factors removed. The re-sequestration of P-TEFb requires another rearrangement of the RNA, binding of HEXIM and then P-TEFb. In rapidly growing cells the 7SK snRNP is the predominant form of P-TEFb. For review.
