= THAP3 =

Protein found in humans

Identifiers
- Aliases: THAP3, THAP domain containing 3
- External IDs: OMIM: 612532; MGI: 1917126; GeneCards: THAP3

Gene location (Human)
Chr.	Chromosome 1 (human)
Band	1p36.31	Start	6,624,868 bp
Band	1p36.31	End	6,635,586 bp

Gene location (Mouse)
Chr.	Chromosome 4 (mouse)
Band	4|4 E2	Start	152,067,096 bp
Band	4|4 E2	End	152,073,454 bp
RNA expression pattern
Bgee	Human / Mouse (ortholog); Top expressed in: apex of heart; right hemisphere of cerebellum; mucosa of transverse colon; gonad; canal of the cervix; right adrenal cortex; granulocyte; popliteal artery; tibial arteries; frontal pole / Top expressed in: otic vesicle; lip; muscle of thigh; knee joint; triceps brachii muscle; skeletal muscle tissue; temporal muscle; sternocleidomastoid muscle; quadriceps femoris muscle; vastus lateralis muscle; More reference expression data
BioGPS	n/a
Orthologs
Databases	NCBI: entry; OMA: entry
Species	Human	Mouse
Entrez	90326	69876
Ensembl	ENSG00000041988	ENSMUSG00000039759
UniProt	Q8WTV1	Q8BJ25
RefSeq (mRNA)	NM_001195752; NM_001195753; NM_138350; NM_001394496; NM_001394497 NM_001394498; NM_001394499; NM_001394500	NM_001145929; NM_175152
RefSeq (protein)	NP_001182681; NP_001182682; NP_612359	NP_001139401; NP_780361
Location (UCSC)	Chr 1: 6.62 – 6.64 Mb	Chr 4: 152.07 – 152.07 Mb
PubMed search
- Wikidata
View/Edit Human	View/Edit Mouse

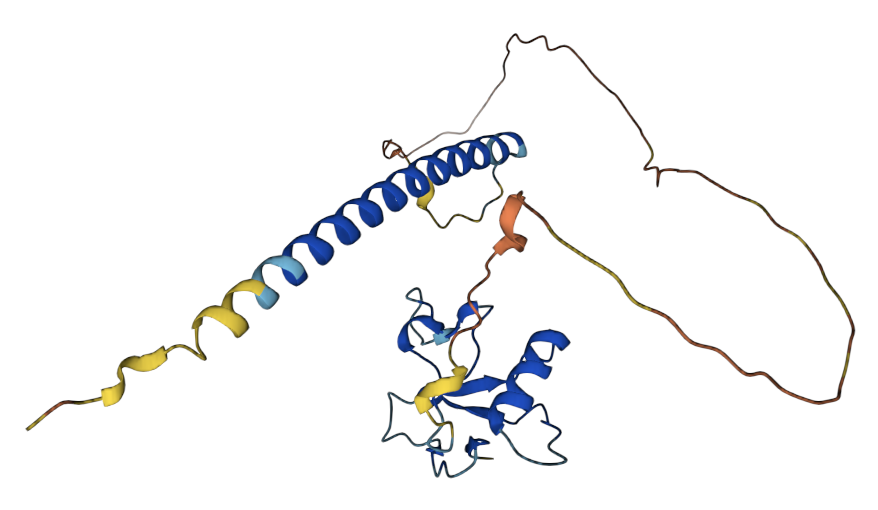
Predicted tertiary structure of Homo sapiens THAP3 protein

THAP domain-containing protein 3 (THAP3) is a protein that, in Homo sapiens (humans), is encoded by the THAP3 gene. The THAP3 protein is as known as MGC33488, LOC90326, and THAP domain-containing, apoptosis associated protein 3. This protein contains the Thanatos-associated protein (THAP) domain and a host-cell factor 1C binding motif. These domains allow THAP3 to influence a variety of processes, including transcription and neuronal development. THAP3 is ubiquitously expressed in humans, though expression is highest in the kidneys.

== Gene ==
The human THAP3 gene is a protein-encoding gene that is located on the plus strand of chromosome 1 at cytogenetic location 1p36.31. It is 10,727 base pairs long, spanning from genomic coordinates 6,624,868–6,635,595. It contains 6 exons.

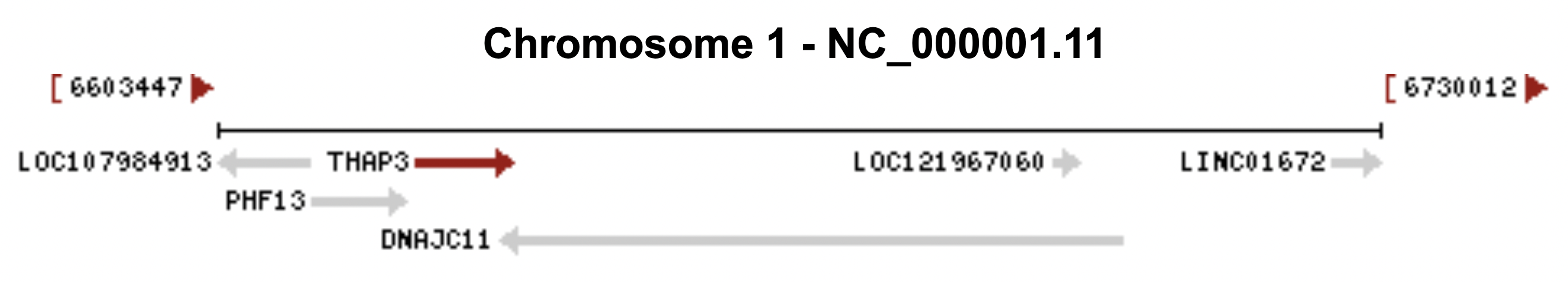
Gene neighborhood of human THAP3 gene on chromosome 1

=== Expression ===
In humans, THAP3 gene is expressed ubiquitously throughout different tissues, and expression is greatest in the kidneys. It has also been determined that expression of THAP3 tends to be slightly higher in organs located in the abdomen and male and female sexual organs, such as the ovaries, testes, prostate, adrenal gland, spleen, liver, and colon, though expression in the kidneys is 1.4–1.5x higher than those organs. THAP3 mRNA is 1.3x. more abundant in human fetal brain tissue than in H. sapiens adult kidney tissue.

== mRNA ==
Transcription of the THAP3 gene can result in 11 different mRNA variants, of which 8 are alternatively spliced and 3 are unspliced. Variant 1 is the predominant variant and encodes THAP3 protein isoform 1.

Alternatively spliced Homo sapiens THAP3 mRNA transcript variants
Variant	Sequence length (nucleotides)	Accession number
1	1358	NM_001195752.2
2	2071	NM_138350.4
3	1361	NM_001195753.2
4	1262	NM_001394496.1
5	2050	NM_001394497.1
6	2047	NM_001394498.1
7	1123	NM_001394499.1
8	1120	NM_001394500.1

== Protein ==
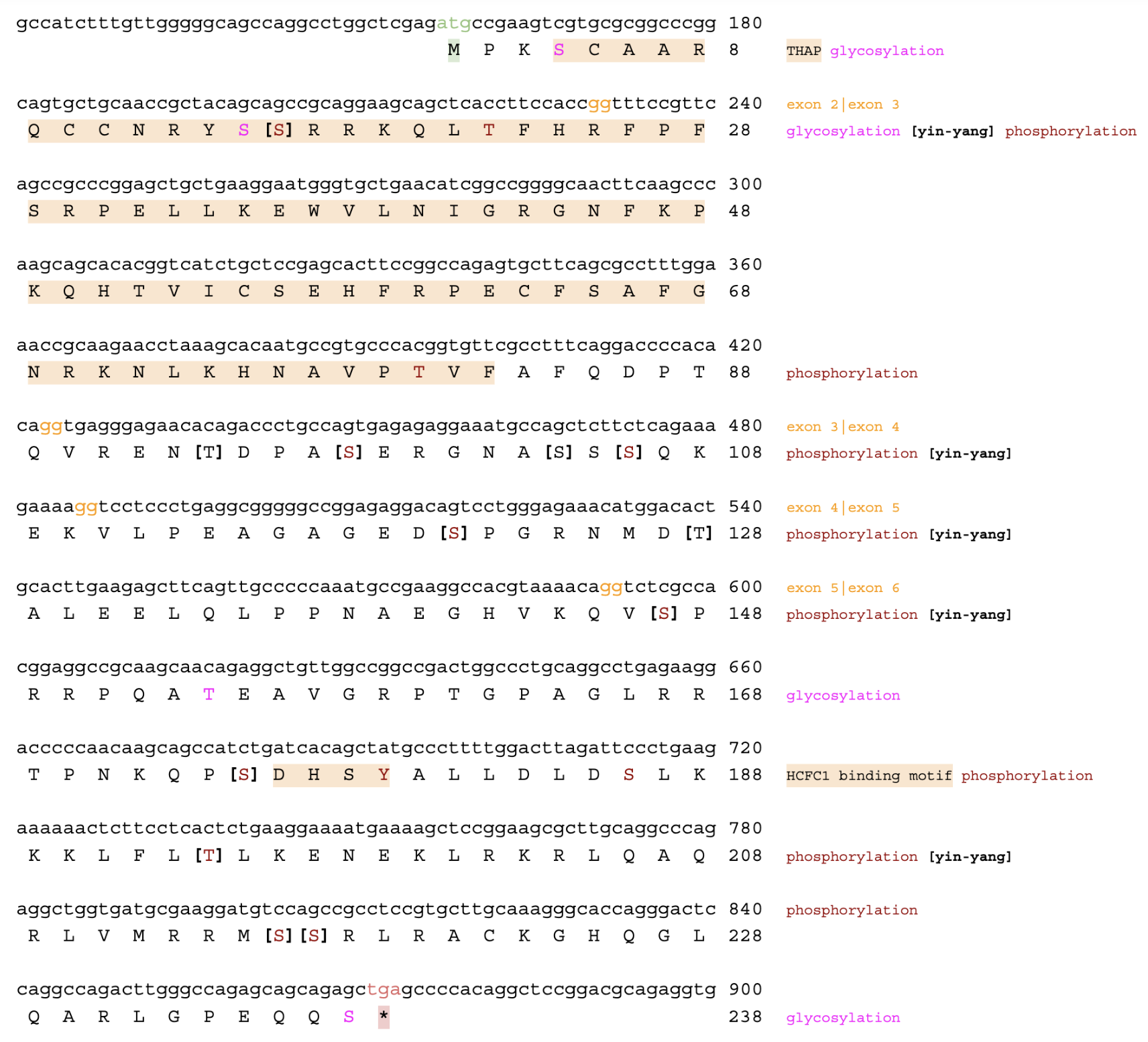
Conceptual translation of Homo sapiens THAP3 aligned mRNA and amino acid sequences. Annotated with start and stop sites of translations, protein domains, and predicted post-translational modification sites.

The human THAP3 protein is predicted to have a molecular weight of 26.9 kilodaltons and a pI of 10.26. The amino acid sequence is isoleucine and tyrosine rich and arginine poor. Characteristics domains of humans are the THAP domain (THAP) and the hell-cell factor 1C binding motif (HCM).

=== Isoforms ===
Due to having 8 alternatively spliced variants, there are 8 THAP3 isoforms.

Isoforms of Homo sapiens THAP3
Isoform	Sequence length (amino acids)	Accession number	Encoded by
1	238	NP_001182681.1	Variant 1
2	175	NP_612359.2	Variant 2
3	239	NP_001182682.1	Variant 3
4	236	NP_001381425.1	Variant 4
5	168	NP_001381426.1	Variant 5
6	167	NP_001381427.1	Variant 6
7	148	NP_001381428.1	Variant 7
8	147	NP_001381429.1	Variant 8

=== Structure ===
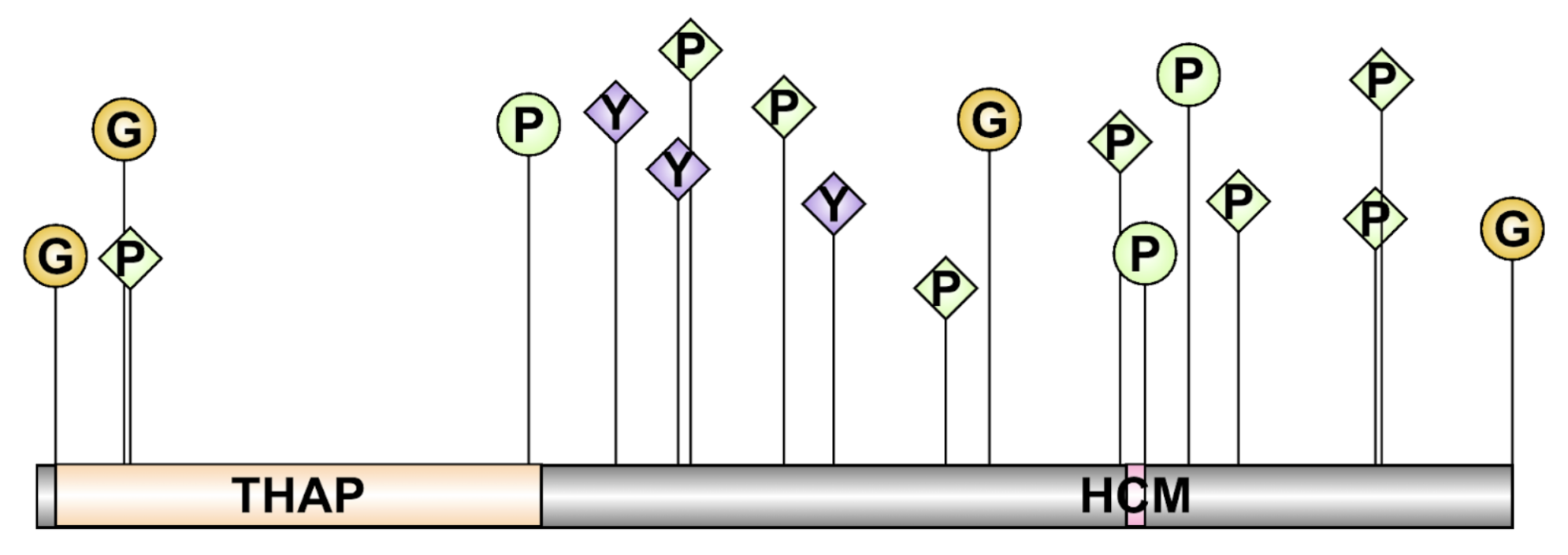
Schematic of Homo sapiens THAP3 protein sequence with annotated domains, predicted phosphorylation, glycosylation, and Yin-Yang sites. THAP represents the location of the THAP domain, and HBM represents the HCF1C binding motif. Yellow represents glycosylation sites (with scores over 0.5), green represents phosphorylation sites (with scores over 0.75), and diamond shapes represent Yin-Yang sites.

The predicted human THAP3 tertiary structure contains a globular region and an alpha helix. The globular region is located near the N-terminus of the sequence and is the structure of the THAP domain. It spans amino acids 4–82. The alpha helix is located from amino acids 186–230 and contains the host-cell factor 1C binding motif.

=== Regulation ===
==== Localization ====
THAP3 can be localized in the nucleus or mitochondria of human cells.

==== Post-translation modifications ====
The human THAP3 protein has 30 predicted phosphorylation sites, 28 predicted O-β-glycosylation sites, and 11 predicted Yin-Yang sites. Many proteins involved in transcription regulation are influenced by phosphorylation and glycosylation sites, which corroborates THAP3's function.

== Homology and evolution ==
=== Paralogs ===
The human THAP3 protein, along with several other proteins, is part of the THAP family of proteins. All of these proteins contain the THAP domain and are, thus, paralogs of H. sapiens THAP3.

Paralogs of Homo sapiens THAP3 protein
Protein Name	E-Value!	Percent identity to THAP3
THAP1	8×10^{−23}	48.00
THAP2	6×10^{−17}	45.24
THAP5	4×10^{−13}	31.96
THAP6	6×10^{−6}	34.44
THAP7	1×10^{−7}	33.33
THAP8	8×10^{−11}	31.96
THAP9	2×10^{−8}	32.99

=== Orthologs ===
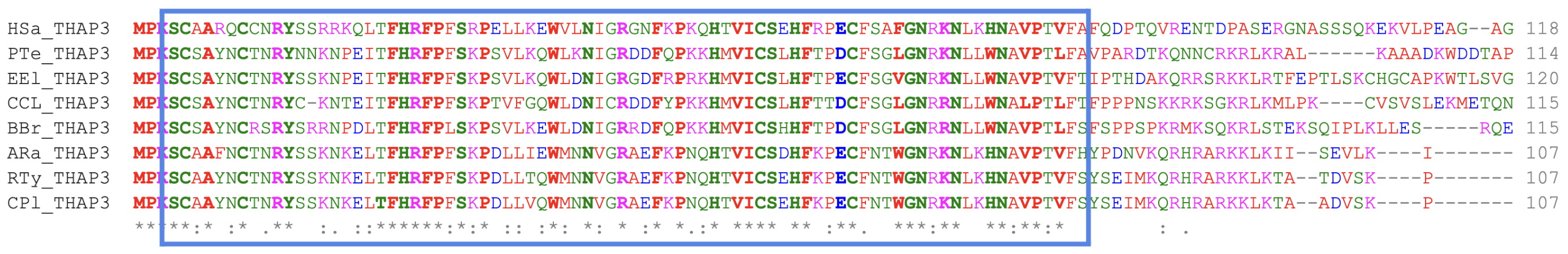
Multiple sequence alignment of THAP domain in Homo sapiens THAP3 (HSa THAP3; accession number NP 001182681.1) with distant orthologs. Boxing represents the location of the THAP domain in humans. Bolding and asterisks below groups of sequence indicate that an amino acid is highly conserved at that position. Full sequences include that of Sumatra barb (PTe THAP3), electric eel (EEl THAP3), lake whitefish (CCL THAP3), Baby whale (BBr THAP3), whale shark (ARa THAP3), white-spotted bamboo shark (RTy THAP3), and thorny skate (CPl THAP3). Accession numbers as in ortholog table.

There are approximately 206 orthlologs of human THAP3. Orthologs can be found in a variety of taxomonic classes, including mammals, reptiles, amphibians, bony fishes, and cartilaginous fishes. However, there are no orthologs in bacteria, fungi, protists, archaea, plants, invertebrates, or birds. Additionally, not all orders are represented within a class. For example, in reptiles, orthologs to human THAP3 are found in testudines (turtles or tortoises) and not found in crocodilia (crocodiles and alligators) or squamata (lizards and snakes). Similarly, there are only orthologs in apoda within amphibians. There are no orthologs in anura (frogs) or urodela (salamanders).

In closely related organisms, those diverged 0–160 million years ago (MYA), percent similarity of orthologs ranges from 36–82.9%. THAP3 sequences in rodents are the least conserved compared to humans. Sequences that diverged 319-353 MYA, those moderately related, have 47.2–68.9% similarity to human THAP3, and 41.3–54.1% similarity in organisms that are distantly related, diverged 431–464 MYA.

Orthologs of Homo sapiens THAP3
Taxonomic Class	Scientific Name	Common Name	Taxonomic Order	Date of Divergence	Accession Number	Percent Identity to THAP3	Percent Similarity to THAP3
Mammals	Marmota flaviventris	Yellow-bellied marmot	Rodentia	87	XP_027803226.1	29.9	36
	Lontra canadensis	North American river otter	Carnivora	94	XP_032719186.1	59.5	65.8
	Eptesicus fuscus	Big brown bat	Chiroptera	94	XP_028016747.1	65.0	69.6
	Balaenoptera musculus	Blue whale	Cetacea	94	XP_036686252.1	77.5	82.9
	Dromiciops gliroides	Colocolo opossum	Microbiotheria	160	XP_043850206.1	64.6	74.5
	Phascolarctos cinereus	Koala	Diprotodontia	160	XP_020830574.1	65.7	76.4
Reptiles	Caretta caretta	Loggerhead turtle	Testudines	319	XP_048680971.1	36.9	47.2
	Gopherus evgoodei	Goode's thornscrub tortoise	Testudines	319	XP_030393185.1	48.9	58.1
	Chelonoidis abingdonii	Abingdon Island giant tortoise	Testudines	319	XP_032619750.1	48.9	61.4
	Mauremys mutica	Yellow pond turtle	Testudines	319	XP_044852367.1	49.0	60.9
Amphibians	Microcaecilia unicolor	Microcaecilia unicolor	Gymnophiona	353	XP_030041702.1	41.2	56.8
	Geotrypetes seraphini	Gaboon caecilian	Gymnophiona	353	XP_033777236.1	44.2	57.8
Bony Fishes	Electrophorus electricus	Electric eel	Gymnotiformes	431	XP_026873261.2	31.9	41.3
	Coregonus clupeaformis	Lake whitefish	Salmoniformes	431	XP_041712304.2	32.9	47.7
	Brienomyrus brachyistius	Baby whale	Osteoglossiformes	431	XP_048872538.1	33.5	46.3
	Puntigrus tetrazona	Sumatra barb	Cypriniformes	431	XP_043081346.1	34.0	48.1
Cartilaginous Fishes	Rhincodon typus	Whale shark	Orectolobiformes	464	XP_020386430.1	39.0	53.4
	Chiloscyllium plagiosum	White-spotted bamboo shark	Orectolobiformes	464	XP_043531920.1	39.0	53.0
	Amblyraja radiata	Thorny skate	Rajiformes	464	XP_032904038.1	40.2	54.1

=== Evolution ===
Human THAP3 has evolved at a rate similar to human fibrinogen alpha, which is involved in the immune system.

== Protein interactions ==
Human THAP3 interacts with proteins involved in various cellular processes, like transcription regulation and neuronal development. It is also interacts with molecular chaperones during its translation.

Homo sapiens THAP3 Protein Interactions
Process	Protein Name	Identified By!	Interaction Type
Transcription Regulation	CHAT	two hybrid assay	Functional
	FGFR3	two hybrid assay	Functional
	HCF1C	affinity capture - mass spectrometry	Functional
	OGT	affinity capture - mass spectrometry	Functional
	PKN1	two hybrid assay	Functional
	POLR2A	two hybrid assay	Functional
	TARDBP	two hybrid assay	Functional
Neuronal Development	LSAMP	two hybrid assay	Functional
	DNAJB6	two hybrid assay	Functional
Protein Folding	BAG6	two hybrid assay	Developmental

== Clinical significance ==
THAP3 contributes to the presentation of X-linked dystonia parkinsonism, also known as Lubag syndrome. This disease is a neurodegenerative movement disorder that predominantly affects males of Filipino descent. Symptoms include tremors, bradykinesia, rigidity, postural instability, shuffling gait and dystonia, which typically develops later in life.
