= FAM227B =

Protein-coding gene in the species Homo sapiens

Identifiers
- Aliases: FAM227B, C15orf33, family with sequence similarity 227 member B
- External IDs: MGI: 1923073; GeneCards: FAM227B

Gene location (Human)
Chr.	Chromosome 15 (human)
Band	15q21.2	Start	49,326,962 bp
Band	15q21.2	End	49,620,929 bp

Gene location (Mouse)
Chr.	Chromosome 2 (mouse)
Band	2|2 F1	Start	125,825,403 bp
Band	2|2 F1	End	125,993,924 bp
RNA expression pattern
Bgee	Human / Mouse (ortholog); Top expressed in: testicle; buccal mucosa cell; gonad; right uterine tube; Achilles tendon; left testis; right testis; muscle of thigh; gastrocnemius muscle; islet of Langerhans / Top expressed in: spermatid; spermatocyte; seminiferous tubule; deep cerebellar nuclei; lumbar subsegment of spinal cord; medial vestibular nucleus; dorsal tegmental nucleus; mammillary body; lobe of cerebellum; ventral tegmental area; More reference expression data
BioGPS	n/a
Orthologs
Databases	NCBI: entry; OMA: entry
Species	Human	Mouse
Entrez	196951	75823
Ensembl	ENSG00000166262	ENSMUSG00000027209
UniProt	Q96M60	Q9D518
RefSeq (mRNA)	NM_152647; NM_001330293	NM_029455
RefSeq (protein)	NP_001317222; NP_689860	NP_083731
Location (UCSC)	Chr 15: 49.33 – 49.62 Mb	Chr 2: 125.83 – 125.99 Mb
PubMed search
- Wikidata
View/Edit Human	View/Edit Mouse

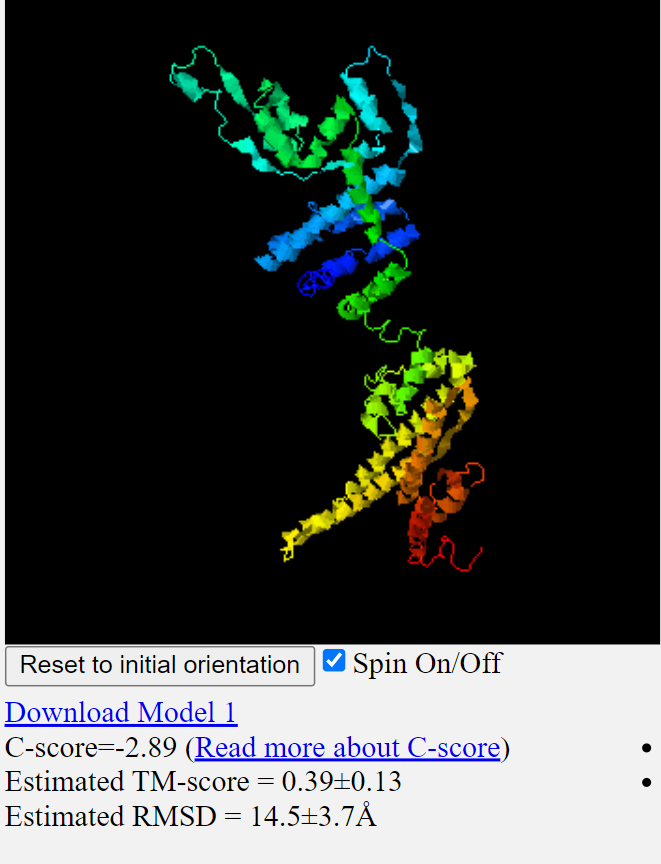

FAM227B is a protein that in humans is encoded by FAM227B gene. FAM227B stands for family with sequence similarity 227 member B and encodes protein FAM227B of the same name. Its aliases include C15orf33, MGC57432 and FLJ23800.

== Gene ==
FAM227B is located at 15q21.2 and contains 24 exons. The current size determined for FAM227B is 293,961 base pairs (NCBI). Neighbors of FAM227B on chromosome fifteen include: "ribosomal protein L15 pseudogene", "galactokinase 2", "RNA, 7SL, cytoplasmic 307, pseudogene", "signal peptide peptidase like 2A pseudogene", "fibroblast growth factor 7", "uncharacterized LOC105370811", "DTW domain containing 1", and "ring finger protein, LIM domain interacting pseudogene 3".

== Transcript ==
There are 30 isoforms of FAM227B and one paralog, FAM227A. The conserved domains in these isoforms (as well as the paralog) are of various sizes and encode the protein FWWh (pfam14922) of unknown function, which all contain the distinctive motif FWW with a hydrophobic residue h. The main isoform used for analysis of FAM227B is isoform 1 (NM_152647.3). The next most reliable isoform of FAM227B is isoform 2 ( NM_001330293.2). The second isoform is shorter and has a distinct C-terminus.

Below are cartoons depicting the different lengths and cutting patterns of the isoforms*:

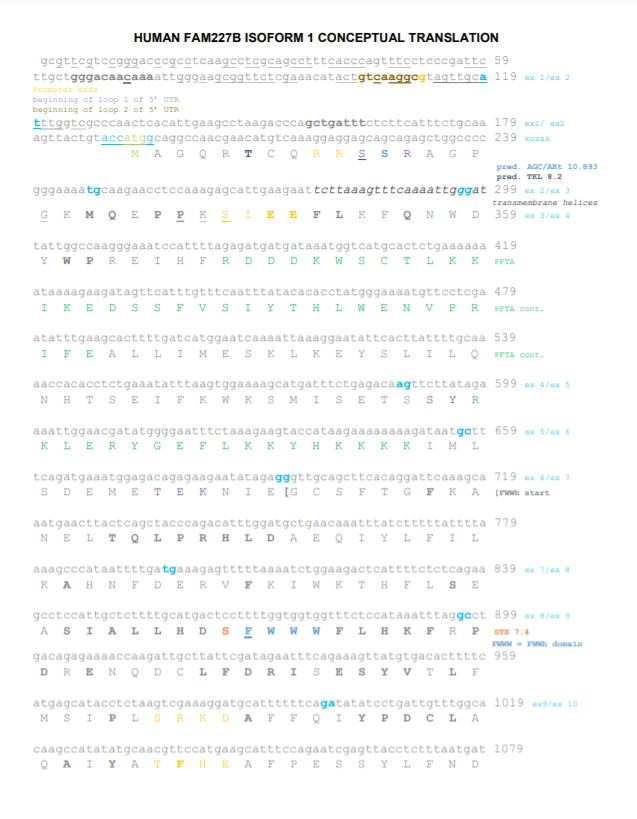

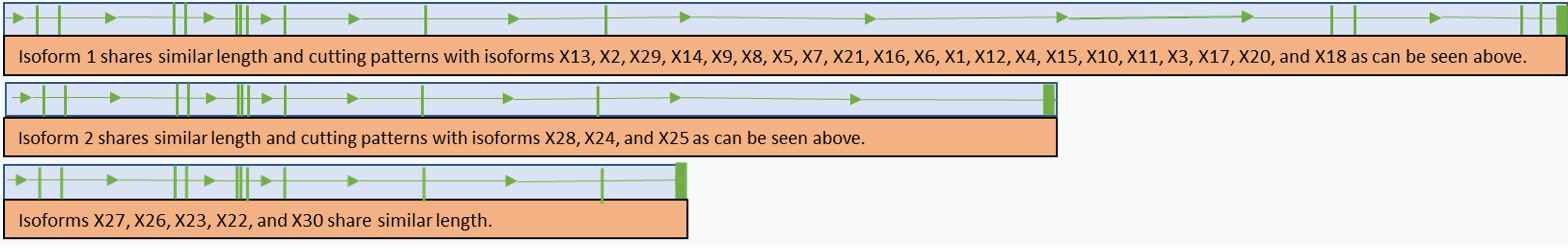

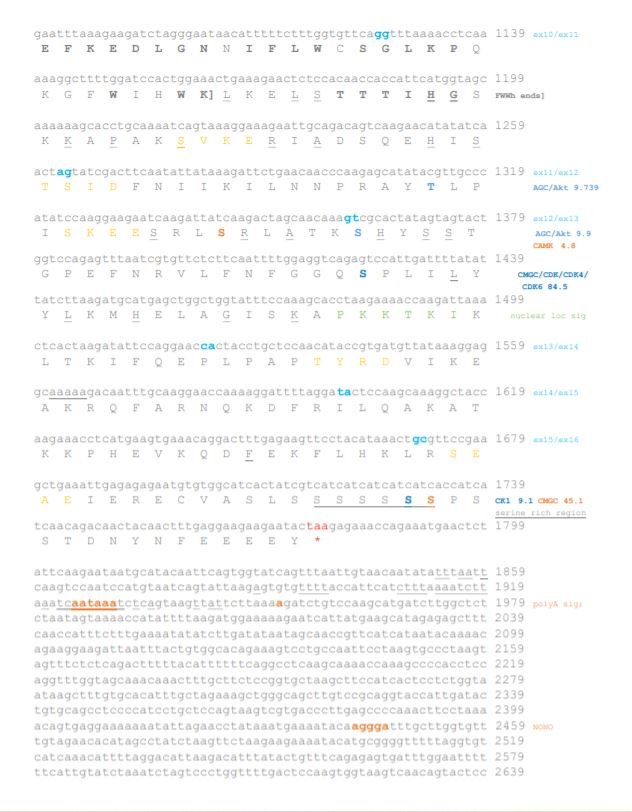

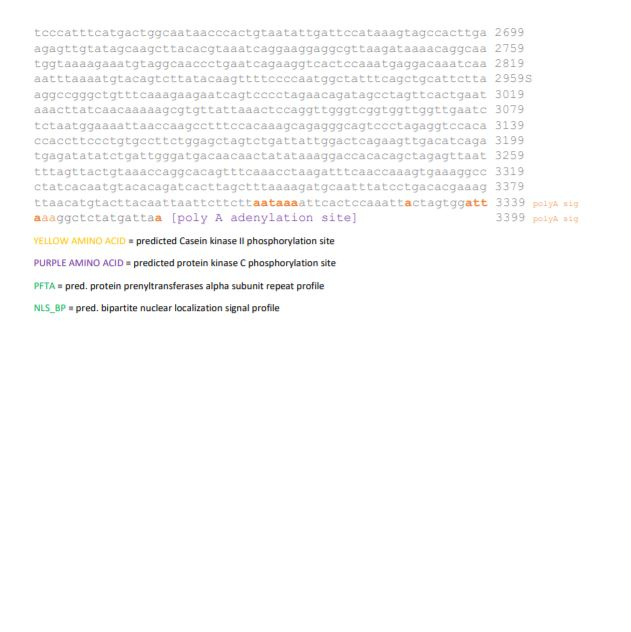

*The cartoons do not precisely depict differences between all the isoforms, but instead act as a simple depiction of a larger pattern between the isoforms.

== Protein ==
The primary sequence for FAM227B is isoform 1 with accession number: NP_689860.2. It is 508 amino acids long. There are 30 isoforms. The molecular weight is 59.9kD and the isoelectric point is predicted to be high, around 10. Compared to other proteins in humans, FAM227B has high abundance of Phenylalanine and Glycine and low abundance levels of Valine. The protein is predicted to be in the nuclear region of the cell. There is a bipartite nuclear localization signal at RKLERYGEFLKKYHKKK, and three other nuclearization signals at HKKK, KKKK, and PKKTKIK. There is also a vacuolar targeting motif at TLPI. An FWWh region, where h signifies hydrophobic, runs from amino acids 135-296 in Homo sapiens FAM227B isoform 1. The function of this region is still unknown.

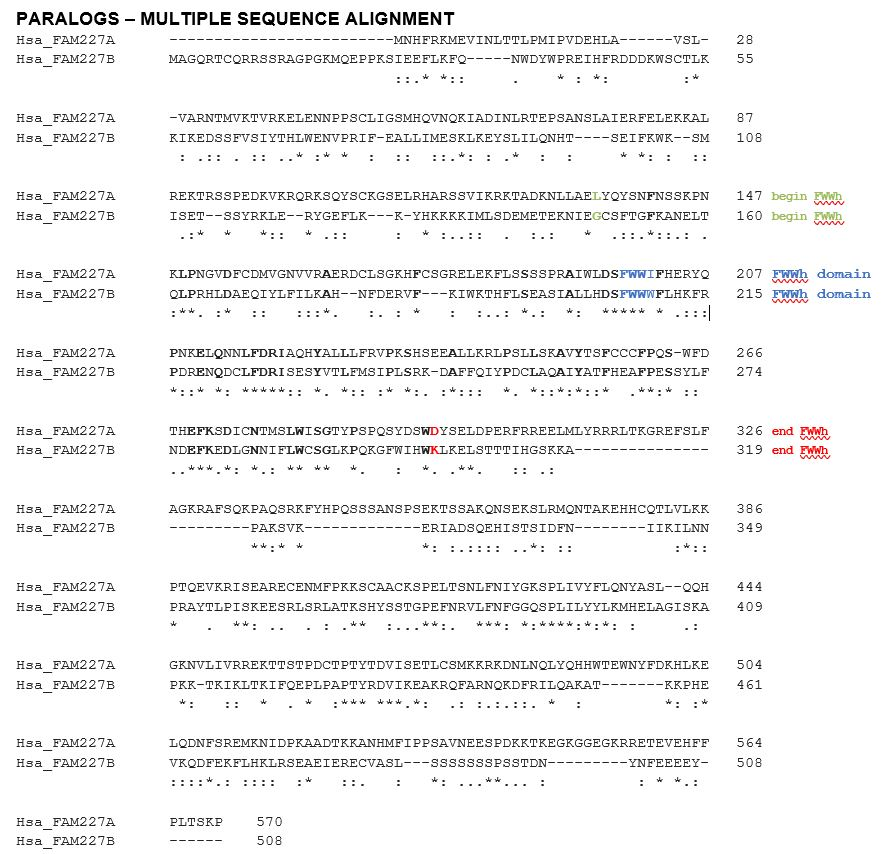

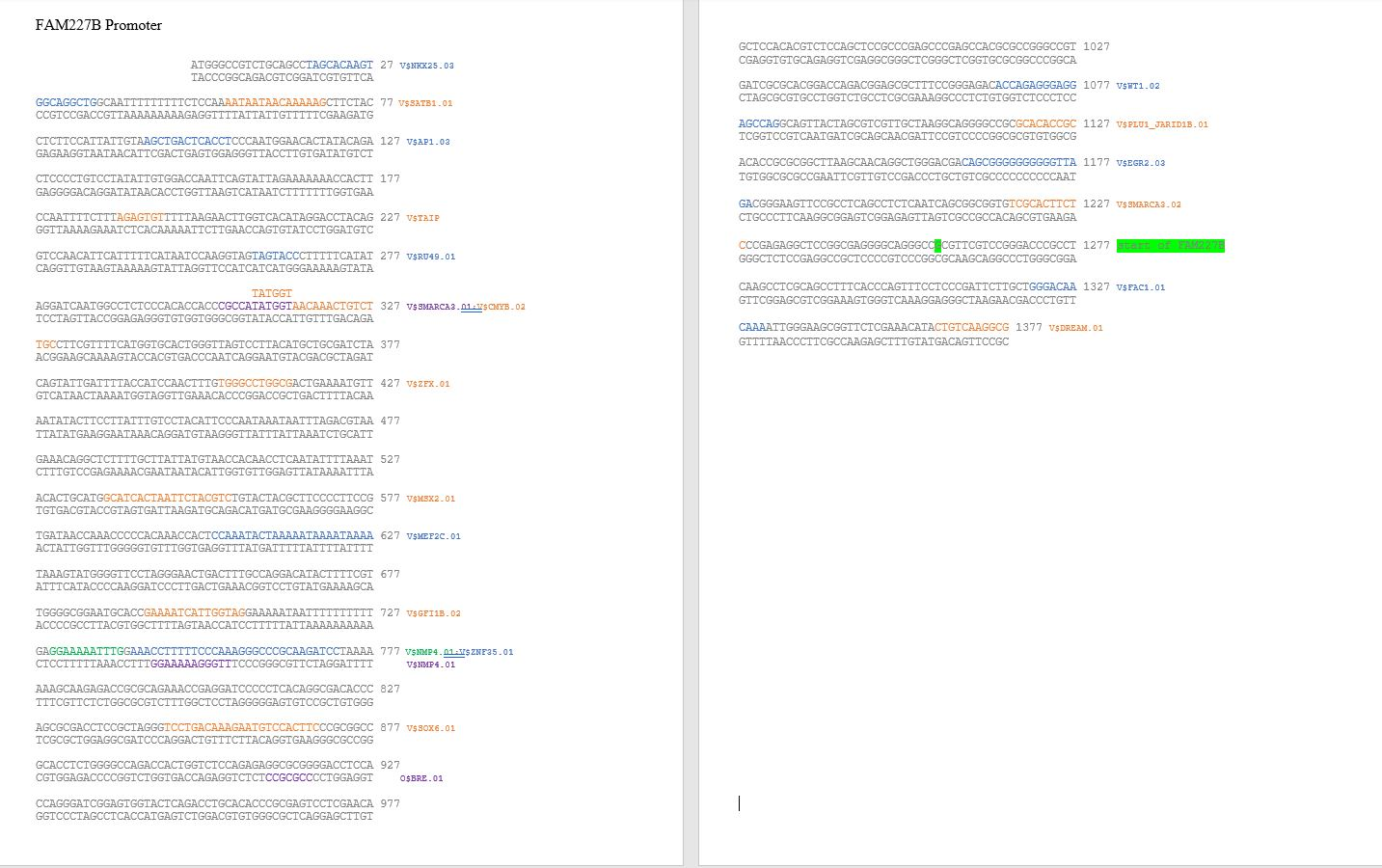

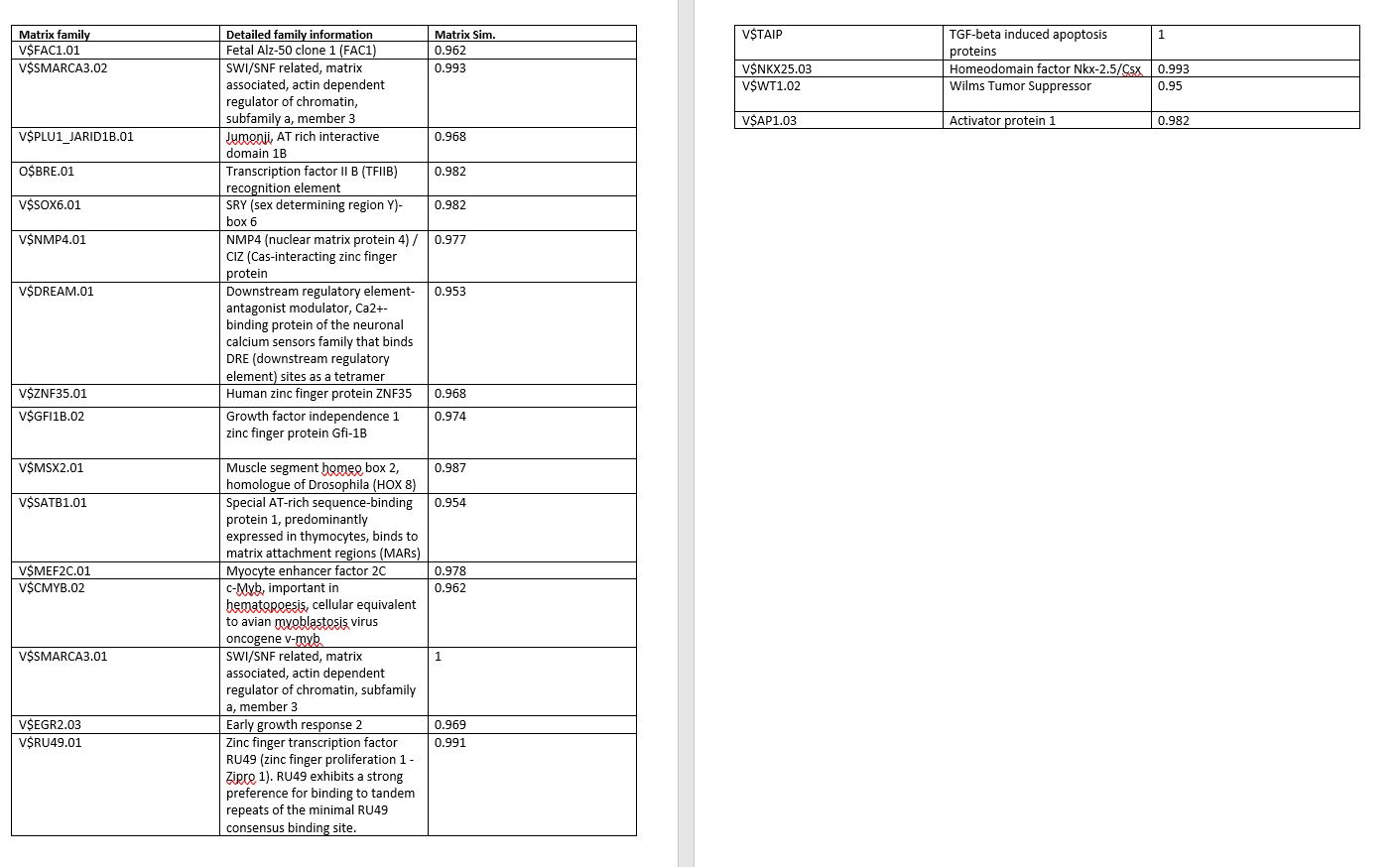

== Secondary structure ==
The secondary structure is predicted to be made up of alpha helices mainly and coiled coils

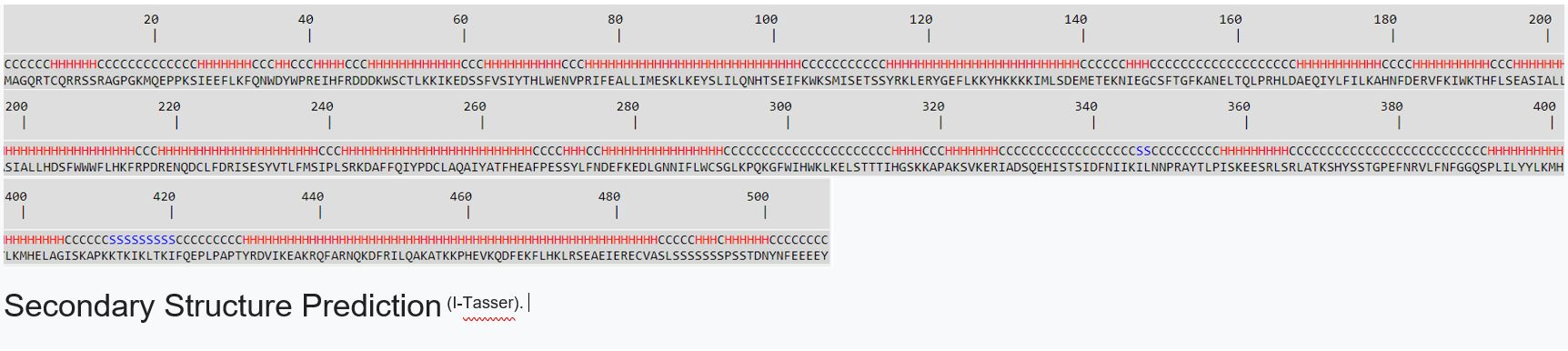

== Post translational modifications ==
Phosphorylation is the main post-translational modification predicted for FAM227B due to its predicted localization to the nucleus. There are many experimentally predicted phosphorylation sites, the most highly rated included in the conceptual translation. Glycosylation sites and SUMOylation sites were also predicted.

== Expression ==
FAM227B is most highly expressed in the testis at 1.983 +/- 0.404 RPKM, in the kidney at 1.408 +/- 0.152 RPKM, in the adrenal at 1.177 +/- 0.088 RPKM, and in the thyroid 1.133 +/- 0.165 RPKM. It is also expressed to a lesser degree in the appendix, bone marrow, brain, colon, duodenum, endometrium, esophagus, fat, gall bladder, heart, liver, lung, lymph node, ovary, pancreas, placenta, prostate, salivary gland, skin, small intestine, spleen, stomach, and urinary bladder

== Function ==
Currently, the function of FAM227B has not been characterized

== Protein-protein interactions ==
RNF123 was found to be an interacting protein of FAM227B through Affinity Capture – MS. RAB3A was found to be an interacting protein of FAM227B through tandem affinity purification.

== Subcellular localization ==
Current studies have determined the location of this gene to be in the nuclear region of the cell.

== Homology and evolution ==
Paralogs: FAM227A

Orthologs: FAM227B is present in Deuterostomia and Protostomia, dating as far back as porifera. FAM227B is not present in choanoflagellates, and gene alignment sequences have shown that FAM227B is a rapidly evolving gene due to its evolution trajectory compared to cytochrome c and fibrinogen alpha.

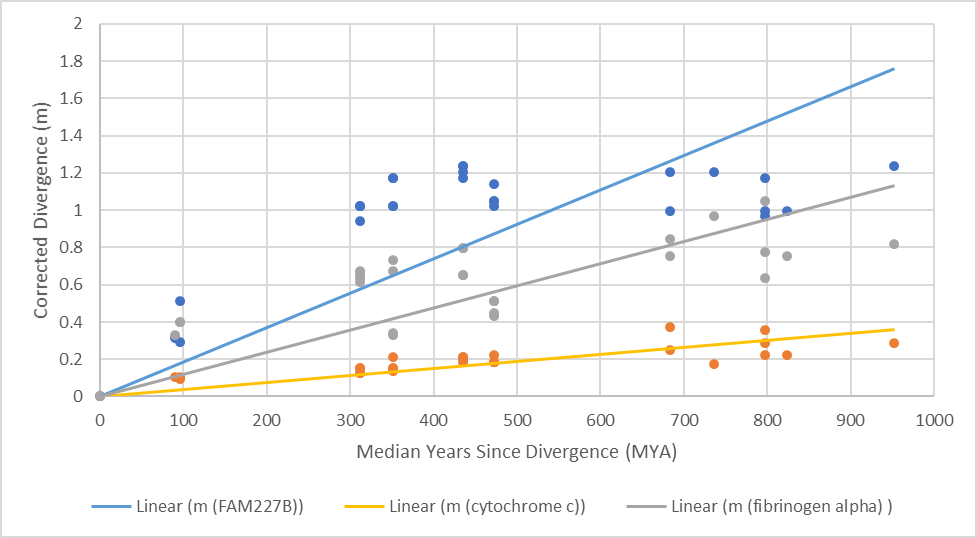

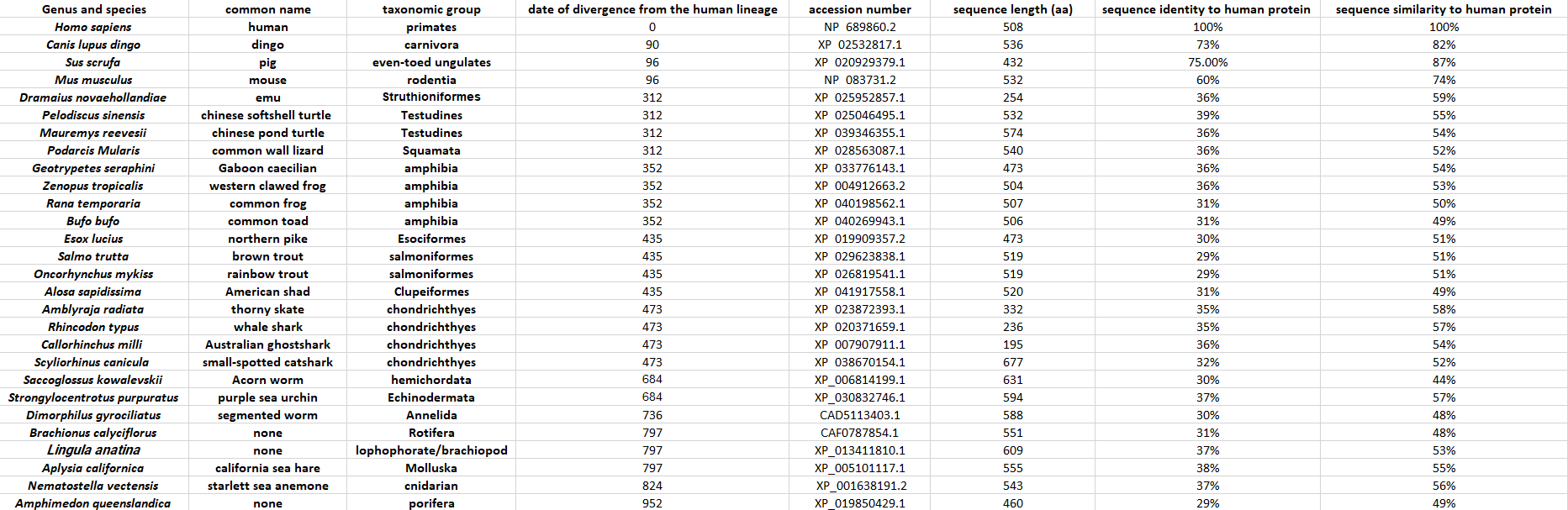

== Clinical significance ==
The location of FAM227B, 15q21.2, was found to be associated with oral cancer. The 15q21.2 locus is mentioned in other literature as well. FGF7 is a neighbour of FAM227B in the 15q21.2 locus (rs10519227), and encodes for the fibroblast growth factor, which is involved in processes such as embryonic development, cell growth, tissue repair, tumor growth, invasion, and morphogenesis. FGF works as a signal for thyroid gland development, and an SNP on intron 2 of FGF7 has been associated with thyroid growth/goiter growth. This association was only significant at the genome level in males. It was found that the abnormal goiter growth is likely due to variant signals that cause increased levels of TSH. FAM227B was found to be related to at least some of the 48 significant DMRs (differentially methylated regions) between HF (high fertile) and LF (low fertile) groups in the genome of spermatozoa from boar animal model. FAM227B was found to be upregulated in LOXL2 knockdown. Knocking down LOXL2 results in lower levels of H3K4ox, resulting in chromatin decompaction, thus continuing activation of DNA damage response. This results in anticancer agents being more effective against cancerous cell lines. FAM227B was found to be a genetic risk variant in breast cancer. FAM227B was differentially expressed in prostrate genes of Esr2 knockout rats compared to wildtype rats. Esr2 is involved in anti-proliferation and differentiation. FAM227B was part of 20 upregulated genes in chorionic girdle during trophoblast development in horses. Protein FAM227B was differentially expressed in cardiovascular disease. FAM227B was found to be a candidate causal gene for lung cancer. FAM227B has a predicted p53 binding site.
