= Chem-seq =

Technique for mapping interactions between molecules and their protein targets

Chem-seq is a technique that is used to map genome-wide interactions between small molecules and their protein targets in the chromatin of eukaryotic cell nuclei. The method employs chemical affinity capture coupled with massively parallel DNA sequencing to identify genomic sites where small molecules interact with their target proteins or DNA. It was first described by Lars Anders et al. in the January, 2014 issue of "Nature Biotechnology".

== Uses of Chem-seq ==
A substantial number of small-molecule ligands, including therapeutic drugs, elicit their effects by binding specific proteins associated with the genome. Mapping the global interactions of these chemical entities with chromatin in a genome-wide manner could provide insights into the mechanisms by which a small molecule influences cellular functions. When combined with other chromatin analysis techniques such as ChIP-seq, Chem-seq can be utilized to investigate the genome-wide effects of therapeutic modalities and to understand the effects of drugs on nuclear architecture in various biological contexts. In a broader sense, these methods will be useful to enhance our understanding of the therapeutic mechanisms through which small molecules modulate the function and activity of genome-associated proteins. Through the identification of the cellular targets of a drug, it becomes possible to gain an increased understanding of the causes of side effects and toxicity in the early stages of drug development, which should help to reduce the attrition rate in development.

== Workflow of Chem-seq ==
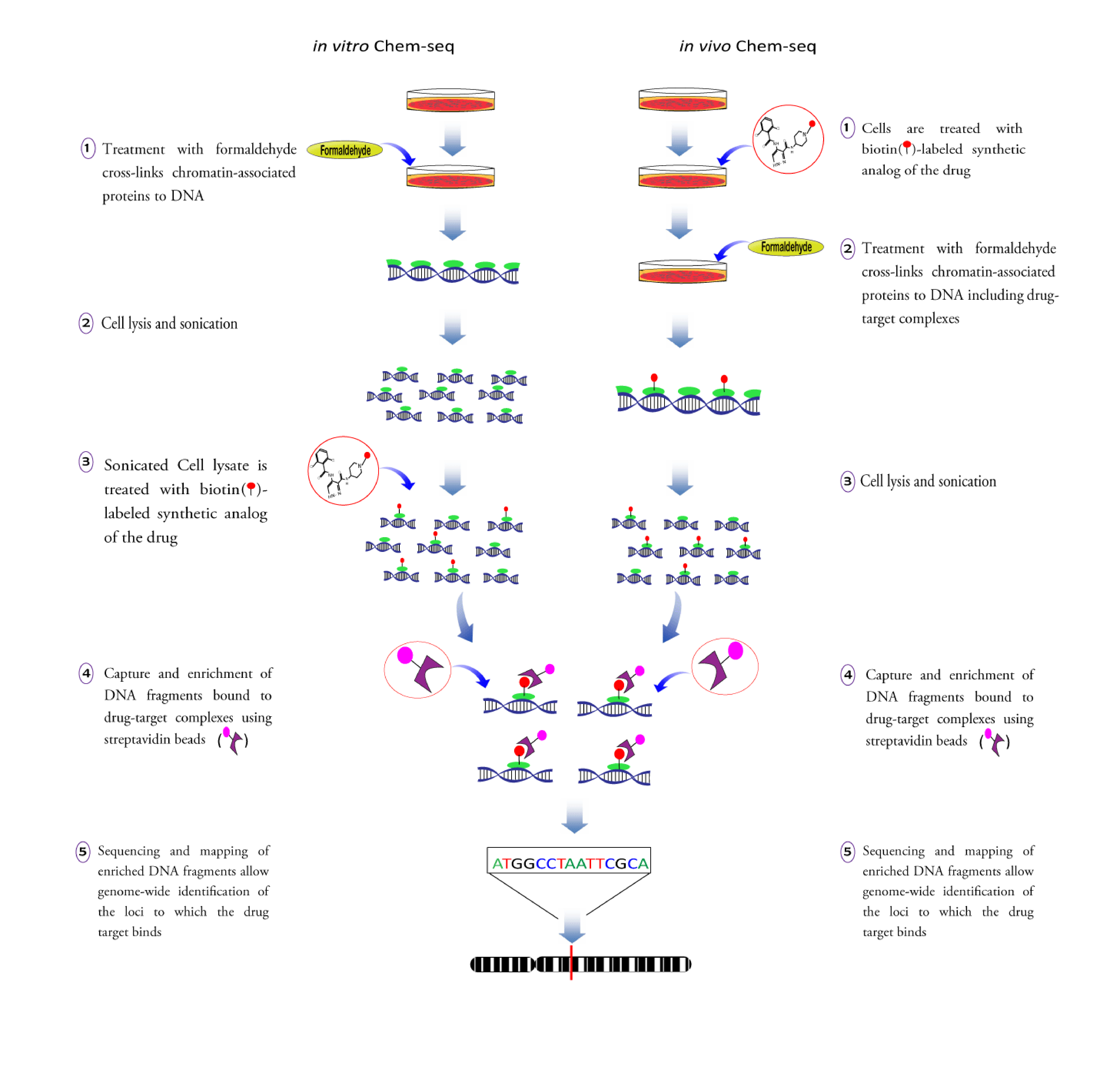
Chem-seq Workflow

Chem-seq relies on the ability to create a biotinylated version of a small molecule of interest to allow for downstream affinity capture. Chem-seq can be carried out either In vitro or In vivo, although the results from each have proven to be highly similar.

In vivo Chem-seq

During In vivo Chem-seq, cultured cells in medium are treated simultaneously with either a biotinylated version of the small molecule under study or DMSO (as a control) and 1% formaldehyde for the crosslinking of DNA, proteins and small molecules. DNA is then extracted from the cells, sonicated and enriched for regions containing the biotinylated molecule of interest by incubation with streptavidin magnetic beads, which have a very high affinity for biotin. The enriched DNA fraction is then purified, eluted from the beads and subjected to next generation sequencing. Genomic regions enriched in the Chem-seq library relative to the control are associated with the small molecule under study.

In vitro Chem-seq

In vitro Chem-seq begins with the crosslinking of cultured cells in medium with 0.5% formaldehyde. Cell nuclei are then harvested from the cells and their DNA is extracted. This extract is sonicated before being incubated with streptavidin magnetic beads that are bound to a biotinylated form of our compound of interest. This provides an opportunity for the small molecule of interest to interact with its target genomic regions. These genomic regions are then isolated using a magnet and subjected to next generation sequencing and analysis to determine regions enriched for our small molecule of interest.

== Sensitivity ==
Chem-seq was tested on three classes of drugs using MM1.S multiple myeloma cells to:

1) Investigate the genome-wide binding of the bromodomain inhibitor JQ1 to the BET bromodomain family members BRD2, BRD3 and BRD4

2) Map the genomic binding sites of AT7519, an inhibitor of the cyclin dependent kinase CDK9, and

3) Study how the DNA intercalating agent psoralen interacts with genomic DNA in vivo.

In the first two trials, Chem-seq signals occurred at genomic sites occupied by the drugs' corresponding target proteins and were concordant with ChIP-seq results. However, bio-AT7519 produced weaker Chem-seq signals compared to those observed for bio-JQ1. There was also a substantial number of loci that were not co-occupied by bio-AT7519 and its target CDK9 which might be attributed to the weaker signal obtained for bio-AT7519 or because AT7519 can bind and inhibit other cyclin-dependent kinase like cdks 1, 2, 4, 5. In a third experiment, Chem-seq was efficient in mapping genomic binding sites of the DNA intercalating agent psoralen and showed that bio-psoralen preferentially binds to the transcription start site of active genes.

== Advantages and Limitations ==
Advantages

Chem-seq is the first method that provides researchers with a way of determining the location of small molecules throughout the genome. It can be used in conjunction with ChIP-seq to cross reference the location of certain drugs with DNA binding proteins, like transcription factors, to discover novel interactions and aid in characterizing the molecular mechanisms through which small molecules affect the genome.

Because it uses next generation sequencing to determine small molecule binding sites, Chem-seq has a very high sensitivity and is compatible with other next generation sequencing based methods.

Previously, another similar technique known as chromatin affinity-precipitation (ChAP) assay was used to map the sites of interaction of metabolic compounds in the yeast genome, but Chem-seq is the first method to assess the genome-wide localization of small molecules in mammalian cells.

Limitations

For Chem-seq to be feasible, the small molecule under study must be amenable to biotinylation without disruption of its natural binding properties. This is simply not possible with certain small molecules and even when it is, the process can require expertise in organic chemistry. Once synthesized, the binding properties of the biotinylated compound must be tested. To date, this has been accomplished by comparing the binding kinetics of the biotinylated and unmodified compounds, a process that requires prior knowledge of the proteins that the compound binds.

The locations of Bio-JQ1 throughout the genome, as determined using Chem-seq, are almost identical to the ChIP-seq derived locations of the JQ1’s known target protein, BRD4. Although this may be viewed as a testament to the accuracy of the method it also highlights redundancies between the two techniques, especially when target proteins are previously known.
