= HEXIM1 =

Protein-coding gene in the species Homo sapiens

Available structures
PDB	Ortholog search: PDBe RCSB
PDB	List of PDB id codes 2GD7, 3S9G

Identifiers
- Aliases: HEXIM1, CLP1, EDG1, HIS1, MAQ1, hexamethylene bis-acetamide inducible 1, hexamethylene bisacetamide inducible 1, HEXIM P-TEFb complex subunit 1
- External IDs: OMIM: 607328; MGI: 2385923; HomoloGene: 31382; GeneCards: HEXIM1; OMA:HEXIM1 - orthologs

Gene location (Human)
Chr.	Chromosome 17 (human)
Band	17q21.31	Start	45,148,475 bp
Band	17q21.31	End	45,152,099 bp

Gene location (Mouse)
Chr.	Chromosome 11 (mouse)
Band	11|11 E1	Start	103,007,057 bp
Band	11|11 E1	End	103,010,551 bp
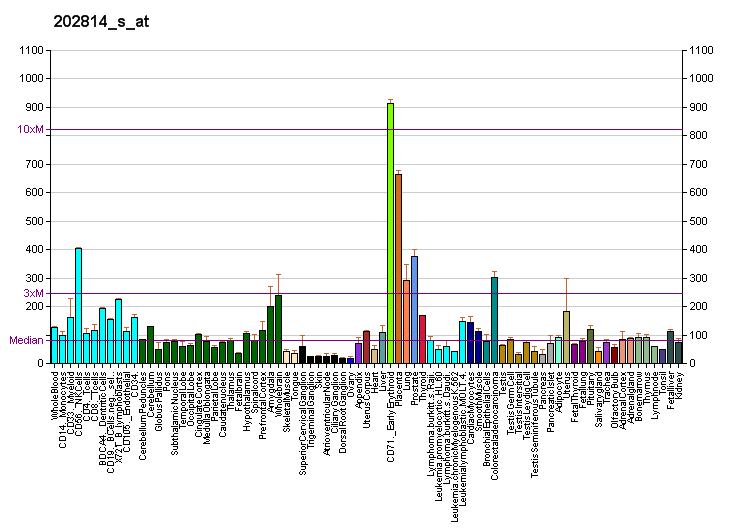

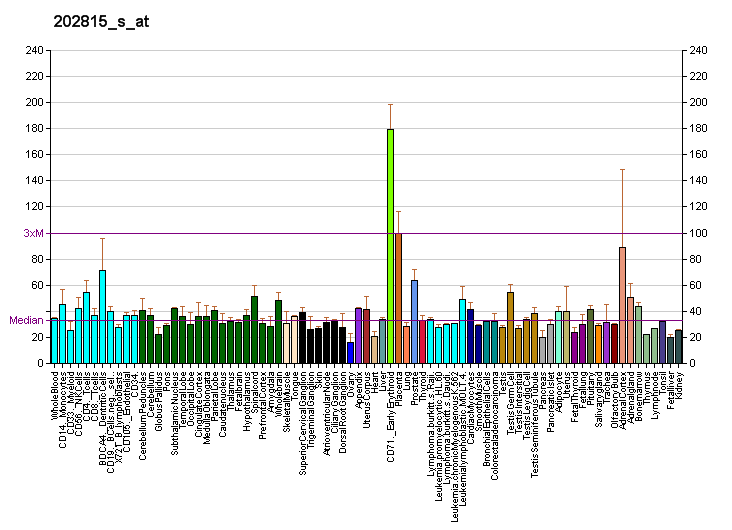
RNA expression pattern
Bgee	Human / Mouse (ortholog); Top expressed in: granulocyte; middle temporal gyrus; gingival epithelium; germinal epithelium; kidney tubule; glomerulus; Brodmann area 23; placenta; metanephric glomerulus; amniotic fluid / Top expressed in: gastrula; median eminence; adrenal gland; transitional epithelium of urinary bladder; lateral geniculate nucleus; ascending aorta; granulocyte; medial geniculate nucleus; ciliary body; central gray substance of midbrain; More reference expression data
BioGPS	More reference expression data
Gene ontology
Molecular function	protein binding; snRNA binding; 7SK snRNA binding; cyclin-dependent protein serine/threonine kinase inhibitor activity
Cellular component	nucleoplasm; cytoplasm; nucleus
Biological process	positive regulation of signal transduction by p53 class mediator; heart development; regulation of transcription, DNA-templated; transcription, DNA-templated; negative regulation of cyclin-dependent protein serine/threonine kinase activity; negative regulation of transcription, DNA-templated; negative regulation of transcription by RNA polymerase II; activation of innate immune response; immune system process; innate immune response
Sources:Amigo / QuickGO
Orthologs
Species	Human	Mouse
Entrez	10614	192231
Ensembl	ENSG00000186834	ENSMUSG00000048878
UniProt	O94992	Q8R409
RefSeq (mRNA)	NM_006460	NM_138753
RefSeq (protein)	NP_006451	NP_620092
Location (UCSC)	Chr 17: 45.15 – 45.15 Mb	Chr 11: 103.01 – 103.01 Mb
PubMed search
- Wikidata
View/Edit Human	View/Edit Mouse

Protein HEXIM1 is a protein that in humans is encoded by the HEXIM1 gene.

== Interactions ==
HEXIM1 has been shown to interact with Cyclin T1 and Cdk9 at 7SK RNA.

== See also ==
- HEXIM2
