= Cyclin T1 =

Protein-coding gene in humans

CCNT1
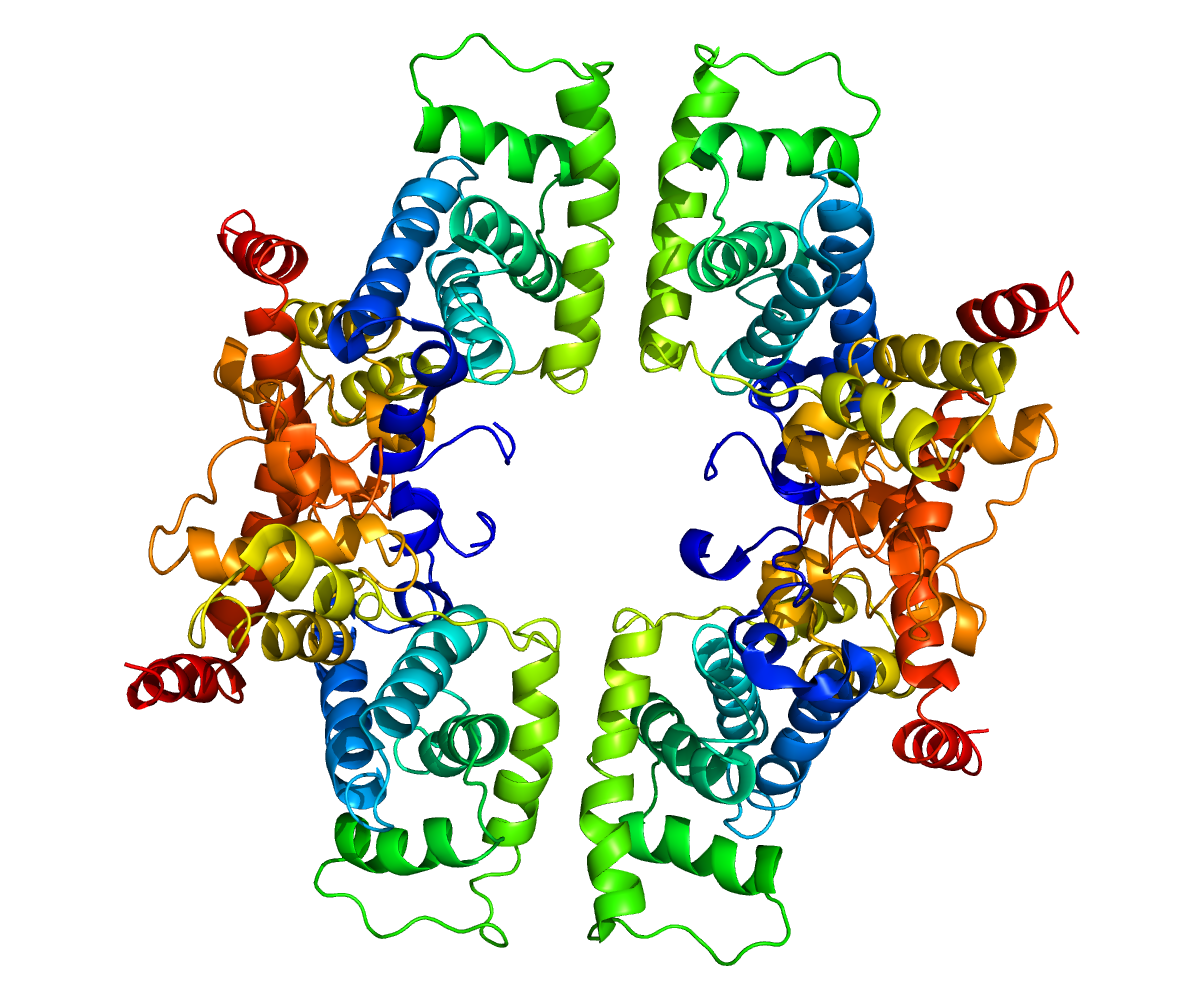

Identifiers
- Aliases: CCNT1, CCNT, CYCT1, HIVE1, cyclin T1
- External IDs: OMIM: 143055; MGI: 1328363; GeneCards: CCNT1
Available structures
PDB	Ortholog search: PDBe RCSB
PDB	List of PDB id codes 2PK2, 3BLH, 3BLQ, 3BLR, 3LQ5, 3MI9, 3MIA, 3MY1, 3TN8, 3TNH, 3TNI, 4BCF, 4BCG, 4BCH, 4BCI, 4BCJ, 4EC8, 4EC9, 4IMY, 4OGR, 4OR5

Gene location (Human)
Chr.	Chromosome 12 (human)
Band	12q13.11-q13.12	Start	48,688,458 bp
Band	12q13.11-q13.12	End	48,716,998 bp

Gene location (Mouse)
Chr.	Chromosome 15 (mouse)
Band	15|15 F1	Start	98,436,570 bp
Band	15|15 F1	End	98,468,804 bp
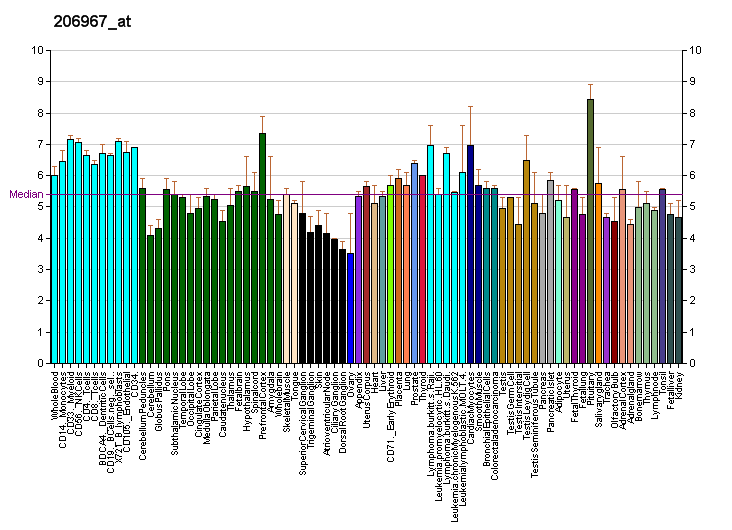
RNA expression pattern
Bgee	Human / Mouse (ortholog); Top expressed in: sperm; superior surface of tongue; renal medulla; pylorus; tail of epididymis; lactiferous duct; caput epididymis; nipple; mucosa of paranasal sinus; pericardium / Top expressed in: Rostral migratory stream; genital tubercle; conjunctival fornix; morula; neural layer of retina; ganglionic eminence; granulocyte; zygote; lacrimal gland; embryo; More reference expression data
BioGPS	More reference expression data
Gene ontology
Molecular function	DNA binding; snRNA binding; chromatin binding; 7SK snRNA binding; cyclin-dependent protein serine/threonine kinase regulator activity; protein binding; RNA polymerase binding; transcription factor binding; protein serine/threonine kinase activity; protein kinase binding; cyclin-dependent protein serine/threonine kinase activator activity
Cellular component	nucleoplasm; nucleolus; cyclin/CDK positive transcription elongation factor complex; nucleus; cyclin-dependent protein kinase holoenzyme complex
Biological process	regulation of cyclin-dependent protein serine/threonine kinase activity; negative regulation of mRNA polyadenylation; regulation of transcription, DNA-templated; transcription elongation from RNA polymerase II promoter; transcription by RNA polymerase II; cell division; protein phosphorylation; positive regulation of phosphorylation of RNA polymerase II C-terminal domain; positive regulation of cyclin-dependent protein serine/threonine kinase activity; positive regulation of viral transcription; cell cycle; positive regulation of transcription by RNA polymerase II; viral process; transcription, DNA-templated; snRNA transcription by RNA polymerase II; regulation of transcription by RNA polymerase II; positive regulation of DNA-templated transcription, elongation
Sources:Amigo / QuickGO
Orthologs
Databases	NCBI: entry; OMA: entry
Species	Human	Mouse
Entrez	904	12455
Ensembl	ENSG00000129315	ENSMUSG00000011960
UniProt	O60563	Q9QWV9
RefSeq (mRNA)	NM_001240; NM_001277842	NM_009833; NM_001368702
RefSeq (protein)	NP_001231; NP_001264771	NP_033963; NP_001355631
Location (UCSC)	Chr 12: 48.69 – 48.72 Mb	Chr 15: 98.44 – 98.47 Mb
PubMed search
- Wikidata
View/Edit Human	View/Edit Mouse

Cyclin-T1 is a protein that in humans is encoded by the CCNT1 gene.

== Function ==
The protein encoded by this gene belongs to the highly conserved cyclin family, whose members are characterized by a dramatic periodicity in protein abundance through the cell cycle. Cyclins function as regulators of CDK kinases. Different cyclins exhibit distinct expression and degradation patterns that contribute to the temporal coordination of each mitotic event. This cyclin tightly associates with CDK9 kinase, and was found to be a major subunit of the transcription elongation factor p-TEFb. The kinase complex containing this cyclin and the elongation factor can interact with, and act as a cofactor of human immunodeficiency virus type 1 (HIV-1) Tat protein, and was shown to be both necessary and sufficient for full activation of viral transcription. This cyclin and its kinase partner were also found to be involved in the phosphorylation and regulation of the carboxy-terminal domain (CTD) of the largest RNA polymerase II subunit.

== Interactions ==
Cyclin T1 has been shown to interact with the following:

- Aryl hydrocarbon receptor
- CDK9
- Granulin
- HEXIM1
- Myc
- NUFIP1
- Promyelocytic leukemia protein

== See also ==
- Cyclin T2
