= HEXIM2 =

Protein-coding gene in the species Homo sapiens

Identifiers
- Aliases: HEXIM2, L3, hexamethylene bisacetamide inducible 2, HEXIM P-TEFb complex subunit 2
- External IDs: OMIM: 615695; MGI: 1918309; HomoloGene: 16946; GeneCards: HEXIM2; OMA:HEXIM2 - orthologs

Gene location (Human)
Chr.	Chromosome 17 (human)
Band	17q21.31	Start	45,160,700 bp
Band	17q21.31	End	45,170,040 bp

Gene location (Mouse)
Chr.	Chromosome 11 (mouse)
Band	11|11 E1	Start	103,023,255 bp
Band	11|11 E1	End	103,030,702 bp
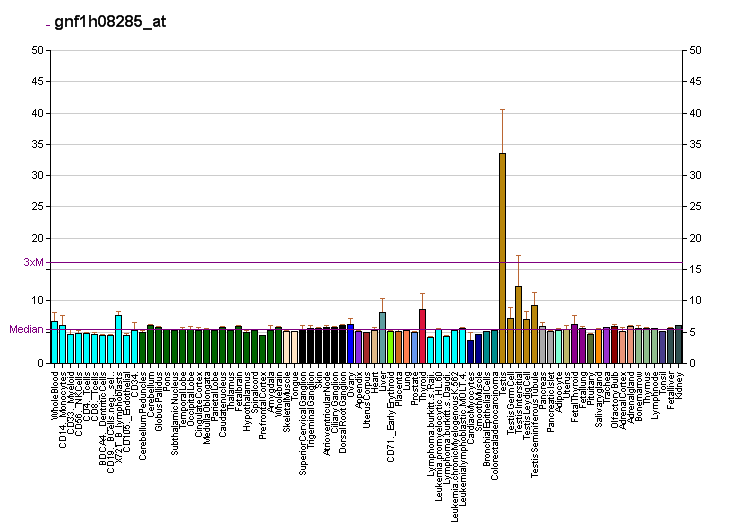
RNA expression pattern
Bgee	Human / Mouse (ortholog); Top expressed in: gastrocnemius muscle; left testis; right testis; testicle; muscle of thigh; gonad; pancreatic ductal cell; right uterine tube; sural nerve; apex of heart / Top expressed in: primary oocyte; zygote; spermatid; spermatocyte; secondary oocyte; neural layer of retina; Rostral migratory stream; substantia nigra; seminiferous tubule; trigeminal ganglion; More reference expression data
BioGPS	More reference expression data
Gene ontology
Molecular function	cyclin-dependent protein serine/threonine kinase inhibitor activity; snRNA binding; protein binding; 7SK snRNA binding; identical protein binding
Cellular component	nucleoplasm; cytoplasm; cytosol; nuclear speck; nucleus
Biological process	negative regulation of transcription, DNA-templated; regulation of transcription, DNA-templated; negative regulation of transcription by RNA polymerase II; transcription, DNA-templated; negative regulation of cyclin-dependent protein serine/threonine kinase activity; negative regulation of protein serine/threonine kinase activity
Sources:Amigo / QuickGO
Orthologs
Species	Human	Mouse
Entrez	124790	71059
Ensembl	ENSG00000168517	ENSMUSG00000043372
UniProt	Q96MH2	Q3TVI4
RefSeq (mRNA)	NM_001303436; NM_001303437; NM_001303438; NM_001303439; NM_001303440 NM_001303441; NM_001303442; NM_001303443; NM_001303444; NM_144608	NM_001130515; NM_001130516; NM_027658
RefSeq (protein)	NP_001290365; NP_001290366; NP_001290367; NP_001290368; NP_001290369 NP_001290370; NP_001290371; NP_001290372; NP_001290373; NP_653209	NP_001123987; NP_001123988; NP_081934
Location (UCSC)	Chr 17: 45.16 – 45.17 Mb	Chr 11: 103.02 – 103.03 Mb
PubMed search
- Wikidata
View/Edit Human	View/Edit Mouse

Protein HEXIM2 is a protein that in humans is encoded by the HEXIM2 gene.

== Interactions ==
HEXIM2 has been shown to interact with P-TEFb at 7SK RNA.

== See also ==
- HEXIM1
