= Enitociclib =

Chemical compound

Identifiers
- IUPAC name: 5-fluoro-4-(4-fluoro-2-methoxyphenyl)-N-[4-[(methylsulfonimidoyl)methyl]pyridin-2-yl]pyridin-2-amine
- CAS Number: 1610408-97-3
- PubChem CID: 139593425
- IUPHAR/BPS: 11686
- DrugBank: DB17297
- ChemSpider: 81367557
- UNII: 1255AT22ZJ
- ChEBI: CHEBI:231682
- ChEMBL: ChEMBL4762845

Chemical and physical data
- Formula: C_{19}H_{18}F_{2}N_{4}O_{2}S
- Molar mass: 404.44 g·mol^{−1}
- 3D model (JSmol): Interactive image
- SMILES: COC1=C(C=CC(=C1)F)C2=CC(=NC=C2F)NC3=NC=CC(=C3)C[S@@](=N)(=O)C
- InChI: InChI=nChI=1S/C19H18F2N4O2S/c1-27-17-8-13(20)3-4-14(17)15-9-19(24-10-16(15)21)25-18-7-12(5-6-23-18)11-28(2,22)26/h3-10,22H,11H2,1-2H3,(H,23,24,25)/t28-/m0/s1; Key:YZCUMZWULWOUMD-NDEPHWFRSA-N

Enitociclib is an experimental drug that is being investigated for the treatment of cancer. It is an inhibitor of the kinase CDK9.
