= NUFIP1 =

Protein-coding gene in the species Homo sapiens

Identifiers
- Aliases: NUFIP1, NUFIP, bA540M5.1, FMR1 interacting protein 1, nuclear FMR1 interacting protein 1, Rsa1
- External IDs: OMIM: 604354; MGI: 1351474; GeneCards: NUFIP1

Gene location (Human)
Chr.	Chromosome 13 (human)
Band	13q14.12	Start	44,939,249 bp
Band	13q14.12	End	44,989,471 bp

Gene location (Mouse)
Chr.	Chromosome 14 (mouse)
Band	14|14 D3	Start	76,348,331 bp
Band	14|14 D3	End	76,374,819 bp
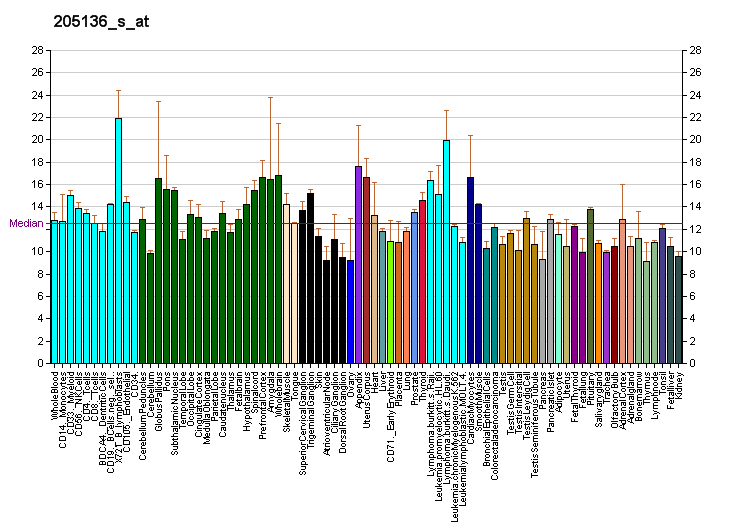

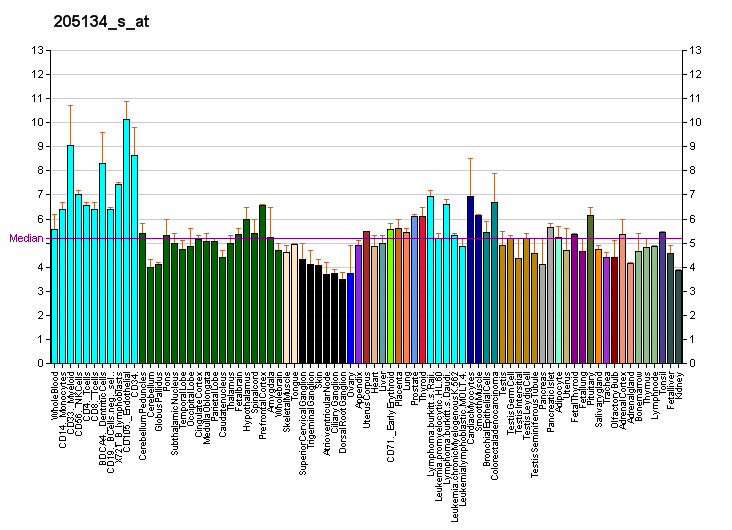

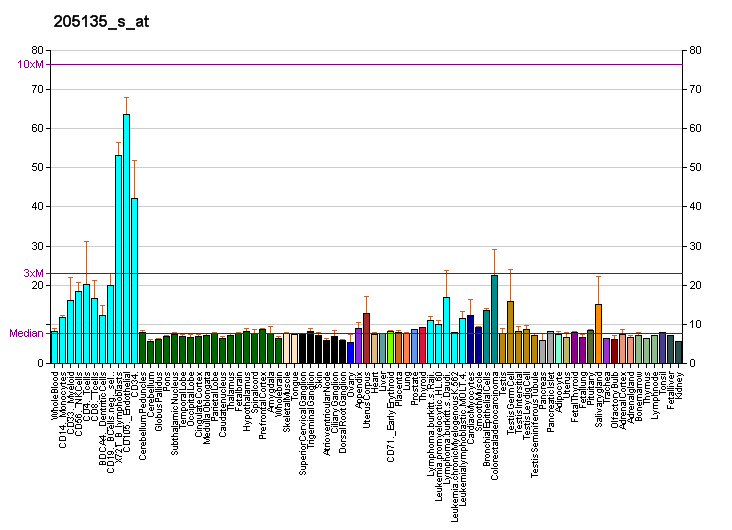
RNA expression pattern
Bgee	Human / Mouse (ortholog); Top expressed in: endothelial cell; gonad; secondary oocyte; ventricular zone; testicle; ganglionic eminence; Brodmann area 23; gastrocnemius muscle; Achilles tendon; islet of Langerhans / Top expressed in: primitive streak; epiblast; renal corpuscle; medullary collecting duct; external carotid artery; Gonadal ridge; internal carotid artery; Paneth cell; abdominal wall; endothelial cell of lymphatic vessel; More reference expression data
BioGPS	More reference expression data
Gene ontology
Molecular function	protein binding; ATPase binding; identical protein binding; protein-macromolecule adaptor activity; snoRNA binding; RNA binding; metal ion binding; DNA binding; nucleic acid binding
Cellular component	nuclear matrix; nucleus; pre-snoRNP complex; perichromatin fibrils; nucleolus; cytosolic ribosome; transcription elongation factor complex; fibrillar center; presynaptic active zone; protein-containing complex; synapse
Biological process	box C/D snoRNP assembly; positive regulation of transcription by RNA polymerase II; RNA processing; protein complex oligomerization
Sources:Amigo / QuickGO
Orthologs
Databases	NCBI: entry; OMA: entry
Species	Human	Mouse
Entrez	26747	27275
Ensembl	ENSG00000083635	ENSMUSG00000022009
UniProt	Q9UHK0	Q9QXX8
RefSeq (mRNA)	NM_012345	NM_013745
RefSeq (protein)	NP_036477	NP_038773
Location (UCSC)	Chr 13: 44.94 – 44.99 Mb	Chr 14: 76.35 – 76.37 Mb
PubMed search
- Wikidata
View/Edit Human	View/Edit Mouse

Nuclear fragile X mental retardation-interacting protein 1 is a protein that in humans is encoded by the NUFIP1 gene.

== Interactions ==
NUFIP1 has been shown to interact with:

- BRCA1,
- Cyclin T1, and
- FMR1.
