= Run-off transcription =

Technique in molecular biology

Run-off transcription is an in vitro technique used to make RNA molecules from a DNA template using purified RNA polymerase. The method is called “run-off” because transcription continues until the polymerase reaches the end of the DNA fragment, producing an RNA of a defined and predictable length. This assay is used to study promoter activity, to test how specific DNA sequence changes influence transcription initiation, and to generate precisely sized RNA products for downstream assays. Because the reaction occurs outside the cell, run-off transcription offers tight control over template and reaction conditions but does not fully replicate the complexity of in vivo gene regulation.

More specifically, run-off transcription is used to determine the exact transcription start site (located 1 base pair downstream of the promoter) and to assess the accuracy and rate of in vitro transcription. It can also be used to quantitatively measure how alterations in promoter sequences affect transcriptional output. However, due to its in vitro nature, the assay cannot accurately predict cell-type–specific transcription levels, in contrast to in vivo methods such as nuclear run-on assays.

== History and background ==
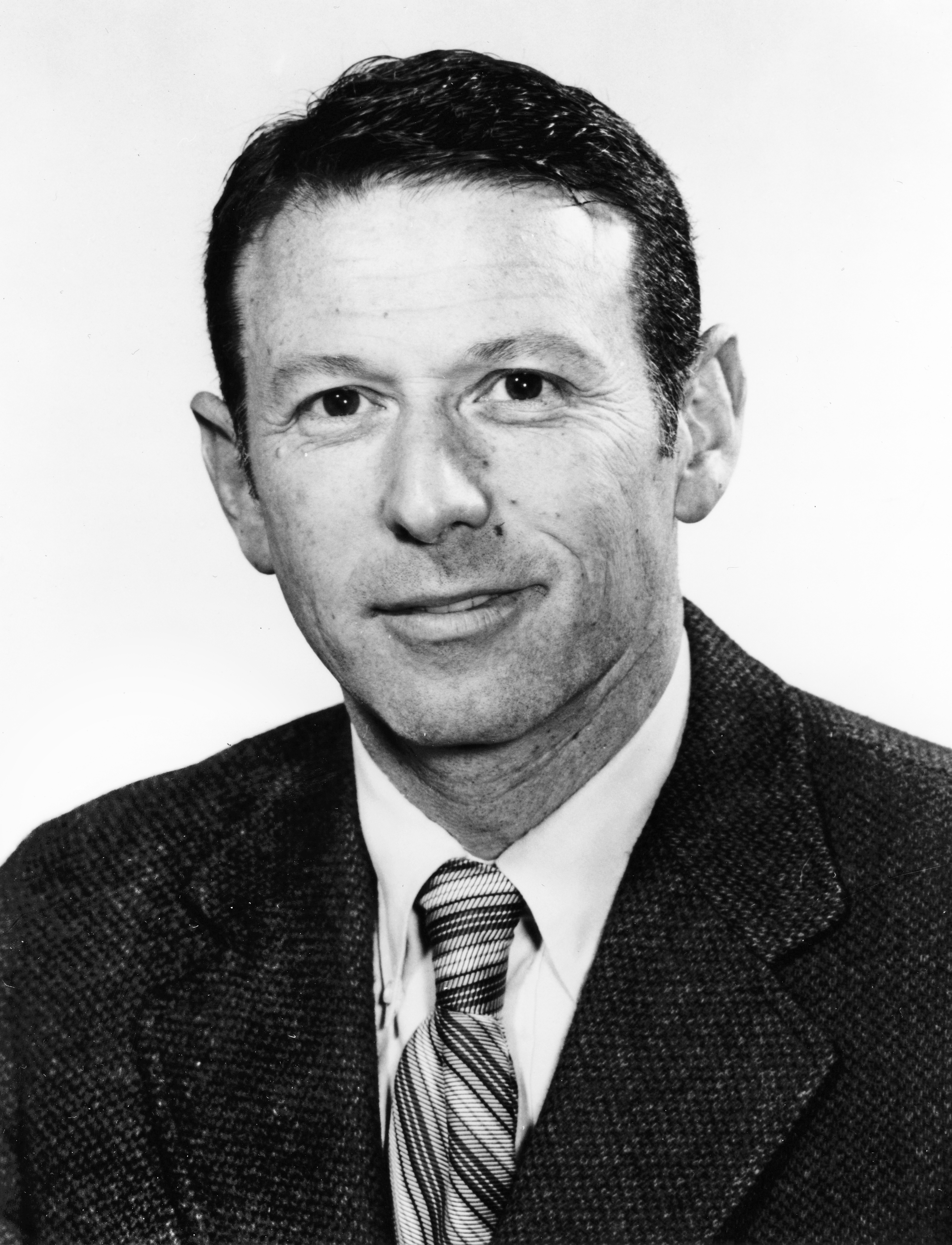
Paul Berg in 1980

Michael Chamberlin, who died in his sleep in November 2025, was the first person to isolate RNA polymerase from Escherichia coli as a graduate student at Stanford University with the late Paul Berg and revolutionized the understanding of transcription process.

== Principle ==
To perform a run-off transcription assay, a gene of interest, including the promoter, is cloned into a plasmid. The plasmid is digested at a known restriction enzyme cut site downstream from the transcription start site such that the expected mRNA run-off product would be easily separated by gel electrophoresis. DNA needs to be highly purified prior to running this assay. To initiate transcription, radiolabeled UTP, the other nucleotides, and RNA polymerase are added to the linearized DNA. Transcription continues until the RNA polymerase reaches the end of the DNA where it simply “runs off” the DNA template, resulting in an mRNA fragment of a defined length. This fragment can then be separated by gel electrophoresis, alongside size standards, and autoradiographed. The corresponding size of the band will represent the size of the mRNA from the restriction enzyme cut site to the transcription start site (+1). The intensity of the band will indicate the amount of mRNA produced. Additionally, it can be used to detect whether or not transcription is carried out under certain conditions (i.e. in the presence of different chemicals).

== Procedure ==
Preparing DNA template: DNA templates for transcription assay are either plasmids or dsDNA fragments constructed using synthesized oligonucleotides. The circular DNA template that contains the promoter sequence (T7 promoter) is linearized using Restriction endonuclease that cuts downstream of the region to be transcribed. It ensures the RNA polymerase will transcribe the DNA until it runs off the end of the linearized DNA molecule.

Assembly of the transcription assay: The linearized DNA molecule is mixed with Tris-HCl, MgCl_{2}, Spermidine, DTT and nucleotides (ATP, GTP,CTP, UTP). The reaction is incubated at 37°C for T7. Radiolabeled or fluorescently labeled nucleotides can be added too. For large scale assays, addition of Ribonuclease inhibitor and inorganic pyrophosphatases are recommended to improve the quality and yield of the transcripts. After transcription, excess DNA template could be removed by DNase treatment.

== Applications ==
- Directed evolution: Run-off transcription is a central method in directed evolution experiments that require the generation of large, diverse RNA libraries, such as ribozymes and aptamers. In these systems, pools of randomized or mutagenized DNA sequences are linearized and transcribed in vitro using T7 RNA polymerase to produce uniform RNA molecules whose 5′ and 3′ boundaries are precisely defined by the template. This template-controlled synthesis is essential for maintaining a consistent genotype–phenotype linkage during selection, since each variant must be expressed as a full-length RNA to fold and function properly. Tuerk and Gold’s original SELEX (Systematic Evolution of Ligands by Exponential enrichment) experiments used run-off transcription of randomized DNA libraries to generate RNA pools for iterative binding selections against T4 DNA polymerase, establishing the method as a foundation for aptamer evolution. Similarly, Bartel and Szostak applied run-off transcription to produce libraries exceeding 10¹⁵ unique RNA molecules in their isolation of new catalytic RNAs, demonstrating how efficient in vitro transcription enables high-complexity ribozyme selection. Follow-up selections by Lehman and Joyce also relied on run-off transcription to regenerate large RNA populations after each round of catalysis-based enrichment. Because every cycle of mutation, selection, and amplification requires regeneration of precisely defined RNA molecules, run-off transcription remains one of the fundamental preparative steps in RNA-based directed evolution.
- Run-off transcription microarray analysis (ROMA): Bacterial gene expression can be regulated in many levels including activating or repressing DNA-binding transcription factors at the transcription initiation site or the RNA polymerase containing different Sigma factors. Purified RNA polymerase holoenzyme is used on fragmented genomic DNA for in vitro transcription and mRNA transcripts are identified by Microarray hybridization analysis. Then ROMA allowed investigation of direct effects of different sigma factors like overlapping sigma 70 and sigma 38 without regulatory protein. ROMA is limited by lack of single nucleotide resolution and transcriptional read-through at convergently originated genes which can lead to false positive signals.
- Run-off transcription/RNA-Seq (ROSE): To overcome the limitations of ROMA, scientists developed ROSE, a bottom-up approach aimed to assemble the transcriptional machinery to complement top-down in vivo transcriptome profiling in E. coli K-12 MG1655 genomic DNA. It is a genome-wide in vitro transcription with isolated RNA polymerase, ribonucleotides and genomic DNA. A library of native 5'-end specific transcript is prepared to provide distinct read of the transcription start point. It enables the detection of promoter sequences with single nucleotide resolution.

== Limitations ==
- Limited processivity: Bacteriophage RNA polymerases such as T7, SP6, and T3 can dissociate from the DNA template before reaching the end of the linear fragment, producing truncated transcripts. This premature termination occurs more frequently on long templates or templates containing strong secondary structures that impede elongation. Milligan et al. demonstrated that T7 RNA polymerase shows a measurable decline in processivity on templates exceeding several hundred nucleotides, leading to shorter-than-expected run-off products under standard in vitro conditions.
- High salt sensitivity: Run-off transcription is highly sensitive to ionic strength, as monovalent salts (NaCl, KCl) inhibit the stability of the RNA polymerase–promoter complex and reduce elongation efficiency. High-salt conditions destabilize the open complex and slow the transition from initiation to productive elongation. Milligan et al. reported that increasing salt concentrations significantly reduce transcription efficiency of T7 RNA polymerase, indicating strong ionic dependence of promoter–polymerase interactions.
- Undesired products resulting from abortive synthesis: During early stages of transcription, RNA polymerases frequently produce short abortive transcripts (2–10 nucleotide) before transitioning into processive elongation. These short RNAs accumulate in run-off transcription reactions and can complicate quantification of full-length products. McAllister and colleagues showed that abortive cycling is an inherent feature of T7 RNA polymerase initiation, particularly when promoter spacing or initiating NTP concentrations are suboptimal.
- Addition of a non-base-paired nucleotide at the 3' end of the run-off transcript: T7 and SP6 RNA polymerases can add one or more non-templated nucleotides to the 3′ end of the nascent RNA, even when the DNA template terminates cleanly at a restriction site. This 3′ heterogeneity arises from template-independent terminal transferase activity of the polymerase. Pleiss et al. demonstrated consistent 3′-end nucleotide additions in T7 run-off transcripts, while Helm and Brulé similarly reported non-templated nucleotide incorporation during SP6 and T7 in vitro transcription reactions.

== Recent advancements ==
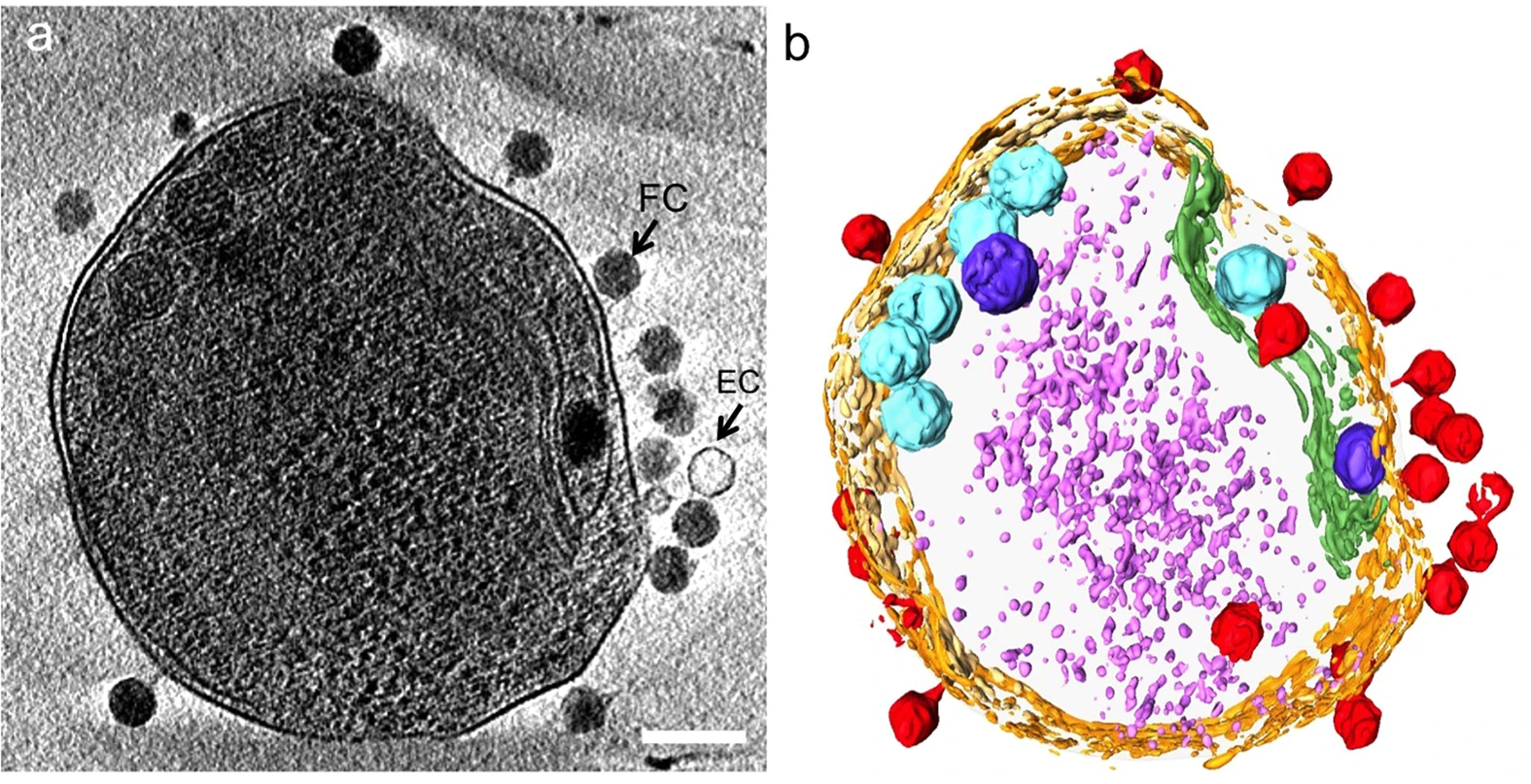
Figure: Adsorption of a cyanophage onto a marine prochlorococcus.

To overcome the limitations of using T7 RNA polymerase, bacteriophage T3 and SP6 RNA Polymerase, scientists made extensive efforts to improve the 3' homogeneity of T7 transcripts including the modifications of DNA template, and the attachment of ribozymes to the 3' end of the desired RNAs. A marine organism named Cyanophage Syn5, a single subunit RNA polymerase was characterized for this purpose. Syn5 RNA polymerase can recognize a relatively short promoter sequence, a high tolerance to salt, high processivity because of two promoter sequences in its genome and most importantly, it has much higher homogeneity of the 3'-termini of its RNA products. It can produce precise run-off transcripts lacking non-based additional nucleotides which is crucial for in vitro synthesis of tRNAs, RNA probes, and RNA primers. Syn5 RNA polymerase exhibits greater stability than T7 RNA polymerase over 4 hours of incubation at 37°C.
