= Cyclin K =

Protein-coding gene in the species Homo sapiens

CCNK
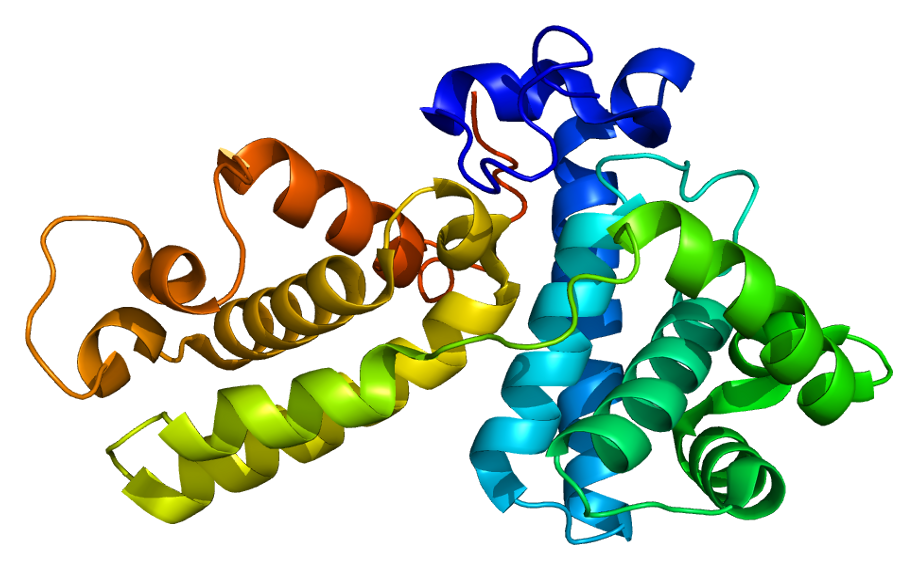

Identifiers
- Aliases: CCNK, CPR4, Cyclin K, IDDHDF
- External IDs: OMIM: 603544; MGI: 1276106; GeneCards: CCNK
Available structures
| PDB | Ortholog search: PDBe RCSB |
| PDB | List of PDB id codes 2I53, 4CXA, 4NST, 4UN0, 5EFQ, 5ACB |

Gene location (Human)
| Chr. | Chromosome 14 (human) |
| Band | 14q32.2 | Start | 99,481,169 bp |
| Band | 14q32.2 | End | 99,535,044 bp |

Gene location (Mouse)
| Chr. | Chromosome 12 (mouse) |
| Band | 12 F1|12 59.23 cM | Start | 108,145,838 bp |
| Band | 12 F1|12 59.23 cM | End | 108,169,618 bp |
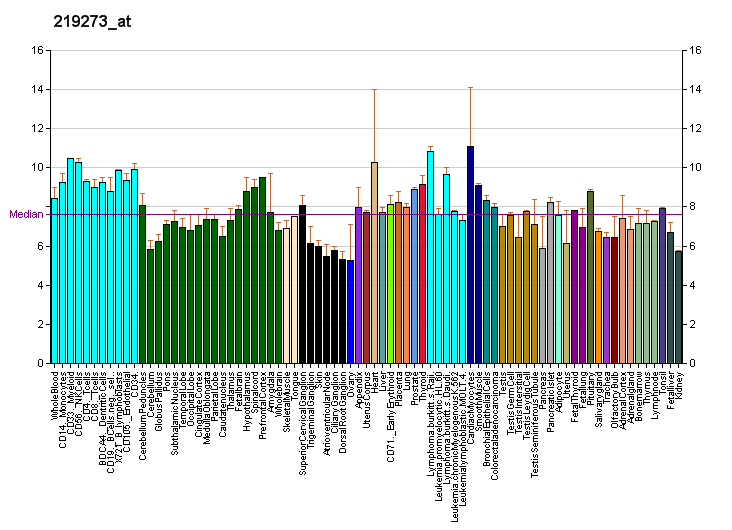
RNA expression pattern
| Bgee | Human / Mouse (ortholog); Top expressed in: skin of arm; cardiac muscle tissue of right atrium; myocardium of left ventricle; mucosa of ileum; amniotic fluid; monocyte; tibialis anterior muscle; parotid gland; pancreatic ductal cell; bone marrow cell / Top expressed in: zygote; muscle of thigh; tail of embryo; genital tubercle; interventricular septum; seminiferous tubule; ventricular zone; spermatid; spermatocyte; neural layer of retina; More reference expression data |
| BioGPS | More reference expression data |
Gene ontology
| Molecular function | protein binding; protein kinase binding; RNA polymerase II CTD heptapeptide repeat kinase activity; cyclin-dependent protein serine/threonine kinase activity; cyclin-dependent protein serine/threonine kinase regulator activity; protein serine/threonine kinase activity; cyclin-dependent protein serine/threonine kinase activator activity |
| Cellular component | cyclin K-CDK12 complex; nucleus; cyclin K-CDK13 complex; nucleoplasm; cyclin-dependent protein kinase holoenzyme complex; cyclin/CDK positive transcription elongation factor complex |
| Biological process | positive regulation of cyclin-dependent protein serine/threonine kinase activity; transcription elongation from RNA polymerase II promoter; regulation of cyclin-dependent protein serine/threonine kinase activity; positive regulation of phosphorylation of RNA polymerase II C-terminal domain serine 2 residues; regulation of transcription, DNA-templated; cellular response to DNA damage stimulus; transcription by RNA polymerase II; negative regulation by host of viral genome replication; positive regulation of transcription by RNA polymerase II; cell division; cell cycle; protein phosphorylation; transcription, DNA-templated; snRNA transcription by RNA polymerase II; positive regulation of phosphorylation of RNA polymerase II C-terminal domain; regulation of transcription by RNA polymerase II; positive regulation of DNA-templated transcription, elongation |
Sources:Amigo / QuickGO
Orthologs
| Databases | NCBI: entry; OMA: entry |
| Species | Human | Mouse |
| Entrez | 8812 | 12454 |
| Ensembl | ENSG00000090061 | ENSMUSG00000021258 |
| UniProt | O75909 | O88874; Q3U3M5 |
| RefSeq (mRNA) | NM_001099402; NM_003858 | NM_009832 |
| RefSeq (protein) | NP_001092872 | NP_033962 |
| Location (UCSC) | Chr 14: 99.48 – 99.54 Mb | Chr 12: 108.15 – 108.17 Mb |
| PubMed search |
- Wikidata
| View/Edit Human | View/Edit Mouse |

Cyclin-K is a protein that in humans is encoded by the CCNK gene.

== Function ==
The protein encoded by this gene is a member of the transcription cyclin family. These cyclins may regulate transcription through their association with and activation of cyclin-dependent kinases (CDKs) through conformational changes. Activation of CDKs through their cyclin partner, creates kinase complexes that will activate target proteins through phosphorylation. Targeted proteins can then ultimately regulate decisions of a cell's progression within the cell cycle to occur. This gene product may be seen to play a dual role in both regulating CDK and RNA polymerase II (RNAP2) activities. Cyclin K only uses RNA recruitment to activate transcription.

== Interactions ==
Cyclin K has been shown to interact with multiple CDKs including CDK9 and latest CDK12 and CDK13. Roles include helping to phosphorylate C-terminal domains of subunits of RNAP2. Cyclin K is most noted for its associated induction of processive elongation. Also, identified with G1 and S phase cyclin activity, however functions are not deeply understood.

Cyclin K also interacts with HIV nef protein. In the presence of overexpressed Nef protein, Cyclin k and CDK9 binding is induced, inhibiting the positive elongation factor of other CDK9 binding complexes, resulting in an inhibition of specific HIV-1 gene expression. CDK 13 may also be characterized to interact with HIV mRNA splicing, alongside Nef, and the underexpression of Gag and Env related proteins.

Cyclin K is indispensable for Leukemia growth. SETD1A, is also known to bind Cyclin K through its FLOS domain. The interaction is shown to be important to DNA damage response genes and for Leukemia proliferation.
