= Cyclin T2 =

Protein-coding gene in the species Homo sapiens

CCNT2
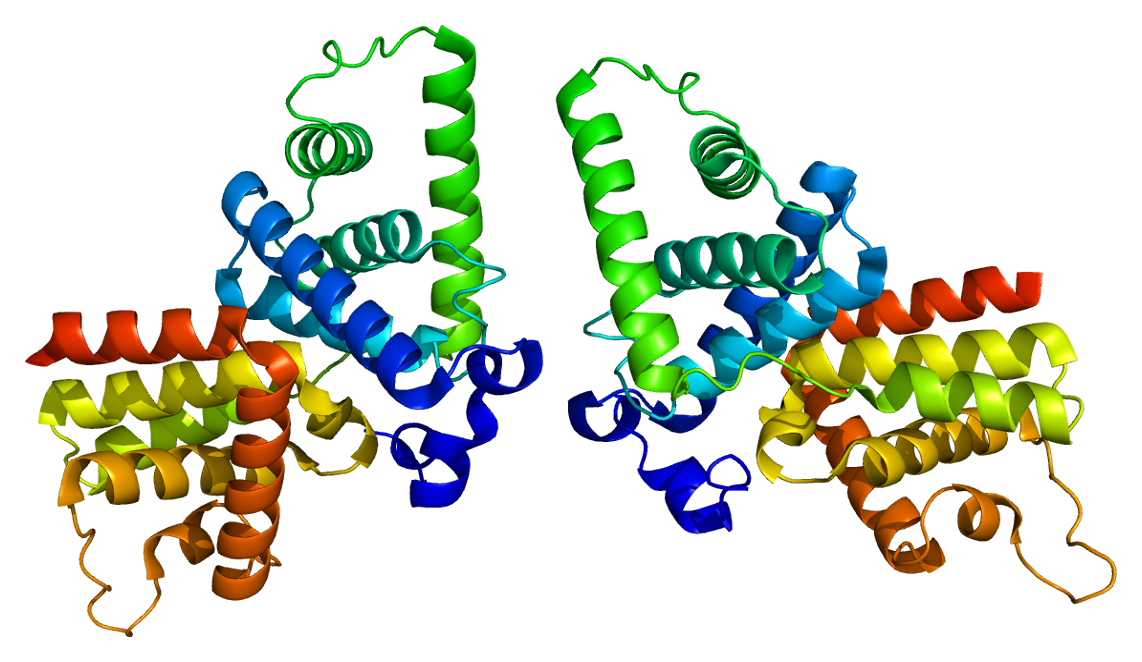

Identifiers
- Aliases: CCNT2, CYCT2, cyclin T2
- External IDs: OMIM: 603862; MGI: 1920199; GeneCards: CCNT2
Available structures
PDB	Ortholog search: PDBe RCSB
PDB	List of PDB id codes 2IVX

Gene location (Human)
Chr.	Chromosome 2 (human)
Band	2q21.3	Start	134,918,235 bp
Band	2q21.3	End	134,959,342 bp

Gene location (Mouse)
Chr.	Chromosome 1 (mouse)
Band	1|1 E3	Start	127,701,901 bp
Band	1|1 E3	End	127,735,798 bp
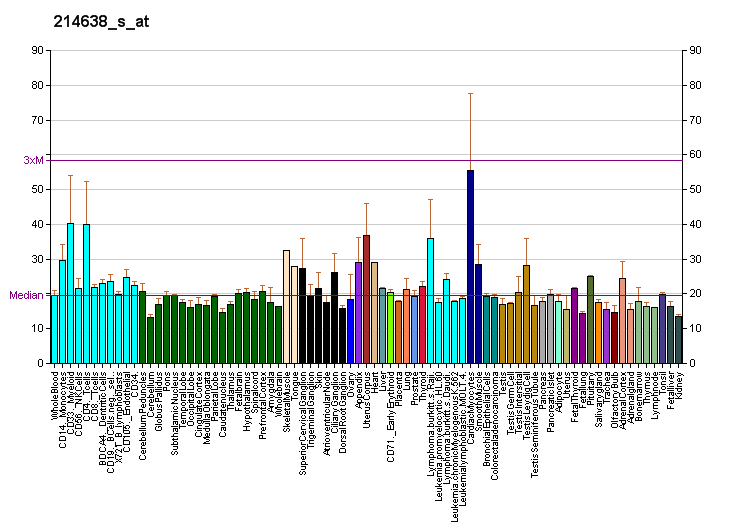

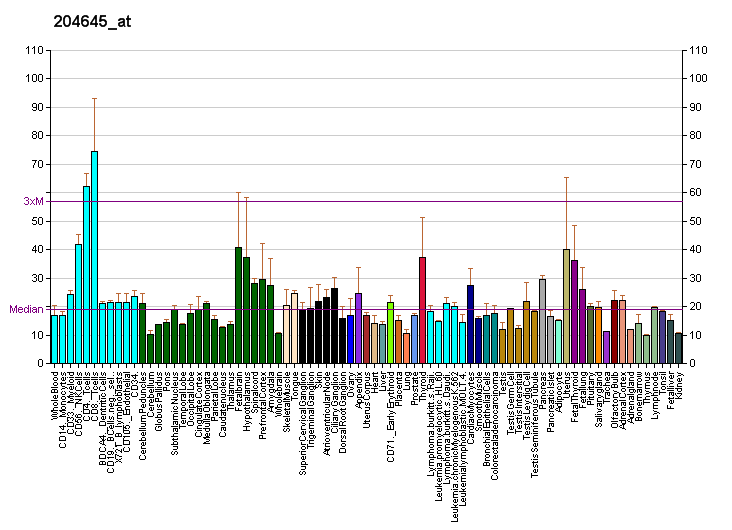
RNA expression pattern
Bgee	Human / Mouse (ortholog); Top expressed in: Achilles tendon; body of pancreas; visceral pleura; endothelial cell; testicle; monocyte; Brodmann area 23; rectum; germinal epithelium; endometrium / Top expressed in: medullary collecting duct; Rostral migratory stream; renal corpuscle; substantia nigra; aortic valve; zygote; secondary oocyte; ascending aorta; retinal pigment epithelium; mammillary body; More reference expression data
BioGPS	More reference expression data
Gene ontology
Molecular function	protein kinase binding; 7SK snRNA binding; transcription coactivator binding; cyclin-dependent protein serine/threonine kinase regulator activity; RNA polymerase binding; protein binding; protein serine/threonine kinase activity; chromatin binding; cyclin-dependent protein serine/threonine kinase activator activity
Cellular component	cyclin/CDK positive transcription elongation factor complex; nucleus; perinuclear region of cytoplasm; cytoplasm; nucleoplasm; cytosol; plasma membrane; cyclin-dependent protein kinase holoenzyme complex
Biological process	regulation of muscle cell differentiation; early viral transcription; positive regulation of phosphorylation of RNA polymerase II C-terminal domain; cell cycle; late viral transcription; cell division; regulation of cyclin-dependent protein serine/threonine kinase activity; positive regulation of cyclin-dependent protein serine/threonine kinase activity; transcription elongation from RNA polymerase II promoter; regulation of transcription, DNA-templated; transcription by RNA polymerase II; positive regulation of transcription by RNA polymerase II; viral process; transcription, DNA-templated; snRNA transcription by RNA polymerase II; protein phosphorylation; skeletal muscle tissue development; regulation of transcription by RNA polymerase II; positive regulation of DNA-templated transcription, elongation
Sources:Amigo / QuickGO
Orthologs
Databases	NCBI: entry; OMA: entry
Species	Human	Mouse
Entrez	905	72949
Ensembl	ENSG00000082258	ENSMUSG00000026349
UniProt	O60583	Q7TQK0
RefSeq (mRNA)	NM_001241; NM_058241; NM_001320748; NM_001320749	NM_028399
RefSeq (protein)	NP_001232; NP_001307677; NP_001307678; NP_490595	NP_082675
Location (UCSC)	Chr 2: 134.92 – 134.96 Mb	Chr 1: 127.7 – 127.74 Mb
PubMed search
- Wikidata
View/Edit Human	View/Edit Mouse

Cyclin-T2 is a protein that in humans is encoded by the CCNT2 gene.

== Function ==
The protein encoded by this gene belongs to the highly conserved cyclin family, whose members are characterized by a dramatic periodicity in protein abundance through the cell cycle. Cyclins function as regulators of CDK kinases. Different cyclins exhibit distinct expression and degradation patterns which contribute to the temporal coordination of each mitotic event. This cyclin and its kinase partner CDK9 were found to be subunits of the transcription elongation factor p-TEFb. The p-TEFb complex containing this cyclin was reported to interact with, and act as a negative regulator of human immunodeficiency virus type 1 (HIV-1) Tat protein. Two alternatively spliced transcript variants, which encode distinct isoforms, have been described.

== Interactions ==
Cyclin T2 has been shown to interact with CDK9 and Retinoblastoma protein.

== See also ==
- Cyclin T1
