= Affinity capture =

Affinity capture is a technique in molecular biology used to isolate desired compounds based on their chemical properties and a solid substrate. Commonly, plates out of solid materials such as glass are coated with various reagents to allow for covalent bonding of a capturing molecule such as an antibody. Afterwards, a solvent containing a desired compound for isolation is poured onto the plate, and the compound binds to the receptors on the plate (hence the capturing of the compound). Washing the plate and removing the desired compound completes the purification process.

== Applications ==
Affinity capture has been used to isolate proteins by means of binding a peptide sequence to the solid substrate, thus allowing for protein capture. The process has also been examined for potential automation, but the unique circumstances for any given experiment may impede reproducibility.

== See also ==
- Chem-seq
