= Cyclin-dependent kinase 9 =

Protein-coding gene in the species Homo sapiens

CDK9
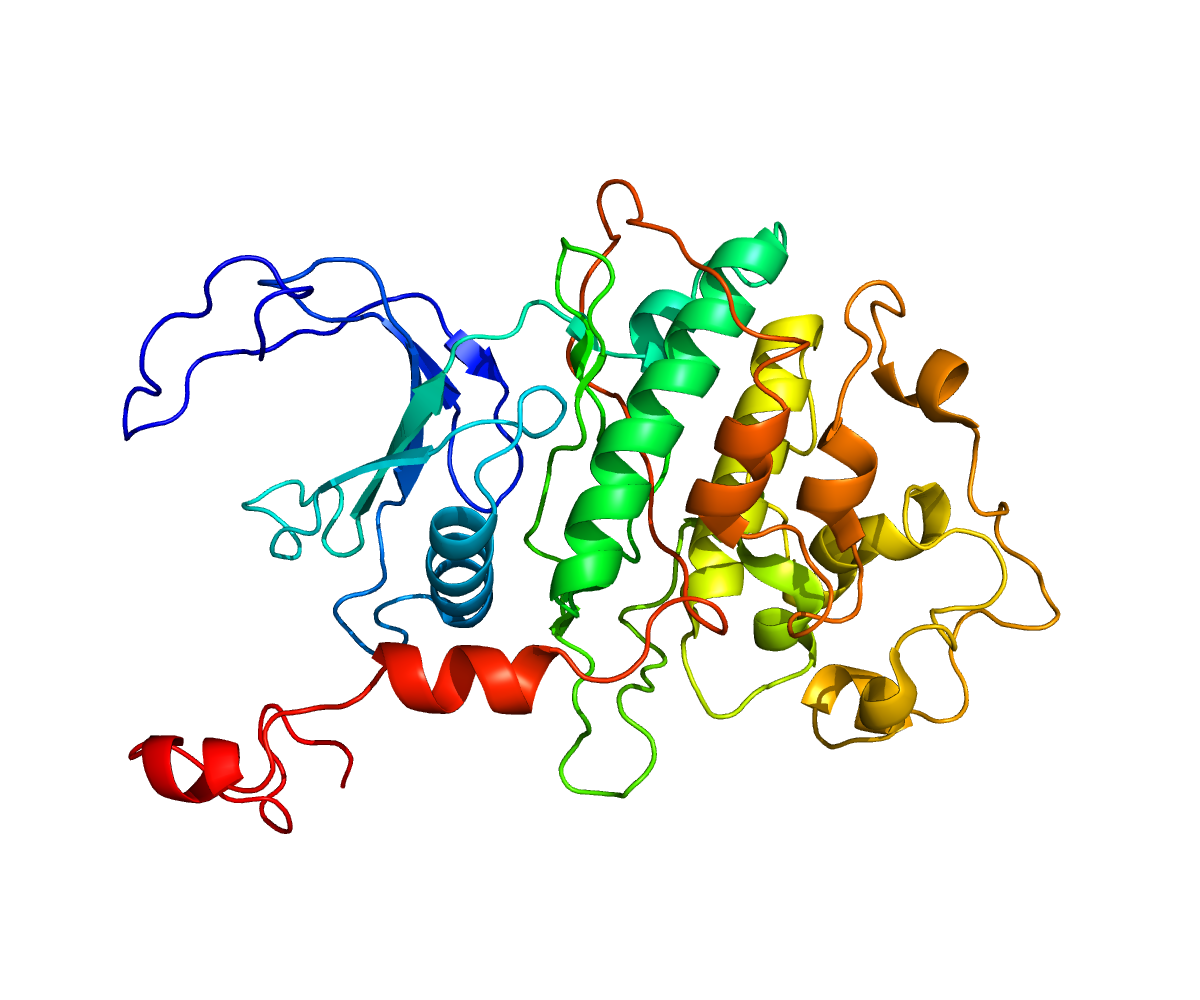

Identifiers
- Aliases: CDK9, C-2k, CDC2L4, CTK1, PITALRE, TAK, cyclin-dependent kinase 9, cyclin dependent kinase 9
- External IDs: OMIM: 603251; MGI: 1328368; GeneCards: CDK9
Available structures
PDB	Ortholog search: PDBe RCSB
PDB	List of PDB id codes 3BLH, 3BLQ, 3BLR, 3LQ5, 3MI9, 3MIA, 3MY1, 3TN8, 3TNH, 3TNI, 4BCF, 4BCG, 4BCH, 4BCI, 4BCJ, 4EC8, 4EC9, 4IMY, 4OGR, 4OR5
Enzyme activity
EC #	BRENDA	ExPASy	KEGG	MetaCyc
2.7.11.22	↗	↗	↗	↗
2.7.11.23	↗	↗	↗	↗

Gene location (Human)
Chr.	Chromosome 9 (human)
Band	9q34.11	Start	127,785,679 bp
Band	9q34.11	End	127,790,792 bp

Gene location (Mouse)
Chr.	Chromosome 2 (mouse)
Band	2|2 B	Start	32,595,796 bp
Band	2|2 B	End	32,603,088 bp
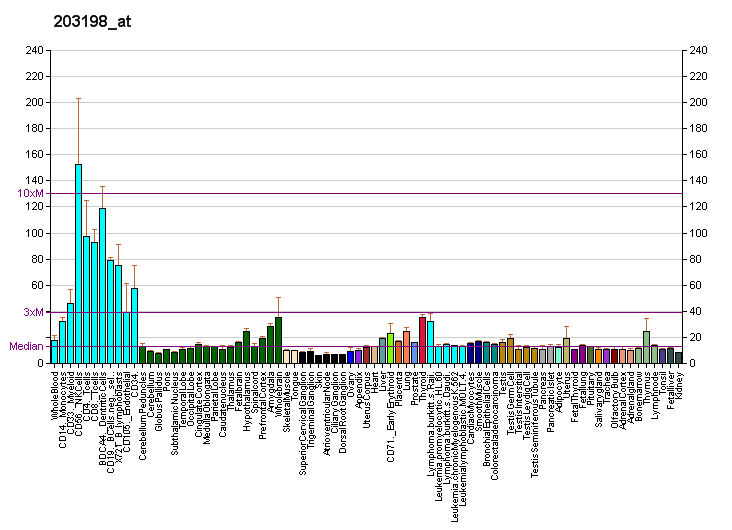
RNA expression pattern
Bgee	Human / Mouse (ortholog); Top expressed in: right uterine tube; left ovary; right ovary; sural nerve; left uterine tube; gastric mucosa; right hemisphere of cerebellum; anterior pituitary; body of uterus; canal of the cervix / Top expressed in: granulocyte; stroma of bone marrow; superior frontal gyrus; thymus; fetal liver hematopoietic progenitor cell; tibiofemoral joint; primary visual cortex; dermis; epiblast; spleen; More reference expression data
BioGPS	More reference expression data
Gene ontology
Molecular function	nucleotide binding; transferase activity; protein kinase activity; 7SK snRNA binding; transcription coactivator binding; snRNA binding; ATP binding; RNA polymerase II core promoter sequence-specific DNA binding; DNA binding; transcription factor binding; protein binding; protein serine/threonine kinase activity; chromatin binding; kinase activity; cyclin-dependent protein serine/threonine kinase activity; RNA polymerase II CTD heptapeptide repeat kinase activity; protein kinase binding; cyclin binding; RNA polymerase II cis-regulatory region sequence-specific DNA binding
Cellular component	cytoplasm; nucleus; membrane; nucleoplasm; transcription elongation factor complex; cyclin/CDK positive transcription elongation factor complex; PML body; chromosome; cytoplasmic ribonucleoprotein granule; cyclin-dependent protein kinase holoenzyme complex
Biological process	positive regulation of cardiac muscle hypertrophy; positive regulation of mRNA 3'-UTR binding; regulation of muscle cell differentiation; negative regulation of mRNA polyadenylation; DNA repair; cellular response to cytokine stimulus; positive regulation of viral transcription; replication fork processing; protein phosphorylation; regulation of histone modification; regulation of mitotic cell cycle; cellular response to DNA damage stimulus; transcription initiation from RNA polymerase II promoter; regulation of DNA repair; regulation of transcription, DNA-templated; cell population proliferation; transcription by RNA polymerase II; phosphorylation; positive regulation of histone H2B ubiquitination; positive regulation of transcription by RNA polymerase II; transcription, DNA-templated; snRNA transcription by RNA polymerase II; transcription elongation from RNA polymerase II promoter; phosphorylation of RNA polymerase II C-terminal domain; positive regulation of transcription elongation from RNA polymerase II promoter
Sources:Amigo / QuickGO
Orthologs
Databases	NCBI: entry; OMA: entry
Species	Human	Mouse
Entrez	1025	107951
Ensembl	ENSG00000136807	ENSMUSG00000009555
UniProt	P50750	Q99J95
RefSeq (mRNA)	NM_001261	NM_130860
RefSeq (protein)	NP_001252; NP_001252.1	NP_570930
Location (UCSC)	Chr 9: 127.79 – 127.79 Mb	Chr 2: 32.6 – 32.6 Mb
PubMed search
- Wikidata
View/Edit Human	View/Edit Mouse

Cyclin-dependent kinase 9 or CDK9 is a cyclin-dependent kinase associated with P-TEFb.

== Function ==
The protein encoded by this gene is a member of the cyclin-dependent kinase (CDK) family. CDK family members are highly similar to the gene products of S. cerevisiae cdc28, and S. pombe cdc2, and known as important cell cycle regulators. This kinase was found to be a component of the multiprotein complex TAK/P-TEFb, which is an elongation factor for RNA polymerase II-directed transcription and functions by phosphorylating the C-terminal domain of the largest subunit of RNA polymerase II. This protein forms a complex with and is regulated by its regulatory subunit cyclin T or cyclin K. HIV-1 Tat protein was found to interact with this protein and cyclin T, which suggested a possible involvement of this protein in AIDS.

CDK9 is also known to associate with other proteins such as TRAF2, and be involved in differentiation of skeletal muscle. In healthy cellular environments, the enzymatic activity of the resulting P-TEFb complex is tightly regulated and maintained in equilibrium via temporary sequestration by the 7SK snRNP negative regulatory complex.

== Inhibitors ==
Traditional small-molecule inhibitors of cdk9 have historically targeted the highly conserved ATP-binding pocket of the kinase, through clinical translation has often faced challenges regarding selectivity against other CDK isoforms. Based on molecular docking results, Ligands-3, 5, 14, and 16 were screened among 17 different Pyrrolone-fused benzosuberene compounds as potent and specific inhibitors without any cross-reactivity against different CDK isoforms.

Analysis of MD simulations and MM-PBSA studies, revealed the binding energy profiles of all the selected complexes. Selected ligands performed better than the experimental drug candidate (Roscovitine). Ligands-5 and 16 show specificity for CDK9. These ligands are expected to possess lower risk of side effects due to their natural origin.

== Interactions ==
CDK9 has been shown to interact with:

- Androgen receptor,
- CDC34 and
- CCNK,
- CCNT1,
- CCNT2,
- MYBL2,
- RELA,
- RB1,
- SKP1A.
- SUPT5H, and
- RNAP II.

== See also ==
- Enitociclib
