= Transcriptional addiction in cancer =

Transcriptional addiction, also called transcriptional dependency or transcription factor dependency, is a process in cancer biology in which cancer cells become dependent on abnormal transcription factors to sustain their survival, growth, and proliferation. This 'addiction' or dependency occurs because cancer cells often have dysregulated gene expression pathways, allowing them to evade normal cellular processes such as apoptosis. Transcriptional addiction presents an opportunity for targeted cancer therapies by inhibiting the transcriptional machinery essential for tumor cell survival.

== Mechanism ==
Transcriptional addiction in cancer is typically associated with oncogenes and transcription factors that are overexpressed or aberrantly activated. These factors drive the constant transcription of genes necessary for tumor maintenance, often in pathways that regulate cell growth, proliferation, and metabolism.

Oncogene-driven transcription
Many cancers rely on oncogenes such as Myc, which promotes the transcription of a wide array of genes that support uncontrolled cell growth and proliferation.
Super-enhancers
Cancer cells often exhibit abnormally large clusters of DNA enhancers, called super-enhancers, that drive the expression of oncogenes and other critical transcriptional programs.

== Role of transcription factors ==
Several transcription factors are implicated in the process of transcriptional addiction in cancer. These factors bind to promoter regions of DNA and regulate the transcription of oncogenic genes:

MYC
The MYC family of transcription factors is one of the most well-known drivers of transcriptional addiction. In cancers, the MYC protein regulates genes involved in cell cycle progression, metabolism, and survival, making it a prime target for cancer therapies.
BRD4
BRD4, a member of the BET (Bromodomain and Extra-Terminal) family of proteins, plays a crucial role in transcriptional regulation in cancer. BRD4 is involved in recognizing acetylated histones and promoting the transcription of oncogenic genes.

== Therapeutic targeting ==
The concept of transcriptional addiction has opened avenues for targeted cancer therapies that aim to inhibit transcriptional regulators. Inhibitors targeting transcription factors, enhancers, and the transcriptional machinery are being explored in preclinical and clinical settings:

BET Inhibitors
BET bromodomain inhibitors, such as JQ1, block the function of BRD4, reducing the transcription of oncogenes like Myc. These inhibitors are being tested in clinical trials for various cancers.
CDK9 Inhibitors
Cyclin-dependent kinase 9 (CDK9) is involved in the regulation of transcription elongation, and inhibitors targeting CDK9 are being explored as a means to disrupt transcriptional programs in cancers reliant on transcriptional addiction.

== Clinical implications ==
Targeting transcriptional addiction holds promise for treating cancers that are resistant to conventional therapies. Ongoing research focuses on identifying cancers that are particularly dependent on transcriptional programs and developing drugs that can selectively inhibit these processes. Early-phase clinical trials are exploring the efficacy of BET and CDK inhibitors, with promising results in some cancers such as hematological malignancies and solid tumors.

== Challenges and future directions ==
One of the key obstacles is the development of resistance to transcriptional inhibitors. Cancer cells may adapt by upregulating compensatory pathways, reducing the effectiveness of these therapies. Additionally, transcriptional inhibitors may have adverse side effects, leading to toxicity in normal cells.

Ongoing research aims to improve the specificity of transcriptional inhibitors and combine them with other therapies, such as immunotherapies, to overcome resistance and enhance anti-cancer efficacy.
