= JQ1 =

Chemical compound

Identifiers
- IUPAC name: (S)-tert-butyl 2-(4-(4-chlorophenyl)-2,3,9-trimethyl-6H-thieno[3,2-f][1,2,4]triazolo[4,3-a][1,4]diazepin-6-yl)acetate
- CAS Number: 1268524-70-4
- PubChem CID: 46907787
- IUPHAR/BPS: 7511
- ChemSpider: 26323622
- UNII: 1MRH0IMX0W
- ChEBI: CHEBI:137113
- CompTox Dashboard (EPA): DTXSID20155309

Chemical and physical data
- Formula: C_{23}H_{25}ClN_{4}O_{2}S
- Molar mass: 456.99 g·mol^{−1}
- 3D model (JSmol): Interactive image
- SMILES: O=C(C[C@H]1C2=NN=C(N2C3=C(C(C4=CC=C(C=C4)Cl)=N1)C(C)=C(S3)C)C)OC(C)(C)C
- InChI: InChI=1S/C23H25ClN4O2S/c1-12-13(2)31-22-19(12)20(15-7-9-16(24)10-8-15)25-17(11-18(29)30-23(4,5)6)21-27-26-14(3)28(21)22/h7-10,17H,11H2,1-6H3/t17-/m0/s1; Key:DNVXATUJJDPFDM-KRWDZBQOSA-N

JQ1 is a thienotriazolodiazepine and a potent inhibitor of the BET family of bromodomain proteins which include BRD2, BRD3, BRD4, and the testis-specific protein BRDT in mammals. BET inhibitors structurally similar to JQ1 are being tested in clinical trials for a variety of cancers including NUT midline carcinoma. It was developed by the James Bradner laboratory at Brigham and Women's Hospital and named after chemist Jun Qi. The chemical structure was inspired by patent of similar BET inhibitors by Mitsubishi Tanabe Pharma. Structurally it is related to benzodiazepines. While widely used in laboratory applications, JQ1 is not itself being used in human clinical trials because it has a short half-life.

== Efficacy in mouse models of cancer ==
Interest in JQ1 as a cancer therapeutic stemmed from its ability to inhibit BRD4 and BRD3, both of which form fusion oncogenes that drive NUT midline carcinoma. Subsequent work demonstrated that a number of cancers including some forms of acute myelogenous leukemia (AML), multiple myeloma (MM), and acute lymphoblastic leukemia (ALL) were also highly sensitive to BET inhibitors.

== In other applications ==
JQ1 has also been investigated for other applications in the treatment of HIV infection, as a male contraceptive, and in slowing the progression of heart disease.

JQ1 has been functionalized in numerous different studies of targeted protein degradation. For example, conjugation of JQ1 to phthalimide moieties such as that found in thalidomide recruits the E3 ubiquitin ligase cereblon (CRBN) to effect proteasomal degradation of BRD4. Monovalent degraders based on functionalizing JQ1 have also been discovered.

Fusion of JQ1 to other molecules targeting specific genomic loci has been demonstrated to rewire transcription.

== See also ==
- Male contraceptive
- CDD-2807
- TDI-11861
- YCT529
