= Apabetalone =

Names
- IUPAC name 2-[4-(2-Hydroxyethoxy)-3,5-dimethylphenyl]-5,7-dimethoxy-4(3H)-quinazolinone
- Other names RVX208, RVX-208

Identifiers
CAS Number	1044870-39-4
3D model (JSmol)	Interactive image
ChEMBL	ChEMBL2393130
ChemSpider	25069708
DrugBank	DB12000
ECHA InfoCard	100.242.963
EC Number	12-112-4
KEGG	D11131
PubChem CID	135564749
UNII	8R4A7GDZ1D
CompTox Dashboard (EPA)	DTXSID90146502
- InChI: InChI=1S/C20H22N2O5/c1-11-7-13(8-12(2)18(11)27-6-5-23)19-21-15-9-14(25-3)10-16(26-4)17(15)20(24)22-19/h7-10,23H,5-6H2,1-4H3,(H,21,22,24) Key: NETXMUIMUZJUTB-UHFFFAOYSA-N
- SMILES: CC1=CC(=CC(=C1OCCO)C)C2=NC3=C(C(=CC(=C3)OC)OC)C(=O)N2

Properties
Chemical formula	C_{20}H_{22}N_{2}O_{5}
Molar mass	370.405 g·mol^{−1}
Density	1.3±0.1 g/cm^{3}

Hazards
- GHS labelling
Pictograms	(GHS08: Health hazard)
Signal word	Warning
Hazard statements	H371
Precautionary statements	P260, P264, P270, P309+P311, P405, P501
- Except where otherwise noted, data are given for materials in their standard state (at 25 °C [77 °F], 100 kPa). Infobox references

Apabetalone (development codes RVX 208, RVX-208, and RVX000222) is an orally available small molecule created by Resverlogix Corp. that is being evaluated in clinical trials for the treatment of atherosclerosis and associated cardiovascular disease (CVD). In the phase II clinical trial ASSURE in patients with angiographic coronary disease and low high-density lipoprotein cholesterol (HDL-C) levels, apabetalone showed no greater increase in HDL-cholesterol (HDL-c) and apolipoprotein A-I (ApoA-I) levels or incremental regression of atherosclerosis than administration of placebo, while causing a statistically significant greater incidence of elevated liver enzymes. However, pooled analysis of the effect of apabetalone in three phase II clinical trials ASSERT, ASSURE, and SUSTAIN demonstrated increases in HDL-cholesterol (HDL-c) and apolipoprotein A-I (ApoA-I) levels, as well as decreases in the incidence of major adverse cardiac events (MACE). Reduction of MACE was more profound in patients with diabetes mellitus. In a short-term study in prediabetics, favorable changes in glucose metabolism were observed in patients receiving apabetalone. An international, multicenter phase III trial, "Effect of RVX000222 on Time to Major Adverse Cardiovascular Events in High-Risk Type 2 Diabetes Mellitus Subjects with Coronary Artery Disease" (BETonMACE) commenced in October 2015. The trial is designed to determine whether apabetalone in combination with statins can decrease cardiac events compared to treatment with statins alone.

== Mechanism of action ==
The molecular targets of apabetalone are bromodomain and extra terminal domain (BET) proteins, and in particular the BET family member BRD4. BET proteins, which contain two bromodomains, interact with acetylated lysines on histones bound to DNA to regulate gene transcription via an epigenetic mechanism. Apabetalone selectively binds to the second bromodomain (BD2). When apabetalone binds to BRD4, it impacts key biological processes that contribute to CVD such as cholesterol levels and inflammation.
Apabetalone stimulates ApoA-I gene expression and production of the protein. ApoA-I is the main protein component of high-density lipoprotein (HDL), which can transfer cholesterol from atherosclerotic plaque in arteries to liver for excretion via the reverse cholesterol transport (RCT) pathway. This process is thought to stabilize the plaque to avoid coronary events. Clinical trials have shown apabetalone increases ApoA-I and HDL. Further, serum from individuals taking apabetalone had increased cholesterol efflux capacity, indicating the HDL generated in response to apabetalone functions in RCT.

Inflammation is also a major contributor to atherosclerosis and CVD. Both ApoA-I induction and anti-inflammatory effects are common properties of BET inhibitors. In clinical trials, more favorable effects of apabetalone on coronary disease progression have been observed in patients with elevated levels of inflammatory markers. Apabetalone was also reported to reduce inflammation in pre-clinical models. Subsequent research showed apabetalone targets multiple processes that underlie CVD. The impact on any of these pathways, independently or cumulatively, may contribute to the lower incidence of MACE observed in clinical trials.
