= Birabresib =

Chemical compound

Legal status
- Legal status: Investigational

Identifiers
- IUPAC name: 2-[(6S)-4-(4-Chlorophenyl)-2,3,9-trimethyl-6H-thieno[3,2-f] [1,2,4]triazolo[4,3-a] [1,4]diazepin-6-yl]-N-(4-hydroxyphenyl)acetamide
- CAS Number: 202590-98-5
- PubChem CID: 9936746
- IUPHAR/BPS: 8359
- DrugBank: DB15189
- ChemSpider: 8112374
- UNII: X40LKS49S3
- KEGG: D10911
- ChEBI: CHEBI:230508
- ChEMBL: ChEMBL3581647
- CompTox Dashboard (EPA): DTXSID701103937

Chemical and physical data
- Formula: C_{25}H_{22}ClN_{5}O_{2}S
- Molar mass: 491.99 g·mol^{−1}
- 3D model (JSmol): Interactive image
- SMILES: CC1=C(SC2=C1C(=N[C@H](C3=NN=C(N32)C)CC(=O)NC4=CC=C(C=C4)O)C5=CC=C(C=C5)Cl)C
- InChI: InChI=1S/C25H22ClN5O2S/c1-13-14(2)34-25-22(13)23(16-4-6-17(26)7-5-16)28-20(24-30-29-15(3)31(24)25)12-21(33)27-18-8-10-19(32)11-9-18/h4-11,20,32H,12H2,1-3H3,(H,27,33)/t20-/m0/s1; Key:GNMUEVRJHCWKTO-FQEVSTJZSA-N

Birabresib (OTX-015, MK-8628) is an experimental small molecule inhibitor of BRD2, BRD3, and BRD4 under investigation for the treatment of cancer. It is in development by Merck & Co. It is currently in clinical trials for leukemia and glioblastoma.

Birabresib competitively binds to the acetyl-lysine binding pockets on BET proteins, thereby disrupting their role in regulating gene transcription, especially genes controlling proliferation and survival, such as MYC. Birabresib has demonstrated potent preclinical antileukemic activity and has moved into clinical evaluation for hematologic malignancies, including early-phase studies in acute myeloid leukemia (AML).

Initial clinical trials revealed toxicities, including thrombocytopenia and gastrointestinal symptoms, while showing signs of clinical activity, particularly transient reductions in peripheral immature blood cells and disease markers.

Clinical investigations of Birabresib in both hematologic cancers and solid tumors revealed a safety profile consistent with other BET inhibitors, with common adverse effects including cytopenias, gastrointestinal disturbances, and fatigue. It appears to be more active against hematological cancers, and optimal patient selection along with combination strategies are ongoing areas of clinical research. Overall, Birabresib is considered a first-in-class BET inhibitor, representative of a novel epigenetic therapeutic approach in oncology.
