= Richard A. Young =

American geneticist (born 1954)

Richard Young
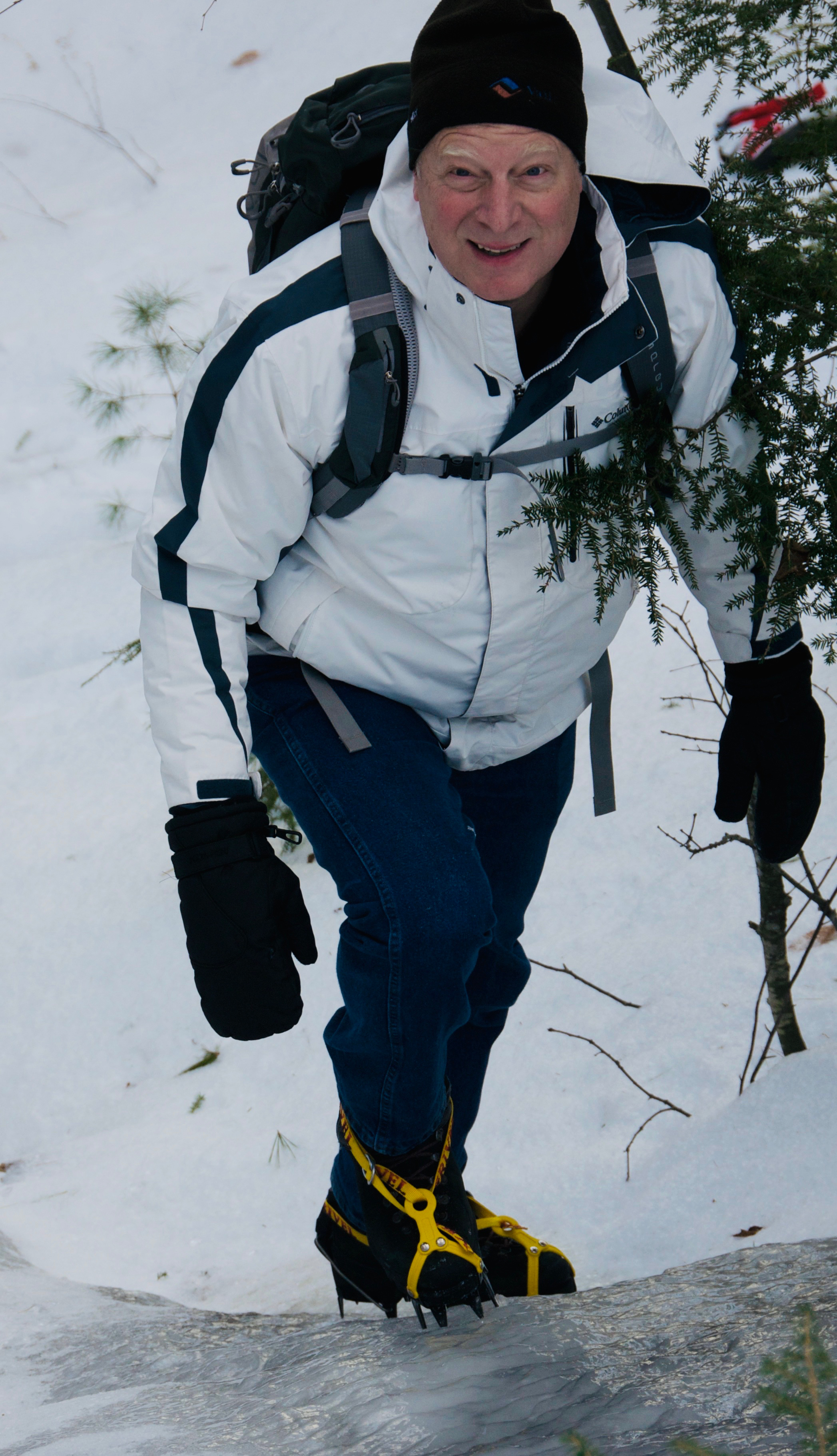
- Born: Richard Allen Young; March 12, 1954 (age 72); Pittsburgh, Pennsylvania, United States
- Education: Indiana University (BS); Yale University (PhD)
- Awards: Scientific American 50 (2006); Member, National Academy of Sciences (2012); Member, National Academy of Medicine (2019)
- Scientific career
- Fields: Genetics; Genomics; Molecular Biology; Cancer
- Workplaces: Whitehead Institute; Massachusetts Institute of Technology
- Doctoral advisor: Joan A. Steitz
- Website: wi.mit.edu/people/faculty/young

Richard Allen Young (born March 12, 1954) is an American geneticist, a Member of Whitehead Institute, and a professor of biology at the Massachusetts Institute of Technology. He is a pioneer in the systems biology of gene control who has developed genomics technologies and concepts key to understanding gene control in human health and disease. He has served as an advisor to the World Health Organization and the National Institutes of Health. He is a member of the National Academy of Sciences and the National Academy of Medicine. Scientific American has recognized him as one of the top 50 leaders in science, technology and business. Young is among the most Highly Cited Researchers in his field.

== Education ==
Young was educated at Indiana University (Bachelor of Science, 1975) and Yale University (PhD, 1979).

== Research and career ==
Young has made major contributions to the understanding of gene control in human development and disease. He discovered that a small set of human embryonic stem cell master transcription factors form a core regulatory circuitry that controls the gene expression program of these cells. This concept of core regulatory circuitry helps guide current efforts to understand gene control, to develop reprogramming protocols for other human cell types and to understand how gene dysregulation contributes to disease.

Young has introduced the concept of transcriptional amplification and described how much of the gene control program in cancer cells is amplified by oncogenic transcription factors such as c-MYC. According to Young, most genes experience transcription initiation, but it is the control of transcription elongation that plays key roles in cell control in health and disease.

Young discovered that large clusters of gene control elements, called super-enhancers, regulate genes that play prominent roles in cell identity. Furthermore, Young showed that disease-associated human genome variation occurs frequently in these super-enhancers and that cancer cell super-enhancers are especially vulnerable to certain transcriptional drugs.

Young has proposed that control of gene expression occurs within insulated neighborhoods, which are structural DNA loops that contain enhancers and their target genes. He has further shown that disruption of these neighborhoods in disease contributes to gene dysregulation.

Young and his colleagues have proposed that regulation of genes occurs in nuclear bodies called biomolecular condensates. These condensates compartmentalize and concentrate the diverse biomolecules needed for proper regulation of gene expression. Young recently discovered that cancer drugs are concentrated in cellular condensates and has proposed that this pharmacodynamic behavior contributes to optimal drug action.

=== Other activities ===
Young is also an educator, entrepreneur and aviator. He teaches three courses at MIT, "COVID-19, SARS-CoV-2 and the Pandemic", "Cell Biology: Structure and Functions of the Nucleus" and "Topics of Mammalian Development and Genetics", and guest lectures at numerous universities and research institutes worldwide. Young has founded multiple companies in the biotechnology industry, including Syros Pharmaceuticals, Inc., CAMP4 Therapeutics, Omega Therapeutics and Dewpoint Therapeutics. He holds a commercial pilot license and is a member of the Aircraft Owners and Pilots Association.
