= BET inhibitor =

Drug class

BET inhibitors are a class of drugs that reversibly bind the bromodomains of Bromodomain and Extra-Terminal motif (BET) proteins BRD2, BRD3, BRD4, and BRDT, and prevent protein-protein interaction between BET proteins and acetylated histones and transcription factors.

== Discovery and development ==
Thienodiazepine BET inhibitors were discovered in a phenotypic drug screen by scientists at Yoshitomi Pharmaceuticals (now Mitsubishi Tanabe Pharma) in the early 1990s, and their potential both as anti-inflammatories and anti-cancer agents noted. OncoEthix (acquired by Merck in 2014) in-licensed OTX-015 from Mitsubishi and in 2012 initiated the first BET inhibitor clinical trial for oncology (ClinicalTrials.gov Identifier: NCT01713582). BET inhibitors were also independently discovered in phenotypic screens for small molecule inducers of Apolipoprotein A-I by both GSK and Resverlogix. In 2010, the use of JQ1, a tert-butyl synthetic precursor of OTX-015, was published having activity in vitro in NUT midline carcinoma. Since this time a number of molecules have been described that are capable of targeting BET bromodomains.

BET inhibitors have been described that are able to discriminate between the first and second bromodomains of BET proteins (BD1 vs BD2). However, no BET inhibitor has yet been described that can reliably distinguish between BET family members (BRD2 vs BRD3 vs BRD4 vs BRDT). Only in the research context has targeting individual BET proteins been achieved by mutating them to be more sensitive to a derivative of JQ1 / I-BET 762.

== Mechanism of action ==
Interest in using BET inhibitors in cancer began with the observation that chromosomal translocations involving BET genes BRD3 and BRD4 drove the pathogenesis of the rare cancer NUT midline carcinoma. Subsequent research uncovered the dependence of some forms of acute myeloid leukemia, multiple myeloma and acute lymphoblastic leukemia on the BET protein BRD4, and the sensitivity of these cancers to BET inhibitors. In many cases, expression of the growth promoting transcription factor Myc is blocked by BET inhibitors. BRD2 and BRD3 are functionally redundant and may be more important as therapeutic targets than is appreciated in studies depleting each BET protein individually. Recent studies also showed that BET inhibitors can be instrumental in overcoming resistance to other targeted therapies when used in combination therapies. Examples include use of BET inhibitors in combination with γ-secretase inhibitors for T-cell acute lymphoblastic leukemia and BRAF-inhibitor (vemurafenib) for BRAF-inhibitor resistant melanomas carrying the BRAFV600E mutation.

== Specific BET inhibitors ==
BET inhibitors have been developed by publicly funded research labs as well as pharmaceutical companies including GlaxoSmithKline, Oncoethix (purchased by Merck & Co. in 2014), Oncoethix, Constellation pharmaceuticals, Resverlogix Corp and Zenith epigenetics. Notable BET inhibitors include:

=== Targeting both BD1 and BD2 (bromodomains) ===
- I-BET 151 (GSK1210151A)
- I-BET 762 (GSK525762)
- OTX-015
- TEN-010
- CPI-203
- CPI-0610

=== Selective targeting of BD1 ===
- olinone, e.g. to affect the differentiation of oligodendrocyte progenitor cells.

=== Selective targeting of BD2 ===
- RVX-208
- ABBV-744

=== Dual kinase-bromodomain inhibitors ===
- LY294002 (some PI3K and BRD2, BRD3, and BRD4)

=== Bivalent BET inhibitors ===
- AZD5153
- MT-1
- MS645

=== BRD2, BRD3, BRD4, BRDT ===
Zavabresib has been described as inhibiting all four BET domain proteins (BRD2, BRD3, BRD4, BRDT).

== See also ==
- Bromodomain
- Bromodomain-containing protein
- NUT midline carcinoma
- BRD2
- BRD3
- BRD4
- BRDT
