= Ezobresib =

Clinical data
- Other names: BMS-986158

Identifiers
- IUPAC name: 2-[3-(3,5-dimethyltriazol-4-yl)-5-[(S)-oxan-4-yl(phenyl)methyl]pyrido[3,2-b]indol-7-yl]propan-2-ol
- CAS Number: 1800340-40-2
- PubChem CID: 118196485
- DrugBank: DB15435
- ChemSpider: 58828664
- UNII: X8BW0MQ5PI
- KEGG: D12710
- ChEMBL: ChEMBL4297458

Chemical and physical data
- Formula: C_{30}H_{33}N_{5}O_{2}
- Molar mass: 495.627 g·mol^{−1}
- 3D model (JSmol): Interactive image
- SMILES: CC1=C(N(N=N1)C)C2=CC3=C(C4=C(N3[C@@H](C5CCOCC5)C6=CC=CC=C6)C=C(C=C4)C(C)(C)O)N=C2
- InChI: InChI=InChI=1S/C30H33N5O2/c1-19-28(34(4)33-32-19)22-16-26-27(31-18-22)24-11-10-23(30(2,3)36)17-25(24)35(26)29(20-8-6-5-7-9-20)21-12-14-37-15-13-21/h5-11,16-18,21,29,36H,12-15H2,1-4H3/t29-/m1/s1; Key:KGERZPVQIRYWRK-GDLZYMKVSA-N

Ezobresib is an investigational new drug that has been evaluated for the treatment of cancer. It inhibits Bromodomain and Extra-Terminal domain (BET) proteins, with potential antineoplastic activity. Developed by Bristol Myers Squibb, this therapeutic agent has been studied for its efficacy in treating various cancers, including solid tumors and hematological malignancies. Despite showing promise in early-phase clinical trials, recent developments suggest that Bristol Myers Squibb has decided to discontinue further development of ezobresib.
