= BRD9 =

Mammalian protein found in Homo sapiens

Identifiers
- Aliases: BRD9, LAVS3040, PRO9856, bromodomain containing 9
- External IDs: OMIM: 618465; MGI: 2145317; GeneCards: BRD9
Available structures
PDB	Ortholog search: PDBe RCSB
PDB	List of PDB id codes 3HME, 4NQN, 4UIT, 4UIU, 4UIV, 4UIW, 4XY8, 4Z6H, 4Z6I, 4YY4, 4YY6, 4YYD, 4YYG, 4YYH, 4YYI, 4YYJ, 4YYK, 5E9V, 5F1H, 5F1L, 5F2P, 5F25, 5EU1, 5IGN, 5JI8

Gene location (Human)
Chr.	Chromosome 5 (human)
Band	5p15.33	Start	850,291 bp
Band	5p15.33	End	892,824 bp

Gene location (Mouse)
Chr.	Chromosome 13 (mouse)
Band	13|13 C1	Start	73,937,811 bp
Band	13|13 C1	End	73,960,895 bp
RNA expression pattern
Bgee	Human / Mouse (ortholog); Top expressed in: sural nerve; ventricular zone; Achilles tendon; ganglionic eminence; granulocyte; thymus; right hemisphere of cerebellum; skin of abdomen; skin of leg; left testis / Top expressed in: primary visual cortex; neural layer of retina; spermatocyte; Region I of hippocampus proper; dentate gyrus of hippocampal formation granule cell; cumulus cell; ventricular zone; hand; superior frontal gyrus; granulocyte; More reference expression data
BioGPS	n/a
Gene ontology
Molecular function	protein binding; lysine-acetylated histone binding; nucleic acid binding
Cellular component	cellular component; SWI/SNF complex
Biological process	regulation of transcription, DNA-templated; transcription, DNA-templated; biological process; chromatin organization
Sources:Amigo / QuickGO
Orthologs
Databases	NCBI: entry; OMA: entry
Species	Human	Mouse
Entrez	65980	105246
Ensembl	ENSG00000028310	ENSMUSG00000057649
UniProt	Q9H8M2	Q3UQU0
RefSeq (mRNA)	NM_001009877; NM_023924; NM_001317951	NM_001024508; NM_001308041; NM_001378947; NM_001378948
RefSeq (protein)	NP_001009877; NP_001304880; NP_076413; NP_001362790; NP_001362791 NP_001362792; NP_001362806; NP_001362807; NP_001362808	NP_001019679; NP_001294970; NP_001365876; NP_001365877
Location (UCSC)	Chr 5: 0.85 – 0.89 Mb	Chr 13: 73.94 – 73.96 Mb
PubMed search
- Wikidata
View/Edit Human	View/Edit Mouse

Bromodomain-containing protein 9 is a protein that in humans is encoded by the BRD9 gene.

== Structure and interaction ==
BRD9 contains a bromodomain. It is closely related to BRD7. BRD9 is present in some SWI/SNF ATPase remodeling complexes.

== Role in cancer ==
The BRD9 gene is frequently present in variable copy number in lung cancer.

== Small molecule inhibition ==
Small molecules capable of binding to the bromodomain of BRD9 have been developed.

== See also ==
Bromodomain
