= Transcriptional amplification =

Transcriptional amplification involves increases in global levels of mRNAs produced from expressed genes and may be either uniform across all expressed genes or variable from gene to gene.

In genetics, transcriptional amplification is the process in which the total amount of messenger RNA (mRNA) molecules from expressed genes is increased during disease, development, or in response to stimuli.

In eukaryotic cells, the transcribing activity of RNA Polymerase II results in mRNA production. Transcriptional amplification is specifically defined as the increase in per-cell abundance of this set of expressed mRNAs. Transcriptional amplification is caused by changes in the amount or activity of transcription-regulating proteins.

== Mechanisms of transcriptional amplification ==
Gene expression is regulated by numerous types of proteins that directly or indirectly influence transcription by RNA Polymerase II. As opposed to transcriptional activators or repressors that selectively activate or repress specific genes, amplifiers of transcription act globally on expressed genes.

Several known regulators of transcriptional amplification have been characterized including the oncogene Myc, the Rett syndrome protein MECP2, and the BET bromodomain protein BRD4. In particular, the Myc protein amplifies transcription by binding to promoters and enhancers of active genes where it directly recruits the transcription elongation factor P-TEFb. Furthermore, the BRD4 protein is a regulator of Myc activity.

== Identifying and measuring transcriptional amplification ==
Commonly used gene expression experiments interrogate the expression of one gene (qPCR) or many genes (microarray, RNA-Seq). These techniques generally measure relative mRNA levels and employ normalization methods that assume only a small number of genes show altered expression. In contrast, single cell or cell-count normalized absolute measurements of mRNA abundance are required to reveal transcriptional amplification. Additionally, global measurements of mRNA or total mRNA per cell can also uncover evidence for transcriptional amplification.

Cells in which transcription has been amplified have additional hallmarks suggesting that amplification has occurred. Cells with increased mRNA levels may be larger, consistent with an increased abundance of gene products. This increase in the amount of gene products may result in a decreased doubling time.

== Role in disease ==
Transcriptional amplification has been implicated in cancer, Rett syndrome, heart disease, Down syndrome, and cellular aging. In cancer, Myc-driven transcriptional amplification is posited to help tumor cells overcome rate-limiting constraints in growth and proliferation. Drugs that target the transcription or mRNA processing machinery are known to be particularly effective against Myc-driven tumor models, suggesting that dampening of transcriptional amplification can have anti-tumor effects. Similarly, small molecules targeting the BET bromodomain protein BRD4, which is up-regulated during heart failure, can block cardiac hypertrophy in mouse models. In Rett syndrome, which is caused by loss of function of the transcriptional regulator MeCP2, MeCP2 was shown to specifically amplify transcription in neurons and not neuronal precursors. Restoration of MeCP2 reverses disease symptoms associated with Rett syndrome
