= YCT529 =

Chemical compound

Clinical data
- Other names: YCT-529

Identifiers
- IUPAC name: 4-[5-[2,2-Dimethyl-4-(4-methylphenyl)chromen-6-yl]-1H-pyrrol-2-yl]benzoic acid
- CAS Number: 2863670-66-8
- PubChem CID: 162679554
- ChemSpider: 128921383
- UNII: UKJ8GGS7PP

Chemical and physical data
- Formula: C_{29}H_{25}NO_{3}
- Molar mass: 435.523 g·mol^{−1}
- 3D model (JSmol): Interactive image
- SMILES: CC1=CC=C(C=C1)C2=CC(OC3=C2C=C(C=C3)C4=CC=C(N4)C5=CC=C(C=C5)C(=O)O)(C)C
- InChI: InChI=1S/C29H25NO3/c1-18-4-6-19(7-5-18)24-17-29(2,3)33-27-15-12-22(16-23(24)27)26-14-13-25(30-26)20-8-10-21(11-9-20)28(31)32/h4-17,30H,1-3H3,(H,31,32); Key:QLXSCDXZOYRDAX-UHFFFAOYSA-N

YCT529 is an experimental non-hormonal male contraceptive developed by YourChoice Therapeutics. It functions as a selective antagonist of the retinoic acid receptor alpha (RAR-α), a nuclear receptor involved in vitamin A signaling. By inhibiting RAR-α, YCT529 disrupts spermatogenesis, leading to temporary infertility. YCT529 targets RAR-α, which plays a crucial role in the vitamin A signaling pathway essential for sperm production. By selectively inhibiting RAR-α, the drug impedes the development and maturation of sperm cells without affecting other physiological processes governed by vitamin A.

== Preclinical studies ==
In preclinical trials involving male mice, YCT529 demonstrated a 99% efficacy rate in preventing pregnancy. The contraceptive effect was fully reversible, with fertility restored within four to six weeks after discontinuation. No significant side effects were observed during these studies. Similar outcomes were reported in studies with non-human primates, where sperm counts decreased significantly after two weeks of dosing, and normal fertility resumed post-treatment.

== Clinical trials ==
A Phase 1 clinical trial commenced in December 2023 in the United Kingdom, conducted by Quotient Sciences. The study aimed to assess the safety, tolerability, pharmacokinetics, and pharmacodynamics of single ascending oral doses of YCT529 in 16 healthy male volunteers. Preliminary results indicated that the drug was well-tolerated with no serious adverse events reported. In a first in-human Phase 1 study, it was reported that YCT-529 is well tolerated.

Following the initial study, a 28-day trial involving 50 men aged 28 to 70 was initiated to further evaluate the drug's safety and efficacy. A subsequent 90-day mid-stage study is planned to begin in the second quarter of 2025.

== Development and funding ==
YCT529 was developed in collaboration with Dr. Gunda Georg, a medicinal chemist at the University of Minnesota. The project has received funding from the National Institutes of Health and the Male Contraceptive Initiative. In 2022, YourChoice Therapeutics secured a $15 million Series A investment to support the development of hormone-free contraceptive solutions.

== See also ==
- Adjudin
- CDD-2807
- Dimethandrolone undecanoate
- JQ1
- TDI-11861
