= CDD-2807 =

Chemical compound

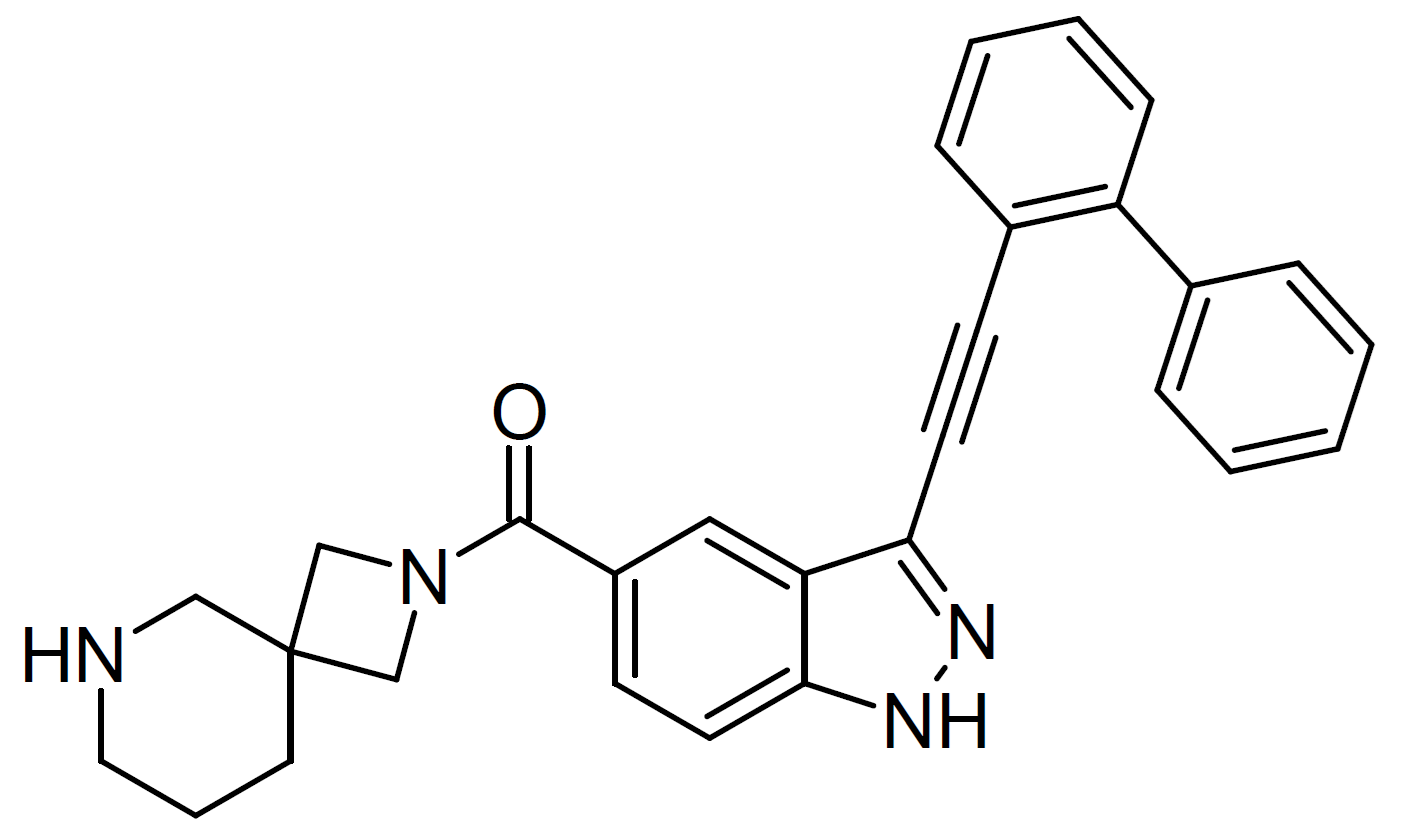

Identifiers
- IUPAC name: (3-([1,1'-Biphenyl]-2-ylethynyl)-1H-indazol-5-yl)(2,6-diazaspiro[3.5]nonan-2-yl)methanone

Chemical and physical data
- Formula: C_{29}H_{26}N_{4}O
- Molar mass: 446.554 g·mol^{−1}
- 3D model (JSmol): Interactive image
- SMILES: O=C(N1CC2(C1)CNCCC2)c1cc2c([NH]nc2C#Cc2ccccc2c2ccccc2)cc1
- InChI: InChI=1S/C29H26N4O/c34-28(33-19-29(20-33)15-6-16-30-18-29)23-12-14-27-25(17-23)26(31-32-27)13-11-22-9-4-5-10-24(22)21-7-2-1-3-8-21/h1-5,7-10,12,14,17,30H,6,15-16,18-20H2,(H,31,32); Key:YXMAOKMVGOSRPS-UHFFFAOYSA-N

CDD-2807 is a chemical compound which acts as a potent and selective inhibitor of serine/threonine-protein kinase 33 (STK33), with a IC_{50} of 9.2 nM. In animal studies it causes production of abnormal sperm with reduced motility, and it has been investigated as a potential male contraceptive drug.

== See also ==
- JQ1
- TDI-11861
- YCT529
