= HNRPUL1 =

Protein-coding gene in the species Homo sapiens

HNRNPUL1
Available structures
PDB	Ortholog search: PDBe RCSB
PDB	List of PDB id codes 1ZRJ

Identifiers
- Aliases: HNRNPUL1, E1B-AP5, E1BAP5, HNRPUL1, heterogeneous nuclear ribonucleoprotein U like 1
- External IDs: OMIM: 605800; MGI: 2443517; HomoloGene: 31419; GeneCards: HNRNPUL1; OMA:HNRNPUL1 - orthologs

Gene location (Human)
Chr.	Chromosome 19 (human)
Band	19q13.2	Start	41,262,496 bp
Band	19q13.2	End	41,307,787 bp

Gene location (Mouse)
Chr.	Chromosome 7 (mouse)
Band	7|7 A3	Start	25,420,590 bp
Band	7|7 A3	End	25,454,182 bp
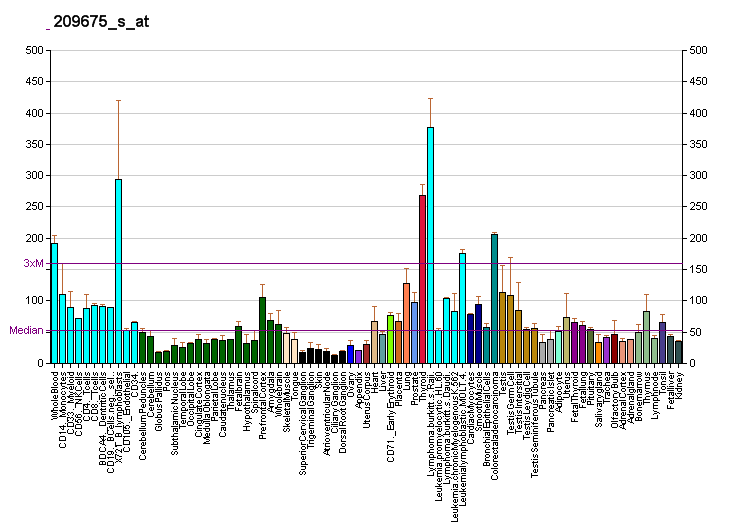

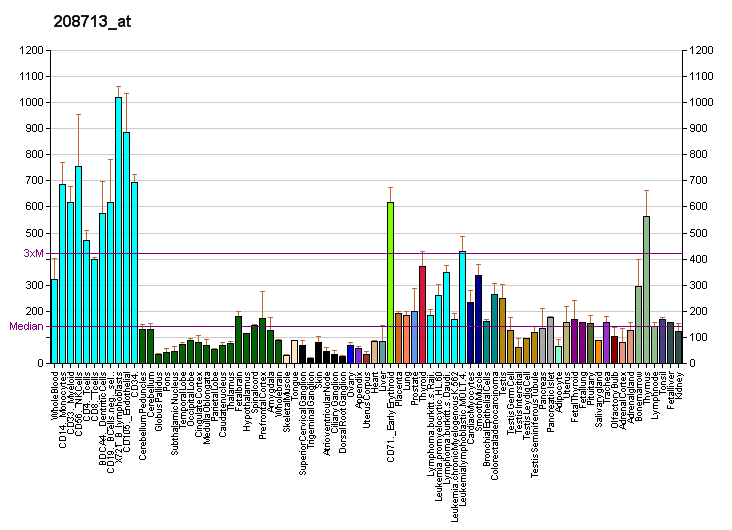
RNA expression pattern
Bgee	Human / Mouse (ortholog); Top expressed in: ventricular zone; ganglionic eminence; sural nerve; gastric mucosa; left ovary; stromal cell of endometrium; right ovary; bone marrow cell; body of uterus; popliteal artery / Top expressed in: internal carotid artery; Gonadal ridge; external carotid artery; genital tubercle; molar; mesenteric lymph nodes; Rostral migratory stream; tail of embryo; conjunctival fornix; ventricular zone; More reference expression data
BioGPS	More reference expression data
Gene ontology
Molecular function	enzyme binding; protein binding; RNA binding
Cellular component	nucleus; nucleoplasm
Biological process	mRNA splicing, via spliceosome; response to virus; RNA processing; regulation of transcription, DNA-templated; transcription, DNA-templated
Sources:Amigo / QuickGO
Orthologs
Species	Human	Mouse
Entrez	11100	232989
Ensembl	ENSG00000105323	ENSMUSG00000040725
UniProt	Q9BUJ2	Q8VDM6
RefSeq (mRNA)	NM_001301016; NM_007040; NM_144732; NM_144733; NM_144734 NM_001321208; NM_001321211	NM_144922; NM_178089; NM_001360789
RefSeq (protein)	NP_001287945; NP_001308137; NP_001308140; NP_008971; NP_653333	NP_659171; NP_835190; NP_001347718
Location (UCSC)	Chr 19: 41.26 – 41.31 Mb	Chr 7: 25.42 – 25.45 Mb
PubMed search
- Wikidata
View/Edit Human	View/Edit Mouse

Heterogeneous nuclear ribonucleoprotein U-like protein 1 is a protein that in humans is encoded by the HNRNPUL1 gene.

This gene encodes a nuclear RNA-binding protein of the heterogeneous nuclear ribonucleoprotein (hnRNP) family. This protein binds specifically to adenovirus E1B-55kDa oncoprotein. It may play an important role in nucleocytoplasmic RNA transport, and its function is modulated by E1B-55kDa in adenovirus-infected cells. HNRPUL1 also participates in ATR protein kinase signalling pathways during adenovirus infection. Two transcript variants encoding different isoforms have been found for this gene. Additional variants have also been found, but their full-length natures have not been determined.

== Interactions ==
HNRPUL1 has been shown to interact with BRD7 and PRMT2.
