= STK33 =

Human DNA protein

Identifiers
- Aliases: STK33, serine/threonine kinase 33
- External IDs: OMIM: 607670; MGI: 2152419; HomoloGene: 75307; GeneCards: STK33; OMA:STK33 - orthologs

Gene location (Human)
| Chr. | Chromosome 11 (human) |
| Band | 11p15.4 | Start | 8,391,868 bp |
| Band | 11p15.4 | End | 8,594,289 bp |

Gene location (Mouse)
| Chr. | Chromosome 7 (mouse) |
| Band | 7 E3|7 57.21 cM | Start | 108,878,430 bp |
| Band | 7 E3|7 57.21 cM | End | 109,038,288 bp |
RNA expression pattern
| Bgee | Human / Mouse (ortholog); Top expressed in: right uterine tube; anterior pituitary; bronchial epithelial cell; left testis; right testis; olfactory zone of nasal mucosa; sperm; gonad; ventricular zone; testicle / Top expressed in: spermatid; spermatocyte; seminiferous tubule; epithelium of bronchiole; spermatogonium; medial ganglionic eminence; embryo; embryo; Jacobson's organ; outer plexiform layer; More reference expression data |
| BioGPS | n/a |
Gene ontology
| Molecular function | transferase activity; nucleotide binding; protein kinase activity; ATP binding; kinase activity; protein serine/threonine kinase activity |
| Cellular component | cytoplasm; perinuclear region of cytoplasm; intracellular anatomical structure; nucleus |
| Biological process | protein autophosphorylation; protein phosphorylation; phosphorylation; peptidyl-serine phosphorylation; peptidyl-threonine phosphorylation; intracellular signal transduction; signal transduction in response to DNA damage; mitotic DNA damage checkpoint signaling |
Sources:Amigo / QuickGO
Orthologs
| Species | Human | Mouse |
| Entrez | 65975 | 117229 |
| Ensembl | ENSG00000130413 | ENSMUSG00000031027 |
| UniProt | Q9BYT3 | Q924X7 |
| RefSeq (mRNA) | NM_001289058; NM_001289059; NM_001289061; NM_030906; NM_001352387 NM_001352388; NM_001352389; NM_001352390; NM_001352391; NM_001352392; NM_001352393; NM_001352394; NM_001352395; NM_001352396; NM_001352397; NM_001352398; NM_001352399 | NM_054103; NM_001355145 |
| RefSeq (protein) | NP_001275987; NP_001275988; NP_001275990; NP_112168; NP_001339316 NP_001339317; NP_001339318; NP_001339319; NP_001339320; NP_001339321; NP_001339322; NP_001339323; NP_001339324; NP_001339325; NP_001339326; NP_001339327; NP_001339328 | NP_473444; NP_001342074 |
| Location (UCSC) | Chr 11: 8.39 – 8.59 Mb | Chr 7: 108.88 – 109.04 Mb |
| PubMed search |
- Wikidata
| View/Edit Human | View/Edit Mouse |

Serine/threonine kinase 33 is a protein that in humans is encoded by the STK33 gene. It is a member of the serine/threonine-specific protein kinase family of enzymes.

STK33 was identified as a synthetic lethal gene in KRAS-dependent cell lines.

STK33 has been considered as a target for reversible male contraceptives and the inhibitor CDD-2807 has been tested successfully in mice.
