= Zavabresib =

Investigational drug

Clinical data
- Other names: OPN-2853; PLX-2853; PLX124-01

Identifiers
- IUPAC name: 4-[6-(3,5-dimethyl-1,2-oxazol-4-yl)-1-(1,1-dipyridin-2-ylethyl)pyrrolo[3,2-b]pyridin-3-yl]benzoic acid
- CAS Number: 2089390-09-8
- PubChem CID: 126689208
- ChemSpider: 129953265
- UNII: WY57S8PGY9
- KEGG: D13358

Chemical and physical data
- Formula: C_{31}H_{25}N_{5}O_{3}
- Molar mass: 515.573 g·mol^{−1}
- 3D model (JSmol): Interactive image
- SMILES: CC1=C(C(=NO1)C)C2=CC3=C(C(=CN3C(C)(C4=CC=CC=N4)C5=CC=CC=N5)C6=CC=C(C=C6)C(=O)O)N=C2
- InChI: InChI=InChI=1S/C31H25N5O3/c1-19-28(20(2)39-35-19)23-16-25-29(34-17-23)24(21-10-12-22(13-11-21)30(37)38)18-36(25)31(3,26-8-4-6-14-32-26)27-9-5-7-15-33-27/h4-18H,1-3H3,(H,37,38); Key:LLUTURRCWNCHPC-UHFFFAOYSA-N

Zavabresib is an investigational new drug that is being evaluated by Plexxikon/Opna Bio for the treatment of myelofibrosis. It is a BRD4 protein inhibitor.
