= PRMT2 =

Protein-coding gene in the species Homo sapiens

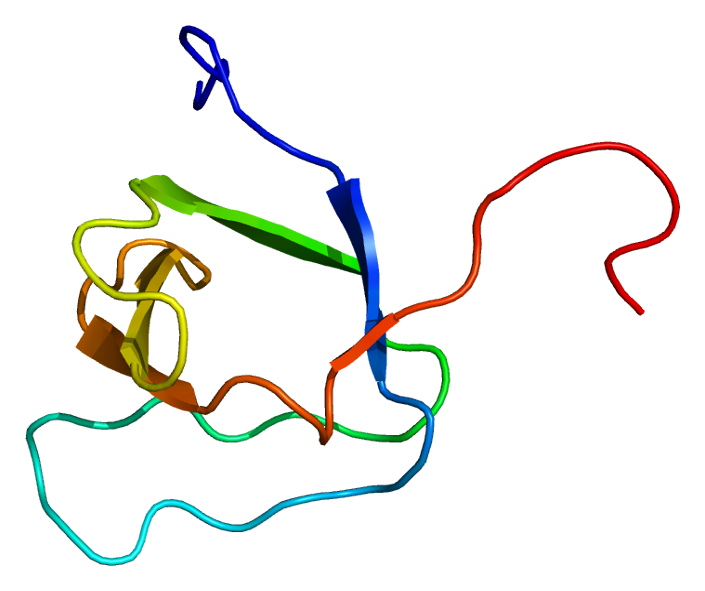

Identifiers
- Aliases: PRMT2, HRMT1L1, protein arginine methyltransferase 2
- External IDs: OMIM: 601961; MGI: 1316652; GeneCards: PRMT2
Available structures
PDB	Ortholog search: PDBe RCSB
PDB	List of PDB id codes 1X2P
Enzyme activity
EC #	BRENDA	ExPASy	KEGG	MetaCyc
2.1.1.319	↗	↗	↗	↗
2.1.1.321	↗	↗	↗	↗

Gene location (Human)
Chr.	Chromosome 21 (human)
Band	21q22.3	Start	46,635,595 bp
Band	21q22.3	End	46,665,124 bp

Gene location (Mouse)
Chr.	Chromosome 10 (mouse)
Band	10 C1|10 38.74 cM	Start	76,043,056 bp
Band	10 C1|10 38.74 cM	End	76,073,699 bp
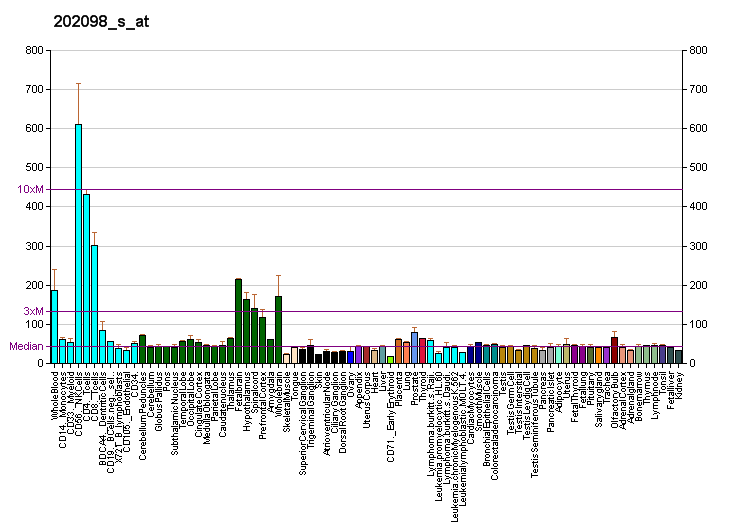

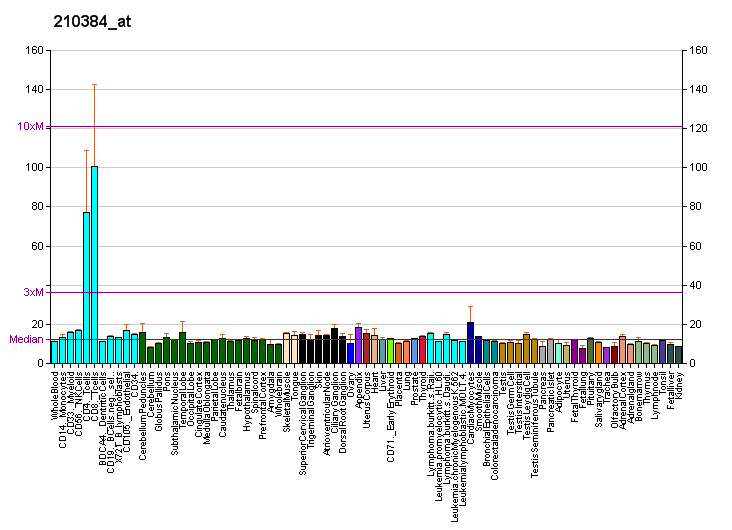
RNA expression pattern
Bgee	Human / Mouse (ortholog); Top expressed in: C1 segment; right coronary artery; ganglionic eminence; tibial nerve; popliteal artery; tibial arteries; granulocyte; thoracic aorta; ascending aorta; ventricular zone / Top expressed in: hypothalamus; neural tube; mesencephalon; rhombencephalon; dentate gyrus of hippocampal formation granule cell; ganglionic eminence; hippocampus proper; placenta; olfactory bulb; lung; More reference expression data
BioGPS	More reference expression data
Gene ontology
Molecular function	methyltransferase activity; transferase activity; histone methyltransferase activity; protein homodimerization activity; progesterone receptor binding; transcription coactivator activity; signal transducer activity; thyroid hormone receptor binding; protein binding; androgen receptor binding; peroxisome proliferator activated receptor binding; retinoic acid receptor binding; estrogen receptor binding; protein-arginine N-methyltransferase activity; histone-arginine N-methyltransferase activity; protein-arginine omega-N asymmetric methyltransferase activity; protein-containing complex binding
Cellular component	cytoplasm; cytosol; Rb-E2F complex; nucleoplasm; nucleolus; nucleus
Biological process	developmental cell growth; negative regulation of G1/S transition of mitotic cell cycle; positive regulation of transcription, DNA-templated; methylation; positive regulation of apoptotic process; regulation of androgen receptor signaling pathway; histone methylation; negative regulation of transcription, DNA-templated; negative regulation of NF-kappaB transcription factor activity; signal transduction; protein methylation; histone arginine methylation; peptidyl-arginine N-methylation; peptidyl-arginine methylation, to asymmetrical-dimethyl arginine; regulation of transcription, DNA-templated
Sources:Amigo / QuickGO
Orthologs
Databases	NCBI: entry; OMA: entry
Species	Human	Mouse
Entrez	3275	15468
Ensembl	ENSG00000160310	ENSMUSG00000020230
UniProt	P55345	Q9R144
RefSeq (mRNA)	NM_001242864; NM_001242865; NM_001242866; NM_001286676; NM_001286677 NM_001286678; NM_001535; NM_206962	NM_001077638; NM_133182; NM_001302965
RefSeq (protein)	NP_001229793; NP_001229794; NP_001229795; NP_001273605; NP_001273606 NP_001273607; NP_001526; NP_996845	n/a
Location (UCSC)	Chr 21: 46.64 – 46.67 Mb	Chr 10: 76.04 – 76.07 Mb
PubMed search
- Wikidata
View/Edit Human	View/Edit Mouse

Protein arginine N-methyltransferase 2 is an enzyme that in humans is encoded by the PRMT2 gene.

== Functions ==
The enzyme methylates final nitrogen atom of arginine residue in some proteins. It transfers two methyl groups from S-adenosyl-L-methionine.

== Interactions ==
PRMT2 has been shown to interact with Estrogen receptor alpha and HNRPUL1.
