= Pelabresib =

Chemical compound

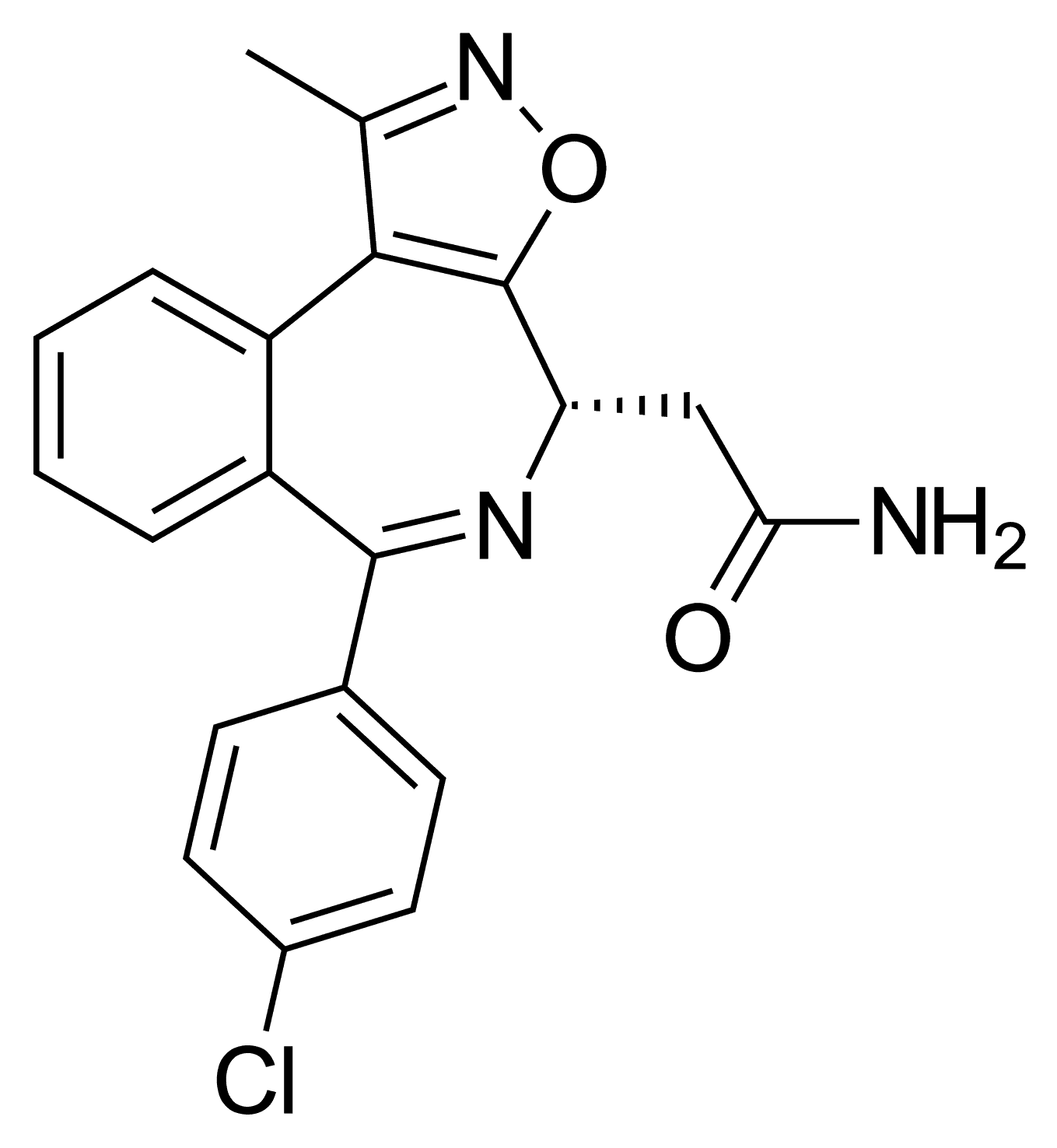

Names
- IUPAC name 2-[(4S)-6-(4-chlorophenyl)-1-methyl-4H-[1,2]oxazolo[5,4-d][2]benzazepin-4-yl]acetamide
- Other names CPI-0610

Identifiers
CAS Number	anhydrous: 1380087-89-7; monohydrate: 1845726-14-8
3D model (JSmol)	anhydrous: Interactive image; monohydrate: Interactive image
ChEBI	anhydrous: CHEBI:189653
ChEMBL	anhydrous: ChEMBL4303404
ChemSpider	anhydrous: 32738784
DrugBank	anhydrous: DB17129
IUPHAR/BPS	anhydrous: 9120
KEGG	monohydrate: D12266
PubChem CID	anhydrous: 57389999; monohydrate: 118591411
UNII	anhydrous: U4017GUQ06; monohydrate: 306QR91I9R
CompTox Dashboard (EPA)	anhydrous: DTXSID201022544
- InChI: InChI=1S/C20H16ClN3O2/c1-11-18-14-4-2-3-5-15(14)19(12-6-8-13(21)9-7-12)23-16(10-17(22)25)20(18)26-24-11/h2-9,16H,10H2,1H3,(H2,22,25)/t16-/m0/s1 Key: GCWIQUVXWZWCLE-INIZCTEOSA-N; monohydrate: InChI=1S/C20H16ClN3O2.H2O/c1-11-18-14-4-2-3-5-15(14)19(12-6-8-13(21)9-7-12)23-16(10-17(22)25)20(18)26-24-11;/h2-9,16H,10H2,1H3,(H2,22,25);1H2/t16-;/m0./s1 Key: LXMGXMQQJNULPR-NTISSMGPSA-N
- SMILES: anhydrous: CC1=NOC2=C1C3=CC=CC=C3C(=N[C@H]2CC(=O)N)C4=CC=C(C=C4)Cl; monohydrate: CC1=NOC2=C1C3=CC=CC=C3C(=N[C@H]2CC(=O)N)C4=CC=C(C=C4)Cl.O

Pharmacology
ATC code	L01XX84 (WHO)
- Except where otherwise noted, data are given for materials in their standard state (at 25 °C [77 °F], 100 kPa). Infobox references

Pelabresib (CPI-0610; PELA) is an investigational oral small-molecule drug designed to inhibit bromodomain and extra-terminal domain (BET)-mediated gene transcription involved in myelofibrosis pathogenesis.

== Comparison with other therapies ==
A phase one study of pelabresib in patients with relapsed/refractory lymphomas found pelabresib is capable of BET target gene suppression in an exposure-dependent manner with an acceptable safety profile leading to the recommended phase II dose of the 125 mg tablet once daily.

In MANIFEST-2, a phase three, randomized, blinded study compares pelabresib and ruxolitinib with placebo and ruxolitinib in myelofibrosis patients that have not been previously treated with Janus kinase inhibitors (JAKi).

NCT02158858, a phase one/two open-label, sequential dose escalation study of pelabresib in patients with previously treated acute leukemia, myelodysplastic syndrome, myelodysplastic/myeloproliferative neoplasms, and myelofibrosis is ongoing.

A third study, NCT06401356, is ongoing to provide continued access to treatment with pelabresib for patients who previously received pelabresib in a parent study and to continue collecting safety and efficacy information, such as a patient's leukemia-free survival and overall survival status during and after the treatment is ended.
