= TDI-11861 =

Chemical compound

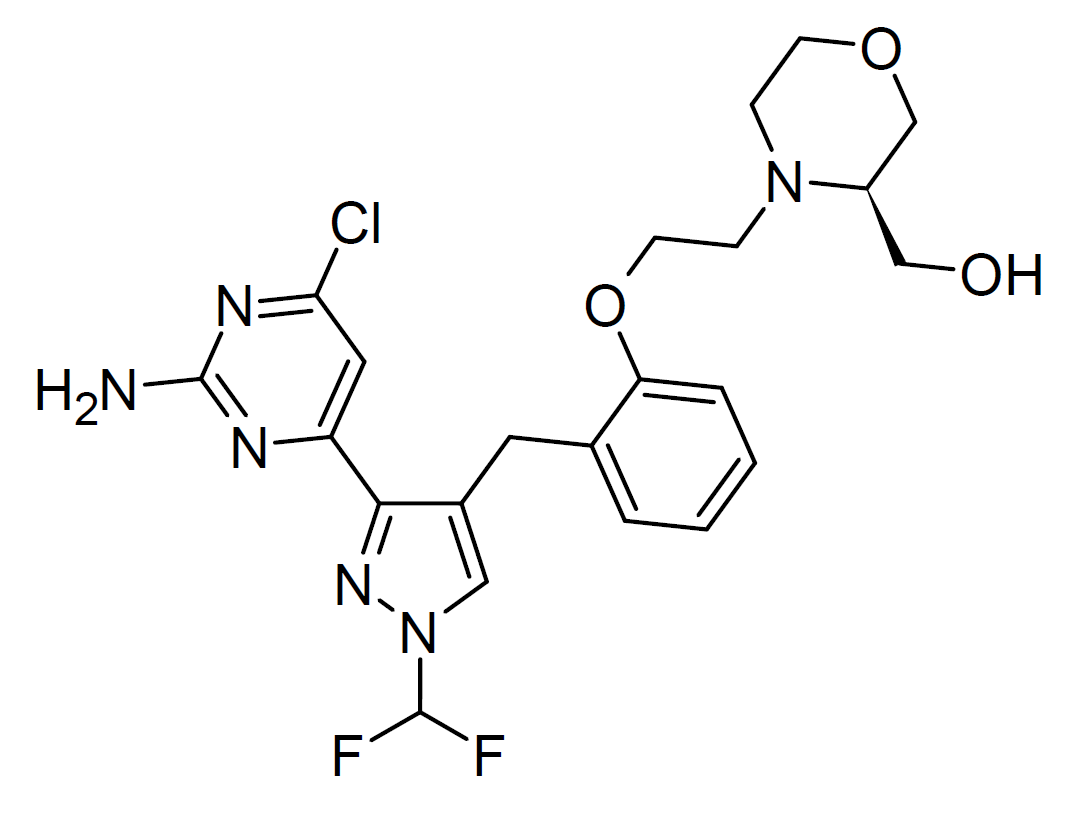

Identifiers
- IUPAC name: [(3R)-4-[2-[2-[[3-(2-amino-6-chloropyrimidin-4-yl)-1-(difluoromethyl)pyrazol-4-yl]methyl]phenoxy]ethyl]morpholin-3-yl]methanol
- CAS Number: 2857049-72-8
- PubChem CID: 166101565

Chemical and physical data
- Formula: C_{22}H_{25}ClF_{2}N_{6}O_{3}
- Molar mass: 494.93 g·mol^{−1}
- 3D model (JSmol): Interactive image
- SMILES: C1COC[C@H](N1CCOC2=CC=CC=C2CC3=CN(N=C3C4=CC(=NC(=N4)N)Cl)C(F)F)CO
- InChI: InChI=1S/C22H25ClF2N6O3/c23-19-10-17(27-22(26)28-19)20-15(11-31(29-20)21(24)25)9-14-3-1-2-4-18(14)34-8-6-30-5-7-33-13-16(30)12-32/h1-4,10-11,16,21,32H,5-9,12-13H2,(H2,26,27,28)/t16-/m1/s1; Key:XVGSKZXXLKUEIO-MRXNPFEDSA-N

TDI-11861 is a chemical compound which acts as a potent and selective inhibitor of soluble adenylyl cyclase (sAC). In animal studies it reversibly inhibits sperm motility, producing temporary infertility without hormonal side effects. While TDI-11861 is at an early developmental stage and is unlikely to be developed for medical uses in humans itself, it represents an important proof of concept which may potentially lead to the development of future male contraceptive drugs.

== See also ==
- CDD-2807
- JQ1
- YCT529
