= Bromodomain-containing protein 3 =

Protein-coding gene in the species Homo sapiens

BRD3
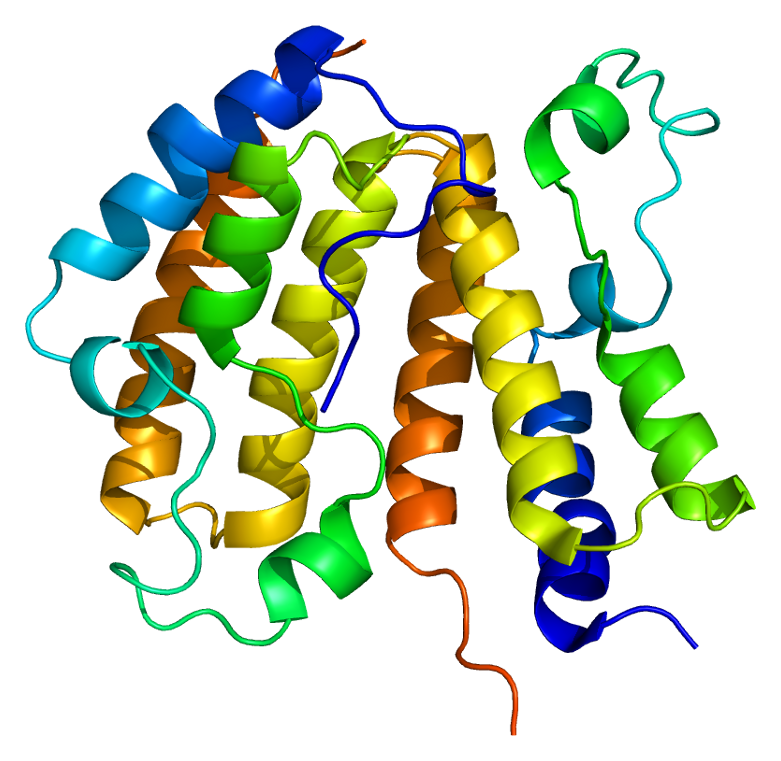

Identifiers
- Aliases: BRD3, ORFX, RING3L, bromodomain containing 3
- External IDs: OMIM: 601541; MGI: 1914632; GeneCards: BRD3
Available structures
PDB	Ortholog search: PDBe RCSB
PDB	List of PDB id codes 2E7N, 2NXB, 2OO1, 2YW5, 3S91, 3S92, 5HFR, 5A7C, 5HJC

Gene location (Human)
Chr.	Chromosome 9 (human)
Band	9q34.2	Start	134,030,305 bp
Band	9q34.2	End	134,068,535 bp

Gene location (Mouse)
Chr.	Chromosome 2 (mouse)
Band	2|2 A3	Start	27,335,591 bp
Band	2|2 A3	End	27,397,674 bp
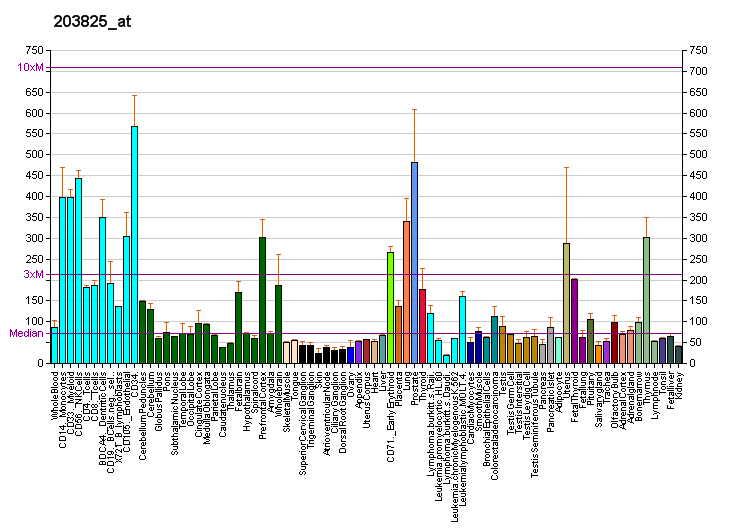

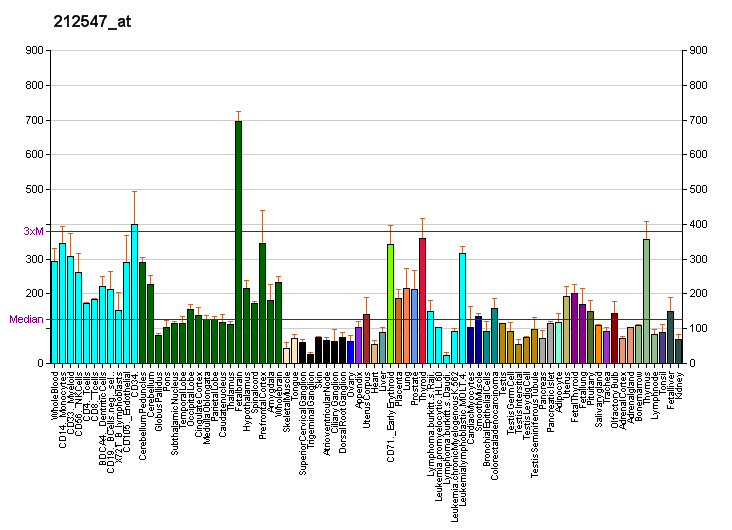
RNA expression pattern
Bgee	Human / Mouse (ortholog); Top expressed in: nipple; internal globus pallidus; optic nerve; oocyte; inferior ganglion of vagus nerve; pylorus; secondary oocyte; ventral tegmental area; dorsal motor nucleus of vagus nerve; external globus pallidus / Top expressed in: genital tubercle; tail of embryo; Rostral migratory stream; cortex of thymus; ganglionic eminence; cumulus cell; ventricular zone; granulocyte; maxillary prominence; mandibular prominence; More reference expression data
BioGPS	More reference expression data
Gene ontology
Molecular function	protein binding; chromatin binding; lysine-acetylated histone binding
Cellular component	nucleus
Biological process	regulation of transcription, DNA-templated; regulation of transcription by RNA polymerase II; transcription, DNA-templated; chromatin organization
Sources:Amigo / QuickGO
Orthologs
Databases	NCBI: entry; OMA: entry
Species	Human	Mouse
Entrez	8019	67382
Ensembl	ENSG00000169925	ENSMUSG00000026918
UniProt	Q15059	Q8K2F0
RefSeq (mRNA)	NM_007371	NM_001113573; NM_001113574; NM_023336
RefSeq (protein)	NP_031397; NP_031397.1	NP_001107045; NP_001107046; NP_075825
Location (UCSC)	Chr 9: 134.03 – 134.07 Mb	Chr 2: 27.34 – 27.4 Mb
PubMed search
- Wikidata
View/Edit Human	View/Edit Mouse

Bromodomain-containing protein 3 (BRD3) also known as RING3-like protein (RING3L) is a protein that in humans is encoded by the BRD3 gene. This gene was identified based on its homology to the gene encoding the RING3 (BRD2) protein, a serine/threonine kinase. The gene maps to 9q34, a region which contains several major histocompatibility complex (MHC) genes.

== Structure ==
BRD3 is a member of the Bromodomain and Extra-Terminal motif (BET) protein family. Like other BET family members it contains two tandem homologous bromodomains and an "Extra-Terminal" motif.

BRD3, similar to BRD2, does not have a long C-terminal domain as BET family proteins BRD4 and BRDT do.

== Function ==
Like other BET protein family members, BRD3 associates with acetylated lysine residues on histones and transcription factors.

BRD3 has been implicated in nucleosome remodeling in the context of transcription. In addition, BRD3 has been shown to interact with RNA molecules and form protein-RNA aggregates.

BRD2 and BRD3 perform overlapping cellular functions.

== Clinical significance ==
Chromosomal translocation of BRD3 with the NUT gene has been implicated in NUT midline carcinoma. BRD3-NUT driven cancers are histopathologically indistinguishable from BRD4-NUT driven cancers, likely because these translocations involve the N-terminal portion bromodomain-containing portion of these proteins which are highly conserved.

Depletion of BRD3 slows growth in cancer models including prostate cancer and medulloblastoma. The effect of BRD3 depletion is milder than that of other BET proteins BRD2 and BRD4 when each is tested in isolation. BET inhibitors target highly conserved BET bromodomains and displace BRD2, BRD3, and BRD4 from chromatin simultaneously. Functional redundancy between BRD2 and BRD3 suggests that their simultaneous disruption of these proteins may be more important than is appreciated by depletion of these proteins individually.
