= NUT carcinoma =

NUT carcinoma (NC)
- Other names: NUT midline carcinoma (NMC)
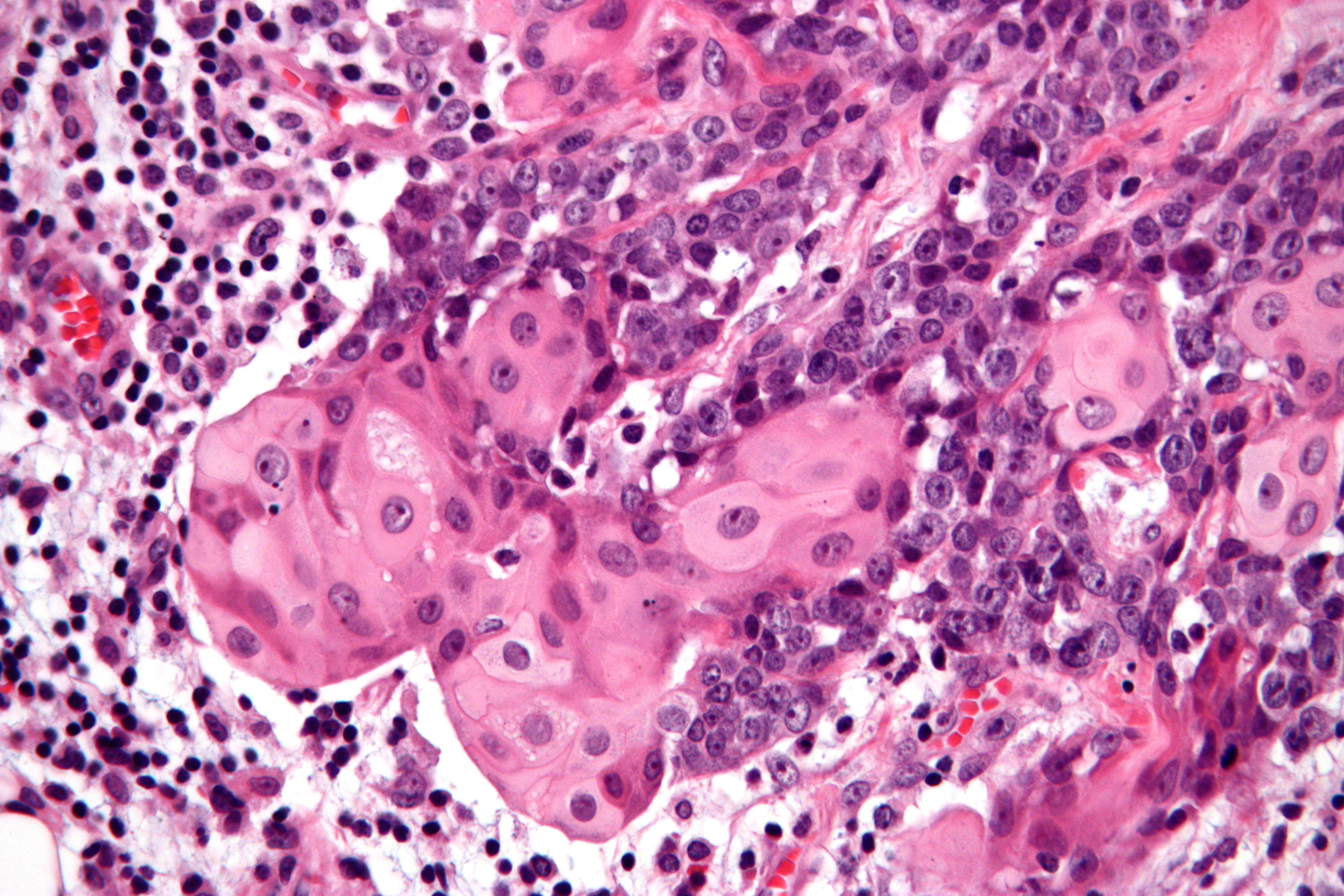
- Micrograph of a NUT carcinoma with the characteristic well-differentiated islands of squamous epithelium. H&E stain.
- Specialty: Oncology

NUT carcinoma (NC; formerly NUT midline carcinoma (NMC)) is a rare genetically defined, very aggressive squamous cell epithelial cancer that usually arises in the midline of the body and is characterized by a chromosomal rearrangement in the nuclear protein in testis gene (i.e. NUTM1 gene). In approximately 75% of cases, the coding sequence of NUTM1 in band 14 on the long (or "q") arm of chromosome 15 is fused to BRD4 or BRD3, which creates a chimeric gene that encodes the BRD-NUT fusion protein. The remaining cases, the fusion of NUTM1 is to an unknown partner gene, usually called NUT-variant.

The name NUT carcinoma was introduced as the carcinoma does not only occur in the body midline; therefore, WHO also changed the name in 2015 in the WHO Classification of Tumours of the Lung, Pleura, Thymus and Heart.

== Signs and symptoms ==
The number of cases per year is likely grossly underestimated. One study suggests the incidence rate is likely around 1,000 cases per year in the United States. The symptoms are similar to other forms of cancer and dependent on the stage. While generalized symptoms (weight loss and fatigue) may be seen, site specific symptoms are also present. If the tumor involves the head and neck region (in about 35%), then pain, a mass, obstructive symptoms, among others, may be experienced. NUT carcinomas are not specific to any tissue type or organ. Common sites include the head, neck and mediastinum. The median age at diagnosis is 16–23 years, but older patients may be affected.

== Diagnosis ==
NC when viewed microscopically, are poorly differentiated carcinomas which show abrupt transitions to islands of well-differentiated squamous epithelium. This tumor pattern is not specific or unique to NUT carcinoma, but this pattern is most suggestive of the diagnosis. The neoplastic cells will show a positive reaction with various cytokeratins, p63, CEA, and CD34 immunohistochemistry.

However, the defining feature of NCs is rearrangement of the NUT gene. Most common is a translocation involving the BRD4 gene and NUT gene (t(15;19)(q13;p13.1)). Therefore, staining with the NUT antibody confirms the diagnosis (although only available in a limited number of laboratories).

=== Differential diagnosis ===
The differential diagnosis is quite wide, but it is important to consider this tumor type when seeing a poorly differentiated tumor that shows abrupt areas of keratinization. Other tumors included in the differential diagnosis are sinonasal undifferentiated carcinomas, Ewing sarcoma/Primitive neuroectodermal tumor, leukemia, rhabdomyosarcoma, and melanoma. When NUT midline carcinoma is seen in the head and neck, the squamous lining of the cavities may be entrapped by the neoplastic cells, and so it is important to document the carcinoma cells in the rest of the tumor by a variety of stains (including cytokeratin or p63). One of the most helpful and characteristic findings is the focal abrupt squamous differentiation, where stratification and gradual differentiation are absent, resembling a Hassall corpuscle of the thymus.

== Treatment ==
Currently, the standard treatment approach is a multimodal approach involving surgery as well as radio-chemotherapy. As the mean survival under this treatment regimen is only 5–7 months, more specific treatment options are under investigation: Specific molecular targeted therapies (including BET inhibitors and histone deacetylase inhibitors (HDACi)) may help to yield growth arrest of the neoplastic cells. Two genetically engineered mouse models (GEMMs) of NC have been reported by the French lab (2023) and Gu lab (2024). These models demonstrate that BRD4-NUT alone drives malignant transformation and spread of NUT carcinoma and will help enable the discovery and development of novel, targeted therapies for NC.

== Prognosis ==
NUT carcinoma is very resistant to standard chemotherapy treatments. The tumor may initially respond to therapy, and then rapid recurrence is experienced. A multimodality approach to treatment is advocated, especially since most patients present with advanced disease. Treatment must be tailored to the individual patient, with several promising new targeted molecular therapies in clinical trials. Overall, there is a mean survival of 6–9 months.

== See also ==
- BET inhibitor
