= BRD7 =

Protein-coding gene in the species Homo sapiens

Identifiers
- Aliases: BRD7, BP75, CELTIX1, NAG4, bromodomain containing 7, SMARCI1
- External IDs: OMIM: 618489; MGI: 1349766; GeneCards: BRD7
Available structures
| PDB | Ortholog search: PDBe RCSB |
| PDB | List of PDB id codes 2I7K |

Gene location (Human)
| Chr. | Chromosome 16 (human) |
| Band | 16q12.1 | Start | 50,313,487 bp |
| Band | 16q12.1 | End | 50,368,988 bp |

Gene location (Mouse)
| Chr. | Chromosome 8 (mouse) |
| Band | 8|8 C3 | Start | 88,331,039 bp |
| Band | 8|8 C3 | End | 88,362,194 bp |
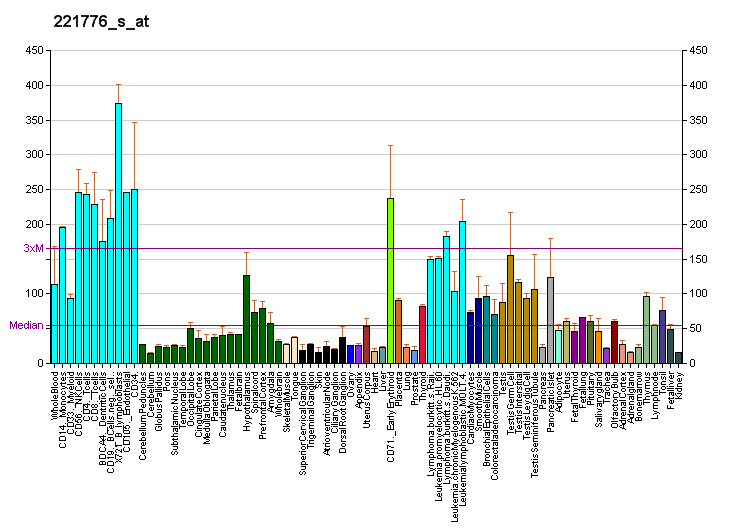
RNA expression pattern
| Bgee | Human / Mouse (ortholog); Top expressed in: sural nerve; ventricular zone; ganglionic eminence; islet of Langerhans; gonad; Achilles tendon; C1 segment; right testis; testicle; popliteal artery / Top expressed in: genital tubercle; tail of embryo; ventricular zone; zygote; cardiac muscle tissue of left ventricle; interventricular septum; muscle of thigh; secondary oocyte; lens; condyle; More reference expression data |
| BioGPS | More reference expression data |
Gene ontology
| Molecular function | transcription coactivator activity; histone binding; p53 binding; transcription factor binding; protein binding; transcription corepressor activity; lysine-acetylated histone binding |
| Cellular component | nucleus; nucleoplasm; cytoplasm; cytosol |
| Biological process | regulation of transcription by RNA polymerase II; positive regulation of transcription, DNA-templated; negative regulation of G1/S transition of mitotic cell cycle; cell cycle; negative regulation of transcription, DNA-templated; regulation of transcription, DNA-templated; Wnt signaling pathway; transcription, DNA-templated; negative regulation of cell population proliferation; positive regulation of histone acetylation; regulation of signal transduction by p53 class mediator |
Sources:Amigo / QuickGO
Orthologs
| Databases | NCBI: entry; OMA: entry |
| Species | Human | Mouse |
| Entrez | 29117 | 26992 |
| Ensembl | ENSG00000166164 | ENSMUSG00000031660 |
| UniProt | Q9NPI1 | O88665 |
| RefSeq (mRNA) | NM_001173984; NM_013263 | NM_012047 |
| RefSeq (protein) | NP_001167455; NP_037395 | NP_036177; NP_001363942; NP_001363943; NP_001363944; NP_001363945 NP_001363946 |
| Location (UCSC) | Chr 16: 50.31 – 50.37 Mb | Chr 8: 88.33 – 88.36 Mb |
| PubMed search |
- Wikidata
| View/Edit Human | View/Edit Mouse |

Bromodomain-containing protein 7 is a protein that in humans is encoded by the BRD7 gene.

== Interactions ==
BRD7 has been shown to interact with IRF2 and HNRPUL1.

== Azoospermia ==
BRD7 protein is a transcription regulator that is normally highly expressed in the testis, particularly in meiotic pachytene and diplotene spermatocytes and in round spermatids. However, in the testes of patients exhibiting spermatogenesis arrest and azoospermia, BRD7 protein expression is observed to be absent or reduced. Homozygous knockout mice [BRD7(-/-)] are infertile and have increased DNA damage and apoptosis in their germline.
