= BRD2 =

Protein-coding gene in the species Homo sapiens

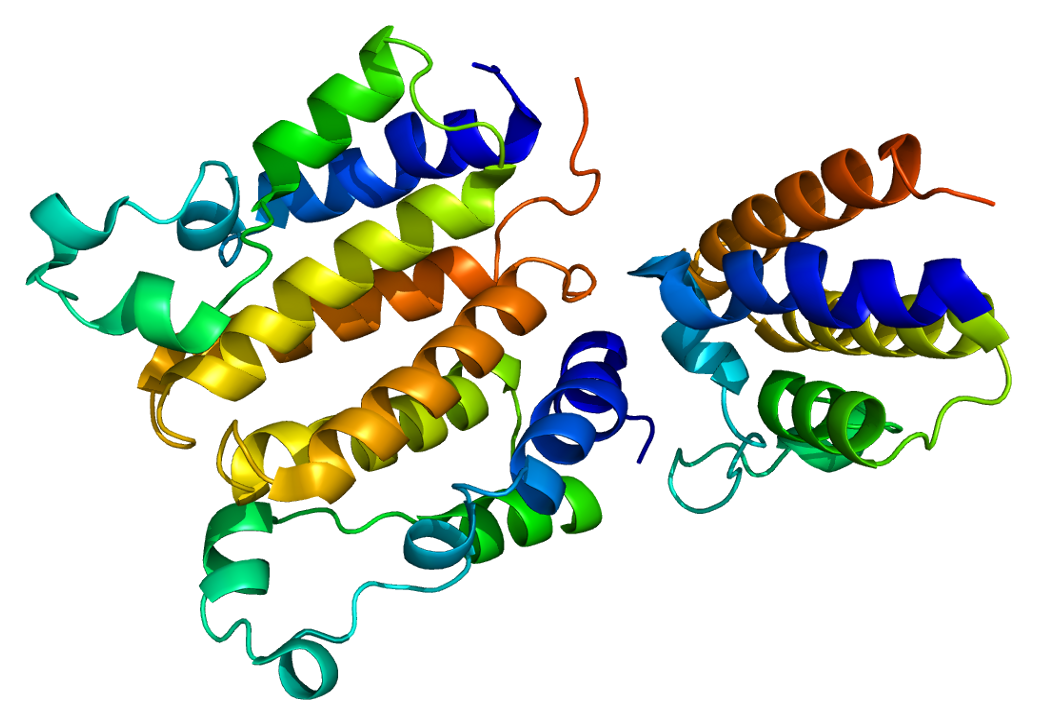

Identifiers
- Aliases: BRD2, D6S113E, FSH, FSRG1, NAT, RING3, RNF3, O27.1.1, bromodomain containing 2, BRD2-IT1
- External IDs: OMIM: 601540; MGI: 99495; GeneCards: BRD2
Available structures
PDB	Ortholog search: PDBe RCSB
PDB	List of PDB id codes 1X0J, 2DVQ, 2DVR, 2DVS, 2DVV, 2E3K, 2G4A, 2YDW, 2YEK, 3AQA, 3ONI, 4A9E, 4A9F, 4A9H, 4A9I, 4A9J, 4A9M, 4A9N, 4A9O, 4AKN, 4ALG, 4ALH, 4J1P, 4MR5, 4MR6, 4QEU, 4QEV, 4QEW, 4UYF, 4UYG, 4UYH, 5BT5, 5DFD, 5HEM, 5DFB, 5HEL, 5HFQ, 5HEN, 5DFC, 5IG6, 5IBN, 5DW1

Gene location (Human)
Chr.	Chromosome 6 (human)
Band	6p21.32	Start	32,968,594 bp
Band	6p21.32	End	32,981,505 bp

Gene location (Mouse)
Chr.	Chromosome 17 (mouse)
Band	17 B1|17 17.98 cM	Start	34,330,997 bp
Band	17 B1|17 17.98 cM	End	34,341,608 bp
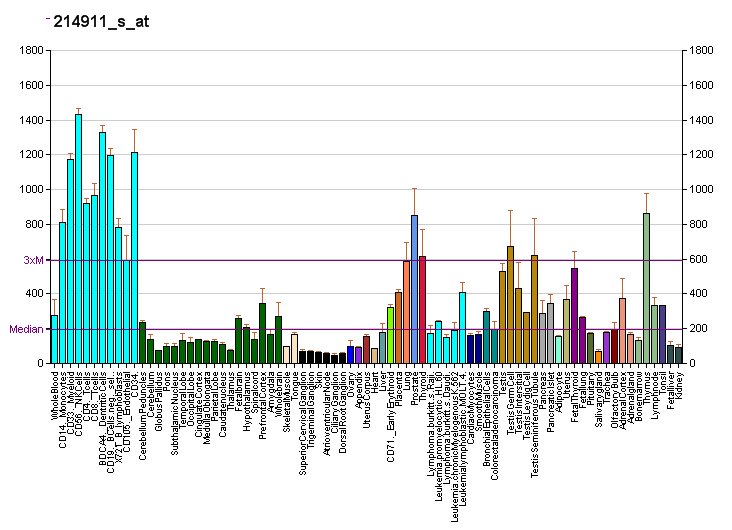

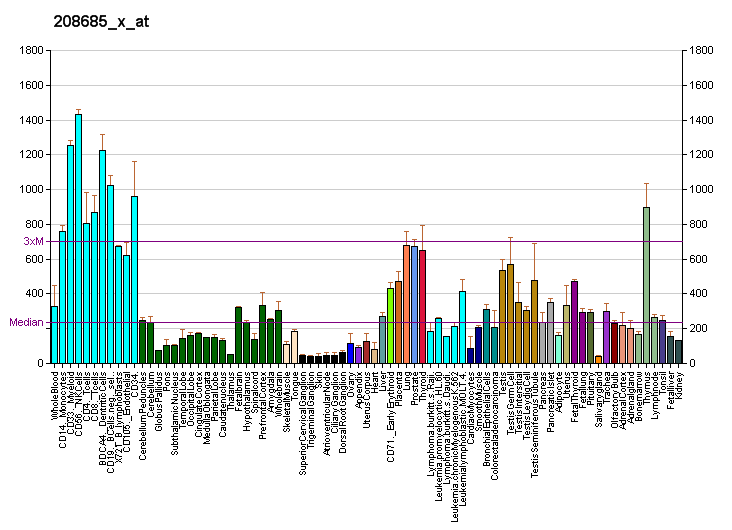

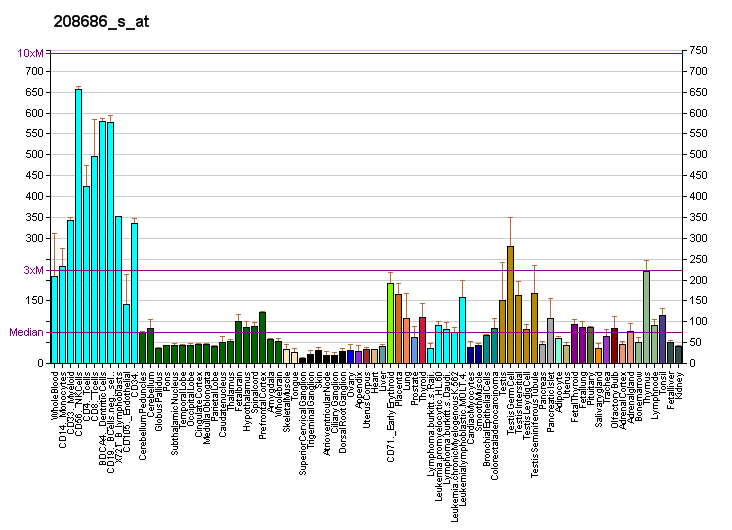
RNA expression pattern
Bgee	Human / Mouse (ortholog); Top expressed in: ventricular zone; granulocyte; ganglionic eminence; left lobe of thyroid gland; right testis; right lobe of thyroid gland; left testis; pituitary gland; anterior pituitary; cerebellar hemisphere / Top expressed in: tail of embryo; genital tubercle; Rostral migratory stream; lacrimal gland; internal carotid artery; neural layer of retina; ventricular zone; yolk sac; external carotid artery; granulocyte; More reference expression data
BioGPS	More reference expression data
Gene ontology
Molecular function	chromatin binding; protein binding; lysine-acetylated histone binding
Cellular component	cytoplasm; nucleus; nucleoplasm; nuclear speck
Biological process	regulation of transcription by RNA polymerase II; nucleosome assembly; regulation of transcription, DNA-templated; transcription, DNA-templated; spermatogenesis; chromatin organization; viral process
Sources:Amigo / QuickGO
Orthologs
Databases	NCBI: entry; OMA: entry
Species	Human	Mouse
Entrez	6046	14312
Ensembl	ENSG00000215077; ENSG00000234507; ENSG00000230678; ENSG00000204256; ENSG00000235307 ENSG00000236227; ENSG00000234704	ENSMUSG00000024335
UniProt	P25440	Q7JJ13
RefSeq (mRNA)	NM_001113182; NM_001199455; NM_001199456; NM_001291986; NM_005104	NM_001025387; NM_001204973; NM_010238
RefSeq (protein)	NP_001106653; NP_001186384; NP_001186385; NP_001278915; NP_005095	NP_001191902; NP_034368
Location (UCSC)	Chr 6: 32.97 – 32.98 Mb	Chr 17: 34.33 – 34.34 Mb
PubMed search
- Wikidata
View/Edit Human	View/Edit Mouse

Bromodomain-containing protein 2 is a protein that in humans is encoded by the BRD2 gene. BRD2 is part of the Bromodomain and Extra-Terminal motif (BET) protein family that also contains BRD3, BRD4, and BRDT in mammals

Early descriptions demonstrated that BRD2 gene product is a mitogen-activated kinase which localizes to the nucleus. The gene maps to the major histocompatibility complex (MHC) class II region on chromosome 6p21.3 but sequence comparison suggests that the protein is not involved in the immune response. Homology to the Drosophila gene female sterile homeotic suggests that this human gene may be part of a signal transduction pathway involved in growth control.

== Functions ==
- BRD2 may have functional overlap with close homolog BRD3.
- BRD2 function is blocked by BET inhibitors.

== Clinical significance ==
- BRD2 has been implicated in cancer.
- BRD2 loss in mice causes obesity without diabetes for unknown reasons.

== Interactions ==
BRD2 has been shown to interact with E2F2, and many transcription factors including GATA1.
