= BRDT =

Protein-coding gene in humans

Identifiers
- Aliases: BRDT, BRD6, CT9, bromodomain testis associated, SPGF21
- External IDs: OMIM: 602144; MGI: 1891374; GeneCards: BRDT
Available structures
PDB	Ortholog search: PDBe RCSB
PDB	List of PDB id codes 2RFJ, 4FLP, 4KCX

Gene location (Human)
Chr.	Chromosome 1 (human)
Band	1p22.1	Start	91,949,343 bp
Band	1p22.1	End	92,014,426 bp

Gene location (Mouse)
Chr.	Chromosome 5 (mouse)
Band	5|5 E5	Start	107,331,159 bp
Band	5|5 E5	End	107,387,058 bp
RNA expression pattern
Bgee	Human / Mouse (ortholog); Top expressed in: left testis; right testis; gonad; testicle; sperm; buccal mucosa cell; oocyte; paraflocculus of cerebellum; placenta; granulocyte / Top expressed in: zygote; secondary oocyte; spermatocyte; seminiferous tubule; spermatid; primary oocyte; olfactory epithelium; lumbar spinal ganglion; Gonadal ridge; female urethra; More reference expression data
BioGPS	n/a
Gene ontology
Molecular function	transcription coactivator activity; histone binding; lysine-acetylated histone binding
Cellular component	nucleus
Biological process	male meiotic nuclear division; positive regulation of transcription involved in meiotic cell cycle; chromatin remodeling; mRNA processing; male meiosis I; cell differentiation; regulation of RNA splicing; meiosis; transcription, DNA-templated; spermatogenesis; RNA splicing; regulation of transcription, DNA-templated; chromatin organization
Sources:Amigo / QuickGO
Orthologs
Databases	NCBI: entry; OMA: entry
Species	Human	Mouse
Entrez	676	114642
Ensembl	ENSG00000137948	ENSMUSG00000029279
UniProt	Q58F21	Q91Y44
RefSeq (mRNA)	NM_001242805; NM_001242806; NM_001242807; NM_001242808; NM_001242810 NM_001726; NM_207189	NM_001079873; NM_054054
RefSeq (protein)	NP_001229734; NP_001229735; NP_001229736; NP_001229737; NP_001229739 NP_001717; NP_997072	NP_001073342; NP_473395
Location (UCSC)	Chr 1: 91.95 – 92.01 Mb	Chr 5: 107.33 – 107.39 Mb
PubMed search
- Wikidata
View/Edit Human	View/Edit Mouse

Bromodomain testis-specific protein is a protein that in humans is encoded by the BRDT gene. It is a member of the Bromodomain and Extra-terminal motif (BET) protein family.

BRDT is similar to the RING3 protein family. It possesses 2 bromodomain motifs and a PEST sequence (a cluster of proline, glutamic acid, serine, and threonine residues), characteristic of proteins that undergo rapid intracellular degradation. The bromodomain is found in proteins that regulate transcription. Two transcript variants encoding the same protein have been found for this gene.

The use of three different mouse models (Brdt knock-out mice, mice expressing a non-functional Brdt and mice expressing a mutated Brdt lacking its first bromodomain) showed that Brdt drives a meiotic and post-meiotic gene expression program. It also controls the genome-wide post-meiotic genome reorganization that occurs after histone hyperacetylation in elongating spermatids.

== Potential as target of male contraceptive medication ==
BET inhibitors such as JQ1 block the region of BRDT responsible for chromatin binding, and cause a reversible reduction of sperm production, sperm quality, and size of the testis in mice. The mechanism of action of JQ1 could be explained by considering Brdt’s functions as a driver of testis-specific gene expression and post-meiotic chromatin reorganization. As BET inhibitors also inhibit other BET proteins BRD2, BRD3, and BRD4, they are likely to have effects in people beyond temporary male sterility.
