= Bromodomain =

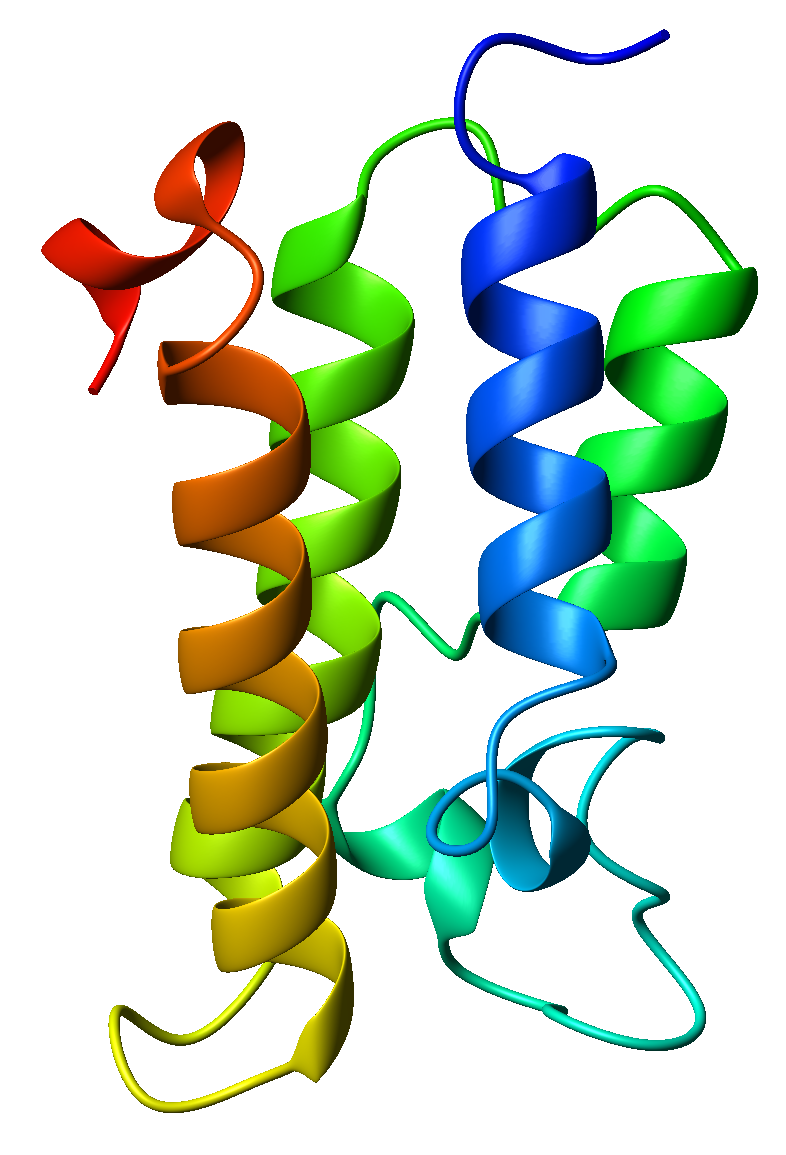
- Ribbon diagram of the GCN5 bromodomain from Saccharomyces cerevisiae, colored from blue (N-terminus) to red (C-terminus).

Identifiers
- Symbol: Bromodomain
- Pfam: PF00439
- InterPro: IPR001487
- SMART: SM00297
- PROSITE: PDOC00550
- SCOP2: 1b91 / SCOPe / SUPFAM
- CDD: cd04369
Available protein structures:
- PDB: 1e6i, 1eqf, 1f68, 1jm4, 1jsp, 1n72, 1wug, 1wum, 1zs5, 2d82 IPR001487 PF00439 (ECOD; PDBsum)
- AlphaFold: IPR001487; PF00439

A bromodomain is an approximately 110 amino acid protein domain that recognizes acetylated lysine residues, such as those on the N-terminal tails of histones. Bromodomains, as the "readers" of lysine acetylation, are responsible in transducing the signal carried by acetylated lysine residues and translating it into various normal or abnormal phenotypes. Their affinity is higher for regions where multiple acetylation sites exist in proximity. This recognition is often a prerequisite for protein-histone association and chromatin remodeling. The domain itself adopts an all-α protein fold, a bundle of four alpha helices each separated by loop regions of variable lengths that form a hydrophobic pocket that recognizes the acetyl lysine.

== Discovery ==
The bromodomain was identified as a novel structural motif by John W. Tamkun and colleagues studying the Drosophila gene Brahma/brm, and showed sequence similarity to genes involved in transcriptional activation. The name "bromodomain" is derived from the relationship of this domain with Brahma and is unrelated to the chemical element bromine.

== Bromodomain-containing proteins ==
Bromodomain-containing proteins can have a wide variety of functions, ranging from histone acetyltransferase activity and chromatin remodeling to transcriptional mediation and co-activation. Of the 43 known in 2015, 11 had two bromodomains, and one protein had 6 bromodomains. Preparation, biochemical analysis, and structure determination of the bromodomain containing proteins have been described in detail.

=== Bromo- and Extra-Terminal domain (BET) family ===
A well-known example of a bromodomain family is the BET (Bromodomain and extraterminal domain) family. Members of this family include BRD2, BRD3, BRD4 and BRDT.

=== Other ===
However proteins such as ASH1L also contain a bromodomain. Dysfunction of BRD proteins has been linked to diseases such as human squamous cell carcinoma and other forms of cancer. Histone acetyltransferases, including EP300 and PCAF, have bromodomains in addition to acetyl-transferase domains.

Not considered part of the BET family (yet containing a bromodomain) are BRD7, and BRD9.

== Role in human disease ==
The role of bromodomains in translating a deregulated cell acetylome into disease phenotypes was recently unveiled by the development of small molecule bromodomain inhibitors. This breakthrough discovery highlighted bromodomain-containing proteins as key players in cancer biology, as well as inflammation and remyelination in multiple sclerosis.

Members of the BET family have been implicated as targets in both human cancer and multiple sclerosis. BET inhibitors have shown therapeutic effects in multiple preclinical models of cancer and are currently in clinical trials in the United States. Their application in multiple sclerosis is still in the preclinical stage.

Small molecule inhibitors of non-BET bromodomain proteins BRD7 and BRD9 have also been developed.

== See also ==
- Chromodomain
- BET inhibitor
- BRD2
- BRD3
- BRD4
- BRD7
- BRD9
- BRDT
