= BRD4 =

Protein-coding gene in the species Homo sapiens

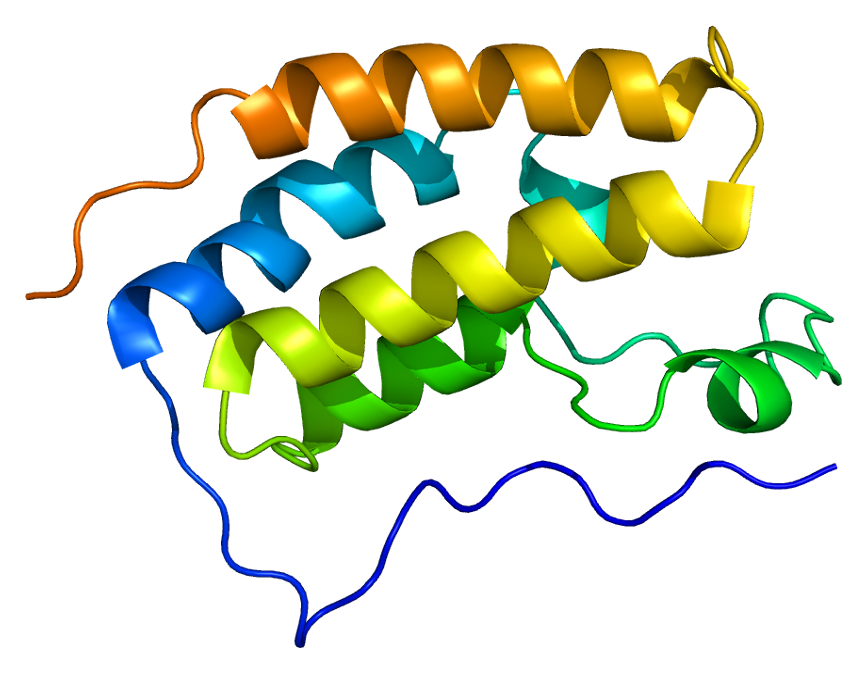

Identifiers
- Aliases: BRD4, CAP, HUNK1, HUNKI, MCAP, bromodomain containing 4
- External IDs: OMIM: 608749; MGI: 1888520; GeneCards: BRD4
Available structures
PDB	Ortholog search: PDBe RCSB
PDB	List of PDB id codes 2I8N, 2LSP, 2MJV, 2OSS, 2OUO, 2YEL, 2YEM, 3MXF, 3P5O, 3SVF, 3SVG, 3U5J, 3U5K, 3U5L, 3UVW, 3UVX, 3UVY, 3UW9, 3ZYU, 4A9L, 4BJX, 4BW1, 4BW2, 4BW3, 4BW4, 4C66, 4C67, 4CFK, 4CFL, 4CL9, 4CLB, 4DON, 4E96, 4F3I, 4GPJ, 4HBV, 4HBW, 4HBX, 4HBY, 4HXK, 4HXL, 4HXM, 4HXN, 4HXO, 4HXP, 4HXR, 4HXS, 4IOO, 4IOQ, 4IOR, 4J0R, 4J0S, 4J3I, 4KV1, 4KV4, 4LR6, 4LRG, 4LYI, 4LYS, 4LYW, 4LZR, 4LZS, 4MEN, 4MEO, 4MEP, 4MEQ, 4MR3, 4MR4, 4NQM, 4NR8, 4NUC, 4NUD, 4NUE, 4O70, 4O71, 4O72, 4O74, 4O75, 4O76, 4O77, 4O78, 4O7A, 4O7B, 4O7C, 4O7E, 4O7F, 4OGI, 4OGJ, 4PCE, 4PCI, 4PS5, 4QB3, 4QR3, 4QR4, 4QR5, 4QZS, 4UIX, 4UIZ, 4UYD, 4WIV, 4XY9, 4XYA, 4Z1Q, 4Z1S, 4Z93, 5A5S, 5A85, 5BT4, 5D3T, 5D3S, 5D3H, 5D3J, 5CTL, 4WHW, 5D3R, 4X2I, 5CPE, 5CRZ, 4YH3, 4ZC9, 5EI4, 5D3P, 5CQT, 5D3L, 5EIS, 5CRM, 5D0C, 5EGU, 5CP5, 5D25, 5CY9, 5COI, 5D26, 4YH4, 5CS8, 5ACY, 5DX4, 5D24, 5HM0, 5HLS, 2N3K, 5JWM, 5DLX, 2NCZ, 2NNU, 5DW2, 2ND1, 4ZW1, 5CFW, 2ND0, 5DLZ

Gene location (Human)
Chr.	Chromosome 19 (human)
Band	19p13.12	Start	15,235,519 bp
Band	19p13.12	End	15,332,545 bp

Gene location (Mouse)
Chr.	Chromosome 17 (mouse)
Band	17 B1|17 17.39 cM	Start	32,196,274 bp
Band	17 B1|17 17.39 cM	End	32,284,722 bp
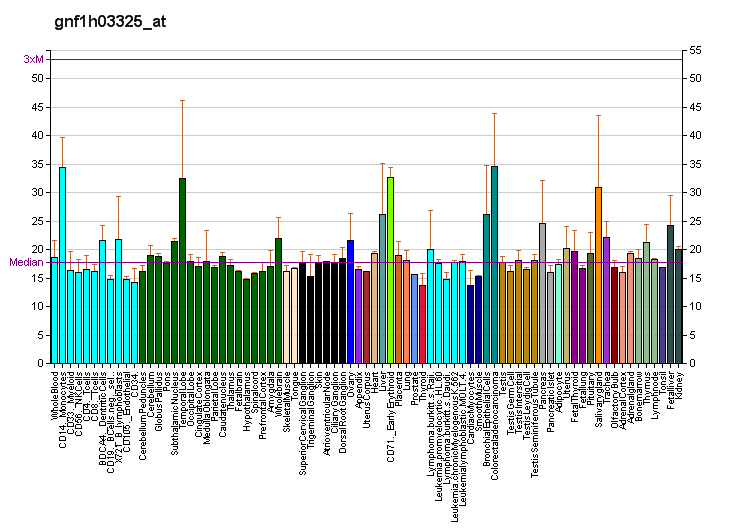

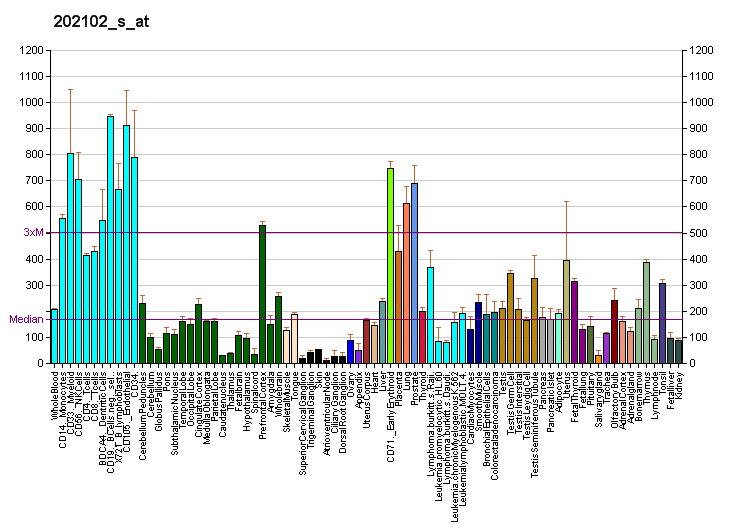
RNA expression pattern
Bgee	Human / Mouse (ortholog); Top expressed in: buccal mucosa cell; sural nerve; tendon of biceps brachii; nipple; internal globus pallidus; pylorus; secondary oocyte; cardia; renal medulla; vena cava / Top expressed in: Rostral migratory stream; genital tubercle; tail of embryo; cumulus cell; blood; zygote; internal carotid artery; ascending aorta; secondary oocyte; aortic valve; More reference expression data
BioGPS	More reference expression data
Gene ontology
Molecular function	p53 binding; chromatin binding; protein binding; lysine-acetylated histone binding; RNA polymerase II complex binding; RNA polymerase II CTD heptapeptide repeat kinase activity; enzyme binding; RNA polymerase II C-terminal domain binding; P-TEFb complex binding
Cellular component	nucleoplasm; chromosome; condensed nuclear chromosome; nucleus; cytosol
Biological process	chromatin remodeling; regulation of transcription, DNA-templated; negative regulation of DNA damage checkpoint; regulation of transcription involved in G1/S transition of mitotic cell cycle; transcription, DNA-templated; cellular response to DNA damage stimulus; regulation of inflammatory response; positive regulation of I-kappaB kinase/NF-kappaB signaling; positive regulation of G2/M transition of mitotic cell cycle; regulation of phosphorylation of RNA polymerase II C-terminal domain; viral process; positive regulation of transcription elongation from RNA polymerase II promoter; positive regulation of transcription by RNA polymerase II; chromatin organization; protein phosphorylation; positive regulation of transcription, DNA-templated; positive regulation of histone H3-K36 trimethylation
Sources:Amigo / QuickGO
Orthologs
Databases	NCBI: entry; OMA: entry
Species	Human	Mouse
Entrez	23476	57261
Ensembl	ENSG00000141867	ENSMUSG00000024002
UniProt	O60885	Q9ESU6
RefSeq (mRNA)	NM_014299; NM_058243; NM_001330384; NM_001379291; NM_001379292	NM_001286630; NM_020508; NM_198094
RefSeq (protein)	NP_001317313; NP_055114; NP_490597; NP_001366220; NP_001366221	NP_001273559; NP_065254; NP_932762
Location (UCSC)	Chr 19: 15.24 – 15.33 Mb	Chr 17: 32.2 – 32.28 Mb
PubMed search
- Wikidata
View/Edit Human	View/Edit Mouse

Bromodomain-containing protein 4 is a protein that in humans is encoded by the BRD4 gene.

BRD4 is a member of the BET (bromodomain and extra terminal domain) family, which also includes BRD2, BRD3, and BRDT. BRD4, similar to other BET family members, contains two bromodomains that recognize acetylated lysine residues. BRD4 also has an extended C-terminal domain with little sequence homology to other BET family members.

== Structure ==
The two bromodomains in BRD4, termed BD1 and BD2, consist of 4 alpha-helices linked by 2 loops. The ET domain structure is made up of 3 alpha-helices and a loop. The C-terminal domain of BRD4 has been implicated in promoting gene transcription through interaction with the transcription elongation factor P-TEFb and RNA polymerase II.

== Function ==
The protein encoded by this gene is homologous to the murine protein MCAP, which associates with chromosomes during mitosis, and to the human BRD2 (RING3) protein, a serine/threonine kinase. Each of these proteins contains two bromodomains, a conserved sequence motif which may be involved in chromatin targeting. This gene has been implicated as the chromosome 19 target of translocation t(15;19)(q13;p13.1), which defines the NUT midline carcinoma. Two alternatively spliced transcript variants have been described.

== Role in cancer ==
Most cases of NUT midline carcinoma involve translocation of the BRD4 gene with NUT genes. BRD4 is often required for expression of Myc and other "tumor driving" oncogenes in hematologic cancers including multiple myeloma, acute myelogenous leukemia and acute lymphoblastic leukaemia.

BRD4 is a major target of BET inhibitors, a class of pharmaceutical drugs currently being evaluated in clinical trials.

== Interactions ==
Notably, BRD4 interacts with P-TEFb via its P-TEFb interaction domain (PID), thereby stimulating its kinase activity and stimulating its phosphorylation of the carboxy-terminal domain (CTD) of RNA polymerase II.

BRD4 has been shown to interact with GATA1, JMJD6, RFC2, RFC3, RFC1, RFC4 and RFC5.

BRD4 has also been implicated in binding with the diacetylated Twist protein, and the disruption of this interaction has been shown to suppress tumorigenesis in basal-like breast cancer.

BRD4 has also been shown to interact with a variety of inhibitors, such as MS417; inhibition of BRD4 with MS417 has been shown to down-regulate NF-κB activity seen in HIV-associated kidney disease. BRD4 also interacts with apabetalone (RVX-208), which is being evaluated for treatment of atherosclerosis and cardiovascular disease.
