= Dipankar Chatterji =

Indian molecular biologist (born 1951)

Padma Shri Dipankar Chatterji
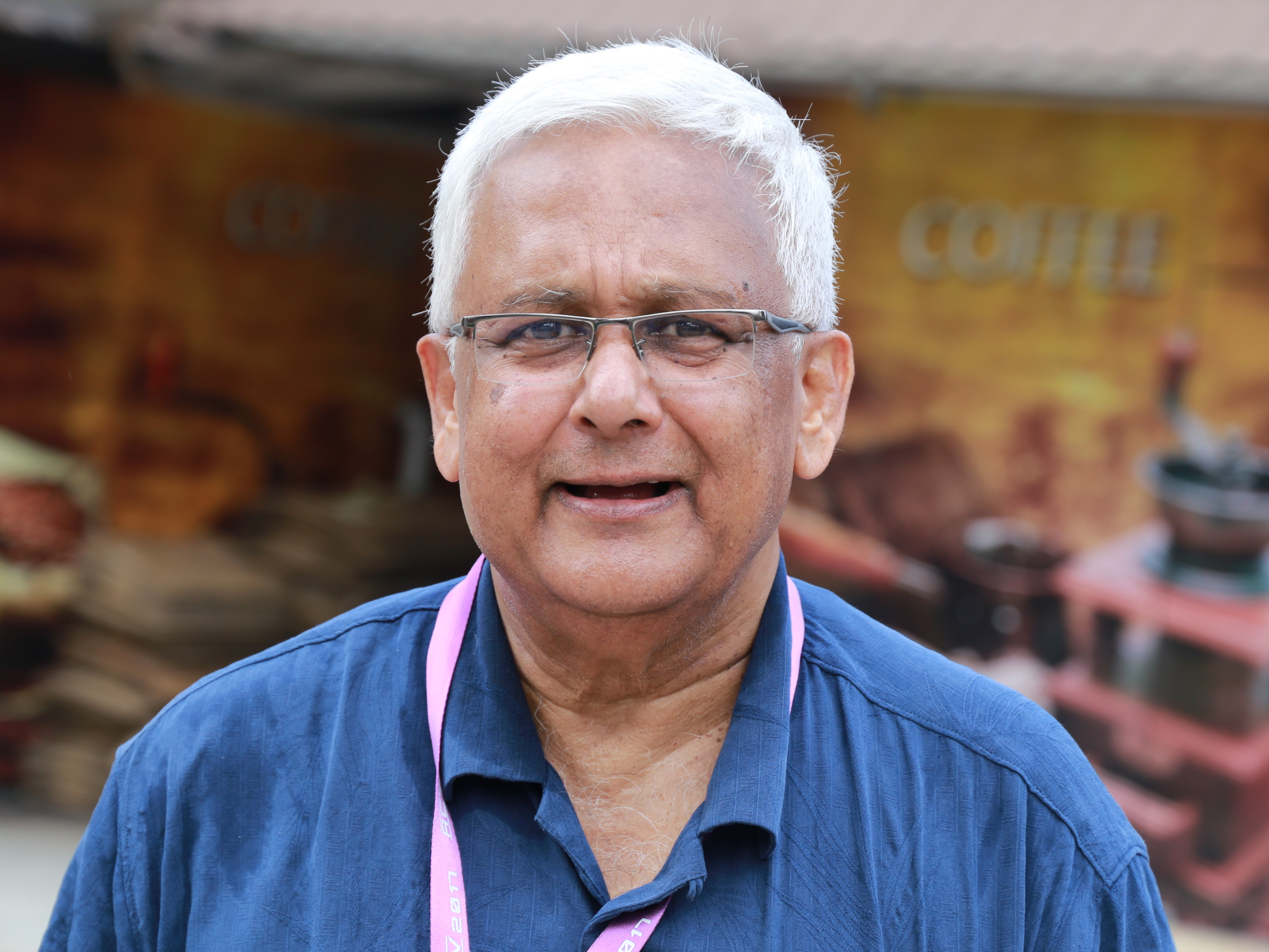
- Born: 20 April 1951 (age 75); West Bengal, India
- Occupation: Molecular biologist
- Years active: 1973–present
- Known for: Research on bacterial transcription and bacterial stress response
- Awards: Padma Shri; Shanti Swarup Bhatnagar Award; Millennium Gold Medal; Ranbaxy Research Award; IISc Alumnus Award
- Website: http://mbu.iisc.ac.in/~dclab/

Dipankar Chatterji (born 20 April 1951) is an Indian molecular biologist and the Honorary Professor at Molecular Biophysics Unit, Indian Institute of Science, a multidisciplinary research institute under the Department of Science and Technology of the Government of India. He is known for his pioneering research on bacterial transcription. He is a recipient of Shanti Swarup Bhatnagar Prize and is an elected fellow of all the major Indian science academies. The Government of India awarded him the fourth highest civilian honour of the Padma Shri, in 2016, for his contributions to science and engineering.

== Biography ==
Chatterji was born on 20 April 1951 in the Indian state of West Bengal and did his graduate and master's degree at Jadavpur University, Kolkata. Subsequently, he completed his doctoral studies under the supervision of S. K. Podder and obtained a doctoral degree (PhD) in molecular biology from the Indian Institute of Science in 1973, after which he started his career as a faculty member at the School of Life Sciences of University of Hyderabad in 1978. This was followed by a stint at Albert Einstein College of Medicine and at Stony Brook University, for his post-doctoral research, and Chatterji returned to India in 1999 to join the Centre for Cellular and Molecular Biology (CCMB), Hyderabad as a research assistant before moving to the Molecular Biophysics Unit of IISc where he became the chair of the Biology and Genetics Unit, a post he held till 2005.

Chatterji, who is known to have done research on bacteria such as Escherichia coli and Mycobacterium tuberculosis as well as the Omega factor with regard to the bacterial transcription mechanism and genome expression, is an adjunct professor of the Indian Institute of Science Education and Research, Kolkata (IISER) and holds the Distinguished Research Professorship of the Institute of Life Sciences, Hyderabad. His researches have been documented by way of over 150 articles published in peer-reviewed international journals and he mentors 31 research scholars in his laboratory. Chatterji is a recipient of the IISc Alumnus Award and is the president of the Indian Institute of Science. He has served as a visiting fellow at National Institute of Genetics, Japan and Johns Hopkins University and has served as a council member of the Indian National Science Academy from 2002 to 2004. Chatterji presided over the council of the Indian Academy of Sciences from 2013 to 2015 besides holding the position of its secretary from 2010 to 2012. Chatterji has also been involved as a member in the advisory committee for 'International Conference on Genome Biology 2019 (ICGB-2019)' organized by the School of Biological Sciences, Madurai Kamaraj University.

== Awards and honors ==
Chatterji, a J. C. Bose National Fellow and a Homi Bhabha Fellow, is also an elected Fellow of the Indian Academy of Sciences (1994), The World Academy of Sciences, Indian National Science Academy (1997) and the National Academy of Sciences, India (1989). He received the Shanti Swarup Bhatnagar Prize, the highest Indian award in the Science and Technology categories, from the Council of Scientific and Industrial Research in 1992. Chatterji is also a recipient of the Millennium Gold Medal (2000) and Ranbaxy Research Award (2001). The Government of India included him in the Republic Day honors list, in 2016, for the civilian award of the Padma Shri.

== See also ==
- Centre for Cellular and Molecular Biology
- Indian Institute of Science Education and Research
- Institute of Life Sciences
