= Transcription (biology) =

Process of copying a segment of DNA into RNA

Transcription is the process of duplicating a segment of DNA into RNA for the purpose of gene expression. Some segments of DNA are transcribed into RNA molecules that can encode proteins, called messenger RNA (mRNA). Other segments of DNA are transcribed into RNA molecules called non-coding RNAs (ncRNAs).

Both DNA and RNA are nucleic acids, composed of nucleotide sequences. During transcription, a DNA sequence is read by an RNA polymerase, which produces a complementary RNA strand called a primary transcript.

In virology, the term transcription is used when referring to mRNA synthesis from a viral RNA molecule. The genome of many RNA viruses (Note: Notable vertebrate −ssRNA viruses include the Ebola virus, hantaviruses, influenza viruses, the Lassa fever virus, and the rabies virus.) is composed of negative-sense RNA which acts as a template for positive sense viral messenger RNA - a necessary step in the synthesis of viral proteins needed for viral replication. This process is catalyzed by a viral RNA dependent RNA polymerase.

== Background ==
A DNA transcription unit encoding for a protein may contain both a coding sequence, which will be translated into the protein, and regulatory sequences, which direct and regulate the synthesis of that protein. The regulatory sequence before (upstream from) the coding sequence is called the five prime untranslated regions (5'UTR); the sequence after (downstream from) the coding sequence is called the three prime untranslated regions (3'UTR).

As opposed to DNA replication, transcription results in an RNA complement that includes the nucleotide uracil (U) in all instances where thymine (T) would have occurred in a DNA complement.

Only one of the two DNA strands serves as a template for transcription. The antisense strand of DNA is read by RNA polymerase from the 3' end to the 5' end during transcription (3' → 5'). The complementary RNA is created in the opposite direction, in the 5' → 3' direction, matching the sequence of the sense strand except switching uracil for thymine. This directionality is because RNA polymerase can only add nucleotides to the 3' end of the growing mRNA chain. This use of only the 3' → 5' DNA strand eliminates the need for the Okazaki fragments that are seen in DNA replication. This also removes the need for an RNA primer to initiate RNA synthesis, as is the case in DNA replication.

The non-template (sense) strand of DNA is called the coding strand, because its sequence is the same as the newly created RNA transcript (except for the substitution of uracil for thymine). This is the strand that is used by convention when presenting a DNA sequence.

Transcription has some proofreading mechanisms, but they are fewer and less effective than the controls for copying DNA. As a result, transcription has a lower copying fidelity than DNA replication.

== Major steps ==
Transcription is divided into initiation, promoter escape, elongation, and termination.

=== Setting up for transcription ===
==== Enhancers, transcription factors, Mediator complex, and DNA loops in mammalian transcription ====
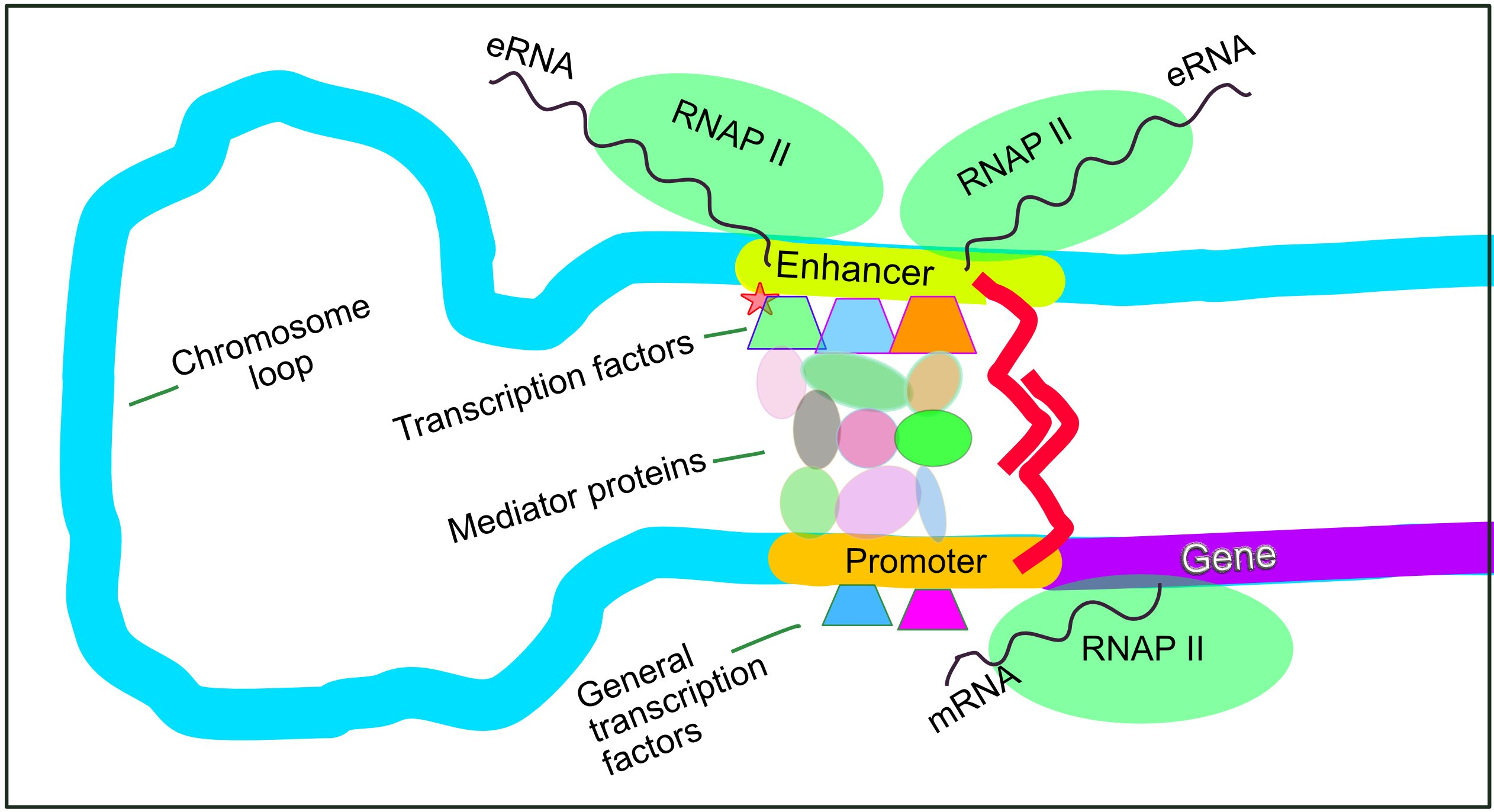
Regulation of transcription in mammals. This illustration indicates many of the elements that are present when transcription of a gene is upregulated.

Setting up for transcription in mammals is regulated by many cis-regulatory elements, including core promoter and promoter-proximal elements that are located near the transcription start sites of genes. Core promoters combined with general transcription factors are sufficient to direct transcription initiation, but generally have low basal activity. Other important cis-regulatory modules are localized in DNA regions that are distant from the transcription start sites. These include enhancers, silencers, insulators and tethering elements. Among this constellation of elements, enhancers and their associated transcription factors have a leading role in the initiation of gene transcription. An enhancer localized in a DNA region distant from the promoter of a gene can have a very large effect on gene transcription, with some genes undergoing up to 100-fold increased transcription due to an activated enhancer.

Enhancers are regions of the genome that are major gene-regulatory elements. Enhancers control cell-type-specific gene transcription programs, most often by looping through long distances to come in physical proximity with the promoters of their target genes. While there are hundreds of thousands of enhancer DNA regions, for a particular type of tissue only specific enhancers are brought into proximity with the promoters that they regulate. In a study of brain cortical neurons, 24,937 loops were found, bringing enhancers to their target promoters. Multiple enhancers, each often at tens or hundred of thousands of nucleotides distant from their target genes, loop to their target gene promoters and can coordinate with each other to control transcription of their common target gene.

The schematic illustration in this section shows an enhancer looping around to come into close physical proximity with the promoter of a target gene. The loop is stabilized by a dimer of a connector protein (e.g. dimer of CTCF or YY1), with one member of the dimer anchored to its binding motif on the enhancer and the other member anchored to its binding motif on the promoter (represented by the red zigzags in the illustration). Several cell function specific transcription factors (there are about 1,600 transcription factors in a human cell) generally bind to specific motifs on an enhancer and a small combination of these enhancer-bound transcription factors, when brought close to a promoter by a DNA loop, govern level of transcription of the target gene. Mediator (a complex usually consisting of about 26 proteins in an interacting structure) communicates regulatory signals from enhancer DNA-bound transcription factors directly to the RNA polymerase II (pol II) enzyme bound to the promoter.

Enhancers, when active, are generally transcribed from both strands of DNA with RNA polymerases acting in two different directions, producing two enhancer RNAs (eRNAs) as illustrated in the Figure. An inactive enhancer may be bound by an inactive transcription factor. Phosphorylation of the transcription factor may activate it and that activated transcription factor may then activate the enhancer to which it is bound (see small red star representing phosphorylation of transcription factor bound to enhancer in the illustration). An activated enhancer begins transcription of its RNA before activating transcription of messenger RNA from its target gene.

==== CpG island methylation and demethylation ====
This shows where the methyl group is added when 5-methylcytosine is formed

Transcription regulation at about 60% of promoters is also controlled by methylation of cytosines within CpG dinucleotides (where 5' cytosine is followed by 3' guanine or CpG sites). 5-methylcytosine (5-mC) is a methylated form of the DNA base cytosine (see Figure). 5-mC is an epigenetic marker found predominantly within CpG sites. About 28 million CpG dinucleotides occur in the human genome. In most tissues of mammals, on average, 70% to 80% of CpG cytosines are methylated (forming 5-methylCpG or 5-mCpG). However, unmethylated cytosines within 5'cytosine-guanine 3' sequences often occur in groups, called CpG islands, at active promoters. About 60% of promoter sequences have a CpG island while only about 6% of enhancer sequences have a CpG island. CpG islands constitute regulatory sequences, since if CpG islands are methylated in the promoter of a gene this can reduce or silence gene transcription.

DNA methylation regulates gene transcription through interaction with methyl binding domain (MBD) proteins, such as MeCP2, MBD1 and MBD2. These MBD proteins bind most strongly to highly methylated CpG islands. These MBD proteins have both a methyl-CpG-binding domain as well as a transcription repression domain. They bind to methylated DNA and guide or direct protein complexes with chromatin remodeling and/or histone modifying activity to methylated CpG islands. MBD proteins generally repress local chromatin such as by catalyzing the introduction of repressive histone marks, or creating an overall repressive chromatin environment through nucleosome remodeling and chromatin reorganization.

Schematic karyogram of a human, showing an overview of the human genome on G banding, wherein the lighter regions are generally more transcriptionally active, whereas darker regions are more inactive, including non-coding DNA.

As noted in the previous section, transcription factors are proteins that bind to specific DNA sequences in order to regulate the expression of a gene. The binding sequence for a transcription factor in DNA is usually about 10 or 11 nucleotides long. As summarized in 2009, Vaquerizas et al. indicated there are approximately 1,400 different transcription factors encoded in the human genome by genes that constitute about 6% of all human protein encoding genes. About 94% of transcription factor binding sites (TFBSs) that are associated with signal-responsive genes occur in enhancers while only about 6% of such TFBSs occur in promoters.

EGR1 protein is a particular transcription factor that is important for regulation of methylation of CpG islands. An EGR1 transcription factor binding site is frequently located in enhancer or promoter sequences. There are about 12,000 binding sites for EGR1 in the mammalian genome and about half of EGR1 binding sites are located in promoters and half in enhancers. The binding of EGR1 to its target DNA binding site is insensitive to cytosine methylation in the DNA.

While only small amounts of EGR1 transcription factor protein are detectable in cells that are un-stimulated, translation of the EGR1 gene into protein at one hour after stimulation is drastically elevated. Production of EGR1 transcription factor proteins, in various types of cells, can be stimulated by growth factors, neurotransmitters, hormones, stress and injury. In the brain, when neurons are activated, EGR1 proteins are up-regulated and they bind to (recruit) the pre-existing TET1 enzymes that are produced in high amounts in neurons. TET enzymes can catalyse demethylation of 5-methylcytosine. When EGR1 transcription factors bring TET1 enzymes to EGR1 binding sites in promoters, the TET enzymes can demethylate the methylated CpG islands at those promoters. Upon demethylation, these promoters can then initiate transcription of their target genes. Hundreds of genes in neurons are differentially expressed after neuron activation through EGR1 recruitment of TET1 to methylated regulatory sequences in their promoters.

The methylation of promoters is also altered in response to signals. The three mammalian DNA methyltransferasess (DNMT1, DNMT3A, and DNMT3B) catalyze the addition of methyl groups to cytosines in DNA. While DNMT1 is a maintenance methyltransferase, DNMT3A and DNMT3B can carry out new methylations. There are also two splice protein isoforms produced from the DNMT3A gene: DNA methyltransferase proteins DNMT3A1 and DNMT3A2.

The splice isoform DNMT3A2 behaves like the product of a classical immediate-early gene and, for instance, it is robustly and transiently produced after neuronal activation. Where the DNA methyltransferase isoform DNMT3A2 binds and adds methyl groups to cytosines appears to be determined by histone post translational modifications.

On the other hand, neural activation causes degradation of DNMT3A1 accompanied by reduced methylation of at least one evaluated targeted promoter.

=== Initiation ===
The regulatory sequence elements (yellow) at the start of a eukaryotic protein-coding gene, can be immediately upstream of the open read frame (ORF, red), or many kilobases away (upstream or downstream). Promoter and enhancer regions up-regulate (and silencers downregulate) transcription from DNA to mRNA. The 5' and 3' untranslated regions of that mRNA (UTR, blue) then regulate translation into the final protein product.

During transcription initiation, proteins (dark grey semi-circles) bound to the DNA can be brought into proximity with each other since the intervening DNA can loop back on itself. In this way, the basal transcription machinery can interact with distant activators and repressors many kilobases upstream or downstream of the open reading frame.

Transcription begins with the RNA polymerase and one or more general transcription factors binding to a DNA promoter sequence to form an RNA polymerase-promoter closed complex. In the closed complex, the promoter DNA is still fully double-stranded.

RNA polymerase, assisted by one or more general transcription factors, then unwinds approximately 14 base pairs of DNA to form an RNA polymerase-promoter open complex. In the open complex, the promoter DNA is partly unwound and single-stranded. The exposed, single-stranded DNA is referred to as the "transcription bubble".

RNA polymerase, assisted by one or more general transcription factors, then selects a transcription start site in the transcription bubble, binds to an initiating NTP and an extending NTP (or a short RNA primer and an extending NTP) complementary to the transcription start site sequence, and catalyzes bond formation to yield an initial RNA product.

In bacteria, the RNA polymerase core enzyme consists of five subunits: 2 α subunits, 1 β subunit, 1 β' subunit, and 1 ω subunit. It binds to a single transcription factor, called the sigma factor, and together they make up the RNA polymerase holoenzyme. Unlike in eukaryotes, the initiating nucleotide of nascent bacterial mRNA is not capped with a modified guanine nucleotide. It instead bears a 5′ triphosphate (5′-PPP), which can be used for genome-wide mapping of transcription initiation sites.

In archaea and eukaryotes, RNA polymerase contains subunits homologous to each of the five bacterial RNA polymerase subunits as well as unique ones. Instead of a single sigma factor, multiple general transcription factors are required to initiate transcription. Archaea have three general transcription factors: TBP, TFB, and TFE. In eukaryotes, RNA polymerase II requires six general transcription factors: TFIIA, TFIIB (an ortholog of archaeal TFB), TFIID (a multisubunit factor in which the key subunit, TBP, is an ortholog of archaeal TBP), TFIIE (an ortholog of archaeal TFE), TFIIF, and TFIIH. The TBP subunit of TFIID is the first to bind to DNA, while TFIIH is the last component to be recruited. In archaea and eukaryotes, the RNA polymerase-promoter closed complex is usually referred to as the "preinitiation complex".

Transcription initiation is regulated by additional proteins, known as activators and repressors, and, in some cases, associated coactivators or corepressors, which modulate formation and function of the transcription initiation complex.

=== Promoter escape ===
After the first bond is synthesized, RNA polymerase must escape the promoter. During this time there is a tendency to release the RNA transcript and produce truncated transcripts. This is called abortive initiation, and is common for both eukaryotes and prokaryotes. Abortive initiation continues to occur until an RNA product of a threshold length of approximately 10 nucleotides is synthesized, at which point promoter escape occurs and a transcription elongation complex is formed.

Mechanistically, promoter escape occurs through DNA scrunching, providing the energy needed to break interactions between RNA polymerase holoenzyme and the promoter.

In bacteria, it was historically thought that the sigma factor is definitely released after promoter clearance occurs. This theory had been known as the obligate release model. However, later data showed that upon and following promoter clearance, the sigma factor is released according to a stochastic model known as the stochastic release model.

In eukaryotes, at an RNA polymerase II-dependent promoter, upon promoter clearance, TFIIH phosphorylates serine 5 on the carboxy terminal domain of RNA polymerase II, leading to the recruitment of capping enzyme (CE). The exact mechanism of how CE induces promoter clearance in eukaryotes is not yet known.

=== Elongation ===
Simple diagram of transcription elongation

One strand of the DNA, the template strand (or noncoding strand), is used as a template for RNA synthesis. As transcription proceeds, RNA polymerase traverses the template strand and uses base pairing complementarity with the DNA template to create an RNA copy (which elongates during the traversal). Although RNA polymerase traverses the template strand from 3' → 5', the coding (non-template) strand and newly formed RNA can also be used as reference points, so transcription can be described as occurring 5' → 3'. This produces an RNA molecule from 5' → 3', an exact copy of the coding strand (except that thymines are replaced with uracils, and the nucleotides are composed of a ribose (5-carbon) sugar whereas DNA has deoxyribose (one fewer oxygen atom) in its sugar-phosphate backbone).

mRNA transcription can involve multiple RNA polymerases on a single DNA template and multiple rounds of transcription (amplification of particular mRNA), so many mRNA molecules can be rapidly produced from a single copy of a gene. The characteristic elongation rates in prokaryotes and eukaryotes are about 10–100 nts/sec. In eukaryotes, however, nucleosomes act as major barriers to transcribing polymerases during transcription elongation. In these organisms, the pausing induced by nucleosomes can be regulated by transcription elongation factors such as TFIIS.

Elongation also involves a proofreading mechanism that can replace incorrectly incorporated bases. In eukaryotes, this may correspond with short pauses during transcription that allow appropriate RNA editing factors to bind. These pauses may be intrinsic to the RNA polymerase or due to chromatin structure.

Double-strand breaks in actively transcribed regions of DNA are repaired by homologous recombination during the S and G2 phases of the cell cycle. Since transcription enhances the accessibility of DNA to exogenous chemicals and internal metabolites that can cause recombinogenic lesions, homologous recombination of a particular DNA sequence may be strongly stimulated by transcription.

=== Termination ===
Bacteria use two different strategies for transcription termination – Rho-independent termination and Rho-dependent termination. In Rho-independent transcription termination, RNA transcription stops when the newly synthesized RNA molecule forms a G-C-rich hairpin loop followed by a run of Us. When the hairpin forms, the mechanical stress breaks the weak rU-dA bonds, now filling the DNA–RNA hybrid. This pulls the poly-U transcript out of the active site of the RNA polymerase, terminating transcription. In Rho-dependent termination, Rho, a protein factor, destabilizes the interaction between the template and the mRNA, thus releasing the newly synthesized mRNA from the elongation complex.

Transcription termination in eukaryotes is less well understood than in bacteria, but involves cleavage of the new transcript followed by template-independent addition of adenines at its new 3' end, in a process called polyadenylation.

Beyond termination by a terminator sequences (which is a part of a gene), transcription may also need to be terminated when it encounters conditions such as DNA damage or an active replication fork. In bacteria, the Mfd ATPase can remove a RNA polymerase stalled at a lesion by prying open its clamp. It also recruits nucleotide excision repair machinery to repair the lesion. Mfd is proposed to also resolve conflicts between DNA replication and transcription. In eukayrotes, ATPase TTF2 helps to suppress the action of RNAP I and II during mitosis, preventing errors in chromosomal segregation. In archaea, the Eta ATPase is proposed to play a similar role.

=== Transcription increases susceptibility to DNA damage ===
Genome damage occurs with a high frequency, estimated to range between tens and hundreds of thousands of DNA damages arising in each cell every day. The process of transcription is a major source of DNA damage, due to the formation of single-strand DNA intermediates that are vulnerable to damage. The regulation of transcription by processes using base excision repair and/or topoisomerases to cut and remodel the genome also increases the vulnerability of DNA to damage.

== Role of RNA polymerase in post-transcriptional changes in RNA ==
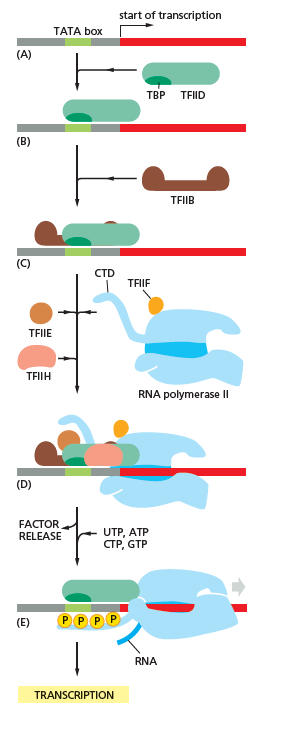
Image showing RNA polymerase interacting with different factors and DNA during transcription, especially CTD (C Terminal Domain)

RNA polymerase plays a very crucial role in all steps including post-transcriptional changes in RNA.

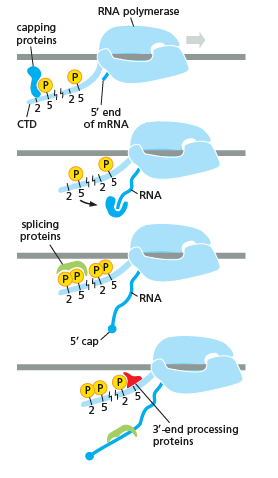
The Image shows how CTD is carrying protein for further changes in the RNA

As shown in the image in the right it is evident that the CTD (C Terminal Domain) is a tail that changes its shape; this tail will be used as a carrier of splicing, capping and polyadenylation, as shown in the image on the left.

== Inhibitors ==
Transcription inhibitors can be used as antibiotics against, for example, pathogenic bacteria (antibacterials) and fungi (antifungals). An example of such an antibacterial is rifampicin, which inhibits bacterial transcription of DNA into mRNA by inhibiting DNA-dependent RNA polymerase by binding its beta-subunit, while 8-hydroxyquinoline is an antifungal transcription inhibitor. The effects of histone methylation may also work to inhibit the action of transcription. Potent, bioactive natural products like triptolide that inhibit mammalian transcription via inhibition of the XPB subunit of the general transcription factor TFIIH has been recently reported as a glucose conjugate for targeting hypoxic cancer cells with increased glucose transporter production.

== Endogenous inhibitors ==
In vertebrates, the majority of gene promoters contain a CpG island with numerous CpG sites. When many of a gene's promoter CpG sites are methylated the gene becomes inhibited (silenced). Colorectal cancers typically have 3 to 6 driver mutations and 33 to 66 hitchhiker or passenger mutations. However, transcriptional inhibition (silencing) may be of more importance than mutation in causing progression to cancer. For example, in colorectal cancers about 600 to 800 genes are transcriptionally inhibited by CpG island methylation (see regulation of transcription in cancer). Transcriptional repression in cancer can also occur by other epigenetic mechanisms, such as altered production of microRNAs. In breast cancer, transcriptional repression of BRCA1 may occur more frequently by over-produced microRNA-182 than by hypermethylation of the BRCA1 promoter (see Low expression of BRCA1 in breast and ovarian cancers).

== Transcription factories ==
Active transcription units are clustered in the nucleus, in discrete sites called transcription factories or euchromatin. Such sites can be visualized by allowing engaged polymerases to extend their transcripts in tagged precursors (Br-UTP or Br-U) and immuno-labeling the tagged nascent RNA. Transcription factories can also be localized using fluorescence in situ hybridization or marked by antibodies directed against polymerases. There are ≈10,000 factories in the nucleoplasm of a HeLa cell, among which are ≈8,000 polymerase II factories and ≈2,000 polymerase III factories. Each polymerase II factory contains ≈8 polymerases. As most active transcription units are associated with only one polymerase, each factory usually contains ≈8 different transcription units. These units might be associated through promoters and/or enhancers, with loops forming a "cloud" around the factor.

== History ==
A molecule that allows the genetic material to be realized as a protein was first hypothesized by François Jacob and Jacques Monod. Severo Ochoa won a Nobel Prize in Physiology or Medicine in 1959 for developing a process for synthesizing RNA in vitro with polynucleotide phosphorylase, which was useful for cracking the genetic code. RNA synthesis by RNA polymerase was established in vitro by several laboratories by 1965; however, the RNA synthesized by these enzymes had properties that suggested the existence of an additional factor needed to terminate transcription correctly.

Roger D. Kornberg won the 2006 Nobel Prize in Chemistry "for his studies of the molecular basis of eukaryotic transcription".

== Measuring and detecting ==
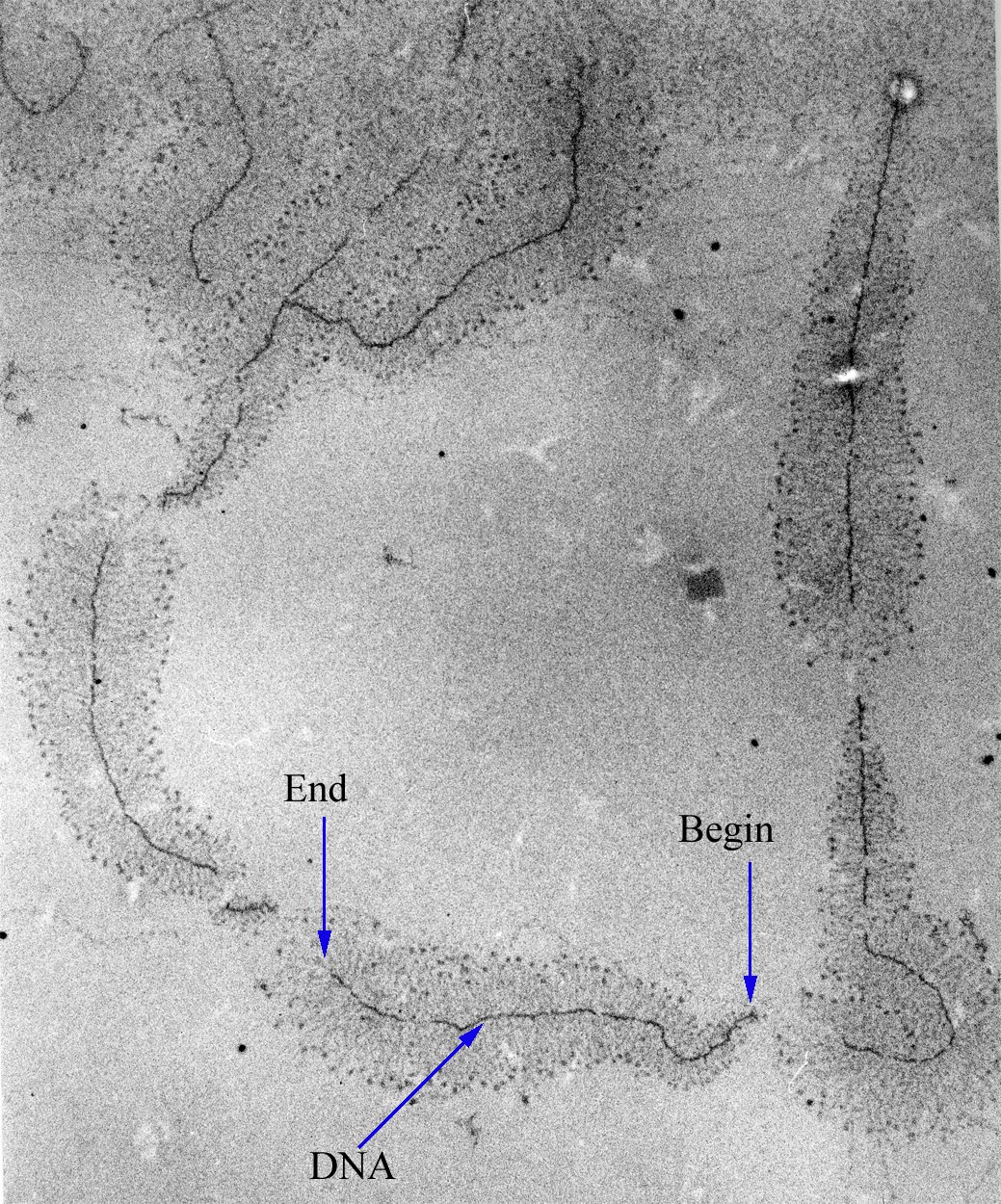
Electron micrograph of transcription of ribosomal RNA. The forming ribosomal RNA strands are visible as branches from the main DNA strand.

Transcription can be measured and detected in a variety of ways:

- G-Less Cassette transcription assay: measures promoter strength
- Run-off transcription assay: identifies transcription start sites (TSS)
- Nuclear run-on assay: measures the relative abundance of newly formed transcripts
- KAS-seq: measures single-stranded DNA generated by RNA polymerases; can work with 1,000 cells.
- RNase protection assay and ChIP-Chip of RNAP: detect active transcription sites
- RT-PCR: measures the absolute abundance of total or nuclear RNA levels, which may however differ from transcription rates
- DNA microarrays: measures the relative abundance of the global total or nuclear RNA levels; however, these may differ from transcription rates
- In situ hybridization: detects the presence of a transcript
- MS2 tagging: by incorporating RNA stem loops, such as MS2, into a gene, these become incorporated into newly synthesized RNA. The stem loops can then be detected using a fusion of GFP and the MS2 coat protein, which has a high affinity, sequence-specific interaction with the MS2 stem loops. The recruitment of GFP to the site of transcription is visualized as a single fluorescent spot. This new approach has revealed that transcription occurs in discontinuous bursts, or pulses (see Transcriptional bursting). With the notable exception of in situ techniques, most other methods provide cell population averages, and are not capable of detecting this fundamental property of genes.
- Northern blot: the traditional method, and until the advent of RNA-Seq, the most quantitative
- RNA-Seq: applies next-generation sequencing techniques to sequence whole transcriptomes, which allows the measurement of relative abundance of RNA, as well as the detection of additional variations such as fusion genes, post-transcriptional edits and novel splice sites
- Single cell RNA-Seq: amplifies and reads partial transcriptomes from isolated cells, allowing for detailed analyses of RNA in tissues, embryos, and cancers

== Reverse transcription ==
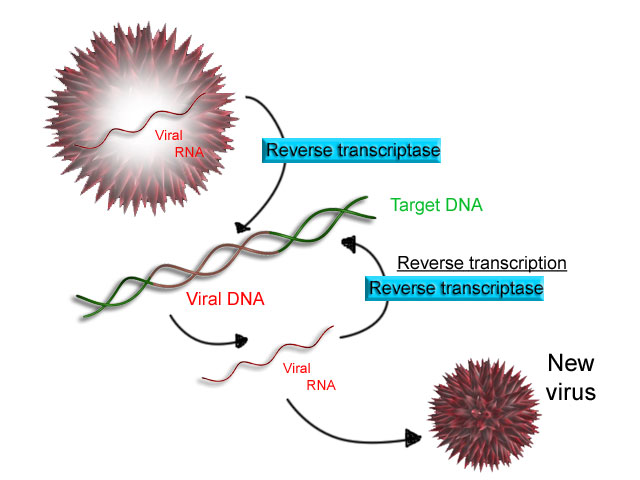
Scheme of reverse transcription

Some viruses (such as HIV, the cause of AIDS), have the ability to transcribe RNA into DNA. HIV has an RNA genome that is reverse transcribed into DNA. The resulting DNA can be merged with the DNA genome of the host cell. The main enzyme responsible for synthesis of DNA from an RNA template is called reverse transcriptase.

In the case of HIV, reverse transcriptase is responsible for synthesizing a complementary DNA strand (cDNA) to the viral RNA genome. The enzyme ribonuclease H then digests the RNA strand, and reverse transcriptase synthesises a complementary strand of DNA to form a double helix DNA structure (cDNA). The cDNA is integrated into the host cell's genome by the enzyme integrase, which causes the host cell to generate viral proteins that reassemble into new viral particles. In HIV, subsequent to this, the host cell undergoes programmed cell death, or apoptosis, of T cells. However, in other retroviruses, the host cell remains intact as the virus buds out of the cell.

Some eukaryotic cells contain an enzyme with reverse transcription activity called telomerase. Telomerase carries an RNA template from which it synthesizes a telomere, a repeating sequence of DNA, to the end of linear chromosomes. It is important because every time a linear chromosome is duplicated, it is shortened. With the telomere at the ends of chromosomes, the shortening eliminates some of the non-essential, repeated sequence, rather than the protein-encoding DNA sequence farther away from the chromosome end.

Telomerase is often activated in cancer cells to enable cancer cells to duplicate their genomes indefinitely without losing important protein-coding DNA sequence. Activation of telomerase could be part of the process that allows cancer cells to become immortal. The immortalizing factor of cancer via telomere lengthening due to telomerase has been proven to occur in 90% of all carcinogenic tumors in vivo with the remaining 10% using an alternative telomere maintenance route called ALT or Alternative Lengthening of Telomeres.

== See also ==
- Life
- Cell (biology)
- Cell division
- DBTSS
- Gene
- Gene regulation
- Epigenetics
- Genome
- Gene regulation
- Long non-coding RNA
- Missense mRNA
- Splicing – process of removing introns from precursor messenger RNA (pre-mRNA) to make messenger RNA (mRNA)
- Transcriptomics
- Translation (biology)
