= DBTSS =

Content
- Description: DataBase of Transcriptional Start Sites

Contact
- Research center: University of Tokyo
- Authors: Riu Yamashita
- Primary citation: Yamashita & al. (2012)
- Release date: 2011

Access
- Website: http://dbtss.hgc.jp.

DBTSS, the DataBase of Transcriptional Start Sites, is a database hosted by the Human Genome Center at the University of Tokyo. It contains the exact positions of transcriptional start sites in the genomes of various organisms.

== See also ==
- Transcription
