= G-less cassette =

The G-less cassette transcription assay is a method used in molecular biology to determine promoter strength in vitro. The technique involves quantification of an mRNA product with the use of a plasmid. The G-less cassette is part of a pre-constructed vector, usually containing a multiple cloning site (MCS) upstream of the cassette. For this reason, promoters of interest can be inserted directly into the MCS to ultimately measure the accuracy and efficiency of a promoter in recruiting transcription machinery.

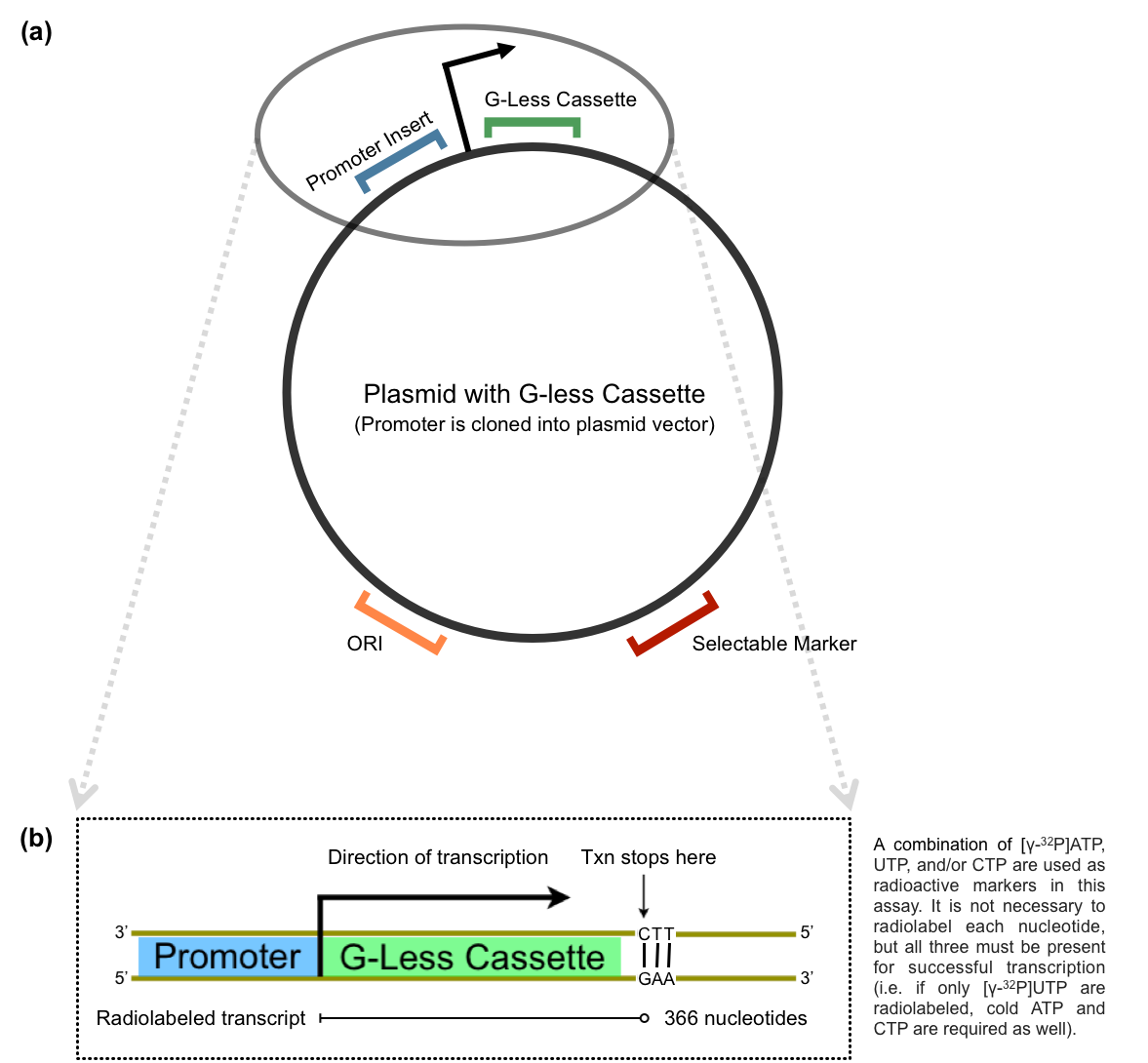
A promoter is cloned into the G-less cassette plasmid. (a) A pre-made plasmid with a 365-nt G-less sense strand is subjected to promoter insertion. (b) The promoter is cloned into the multiple cloning site (MCS) immediately upstream of the transcription start site. A polymerase is used transcribe the G-less cassette. Once the cassette has been transcribed and first guanosine triphosphate in the sense strand beyond the cassette is detected, transcription is prematurely terminated. A radiolabeled 365-nt transcript is released. The transcripts produced in a G-less cassette assay may be subjected to gel electrophoresis to confirm their length and autoradiography to determine relative promoter strength.

== Method ==
The G-less cassette is a reporter gene that encodes a transcript lacking guanine nucleotides in the sense strand of the DNA (hence "G-less"). A plasmid containing such a gene is located downstream of a MCS. After the promoter is inserted into the MCS, transcription proceeds with the addition of radiolabeled UTP, CTP, and ATP (as well as non-radiolabeled/cold nucleotides) and continues until the end of the G-less cassette is reached and guanine residues are once again apparent in the sense strand of the DNA. The absence of GTP in vitro results in transcription being prematurely terminated at the first guanine residue in the sense strand following the cassette. Gel electrophoresis is performed on the transcription products and the amount of radioactivity is quantified by autoradiography or phosphorimaging to determine the strength of the promoter of interest.

== Application ==
The G-less cassette technique is used to determine promoter strength beyond basal levels of transcription (i.e. in the presence of transcription activators or transcription factors). For example, to measure the effects of a TATA box consensus sequence modification in Saccharomyces cerevisiae in the presence of TFIID, G-less cassettes were implemented to measure the relative strength of each promoter.

== Advantages ==
The G-less assay can be performed on a circular plasmid to measure levels of transcription. A circular plasmid provides a more efficient template in many systems when compared to other assays such as runoff transcription, in which a cleaved end is required. This method generates radiolabeled transcripts very efficiently because it bypasses the unnecessary process of performing other indirect mRNA product measurements. The promoter is inserted into a circular plasmid containing the G-less cassette, which will generate a transcript of a certain length that omits random and nonspecific transcription throughout the plasmid. Most crude systems, such as HeLa nuclear extracts, are used because they contain low amounts of contaminating GTP that lead to background transcription and may occasionally cause random transcription to read through the G-less cassette.
