= Transcription bubble =

Molecular structure formed in DNA transcription

A transcription bubble is a molecular structure formed during the initialization of DNA transcription, when a limited portion of the DNA double helix is unwound, providing enough space for RNA polymerase (RNAP) to bind to the template strand and begin RNA synthesis. The transcription bubble size is usually 12 to 14 base pairs, which allows the incorporation of complementary RNA nucleotides by the enzyme with ease. The dynamics and structure of the transcription bubble are variable, and play a role in the regulation of gene expression at the transcriptional level. The formation of bubbles depends on the structure of chromatin, the DNA sequence, and transcription factor, including H3K27ac histone acetylation marks, SWI/SNF nucleosome remodeling, and TFIIH and sigma (σ) factors. While the evolutionary history cannot be completely confirmed, scientists have provided various models to explain the most likely progression of bubble evolution, tying it directly to the divergence of archaea, eukaryotes, prokaryotes, and bacteria from the last universal common ancestor (LUCA). Many drugs, including chemotherapeutic and antibiotic compounds, target elements of the transcription bubble to regulate gene transcription.

== Formation ==
The formation of a transcriptional bubble precedes RNA synthesis and is initialized by the binding of the RNA polymerase (RNAP) to a promoter site, followed by the unwinding of the DNA double helix. This exposes a portion of single-stranded DNA, allowing RNA to be synthesized using it as a template. As such, the formation of the transcription bubble depends heavily on promoter quality and RNAP search mechanisms.

=== Prokaryotic initiation ===
In prokaryotes, three mechanisms of RNAP's promoter search have been observed to various extents: 1D sliding, intersegment transfer (1D diffusion mechanisms), and hopping (3D diffusion mechanism). While the extent that each mechanism contributes is uncertain, mechanism which depends on 3D diffusion seem to outweigh 1D diffusion in vitro. However, due to the abundance of macromolecules found in living cells, 3D diffusion may be hindered, leading to a larger contribution of 1D diffusion than in vitro studies observe.

Various sigma (σ) factors mediate the association and stability of RNAP binding at a promoter site. RNAP binding of the σ factor creates RNA polymerase holoenzyme, the "active" form of bacterial RNAP. Binding of RNAP forms the closed promoter complex (RPc) which must then isomerize into the open promoter complex (RPo), driving the formation of the transcription bubble. Two broad classes of σ factors exist: σ^{54} and σ^{70}. σ^{54} binds to consensus sequences at -12 and -24 from the transcription start site (TSS; +1), and recruits RNAP to form a stable RPc which rarely isomerizes into an RPo. Meanwhile, σ^{70} class factors recruit RNAP at -10 and -35, forming the RPo spontaneously. The recruitment of σ^{70} is mediated by various activators which can promote the formation of the RPc. After the formation of the transcription bubble, the σ factors dissociate from holoenzyme complex, allowing RNAP to proceed along the DNA template strand to complete RNA synthesis alone. The progression of RNAP occurs simultaneously with the rewinding of single stranded DNA upstream from the enzyme and the unwinding of double stranded DNA downstream from the enzyme, resulting in the "movement" of the transcription bubble with the RNAP.

Rotating 3D structure of Eukaryotic RNA Polymerase II, essential for mRNA transcription

=== Eukaryotic initiation ===
In eukaryotes, the search for loci to open transcription bubbles occurs through the recruitment of general transcription factors to a promoter region and formation of the preinitiation complex (PIC). Once the PIC forms, the DNA duplex is melted, forming the transcription bubble. Of the enzymes involved, the TATA-binding protein (TBP) binds to the TATA box and causes DNA bending that leads to melting of the promoter region. The ATP-dependent helicase activity of XPB, a subunit of TFIIH, is required for DNA duplex unwinding and the formation of the transcription bubble after the PIC forms.

After about 25 base pairs of the DNA double strand are unwound, RNA synthesis takes place within the transcription bubble region. DNA regions in front of RNA polymerase II unwinds to accommodate the movement of the enzyme while DNA regions behind it simultaneously rewind to reform the double helix in a manner similar to that of prokaryotes.

RNAP carries out the majority of the steps during the transcription cycle, especially in maintaining the transcription bubble open for the complementary base pairing. Some steps of the transcription cycle that require more proteins, such as the Rpb4/7 complex and the elongation factor Transcription Factor IIS (TFIIS).

After initiation, RNAP moves downstream along the template strand. The net effect of each RNA extension step is that RNAP takes one nucleotide triphosphate, elongates the nascent RNA by one nucleotide, and generates a single pyrophosphate ion (PPi). This is an energetically favorable reaction with a free energy change of approximately −5.6 kcal/mol, allowing RNAP to go forward along its target template which by association moves the bubble forward as well.

== Termination ==
=== Prokaryotic termination ===
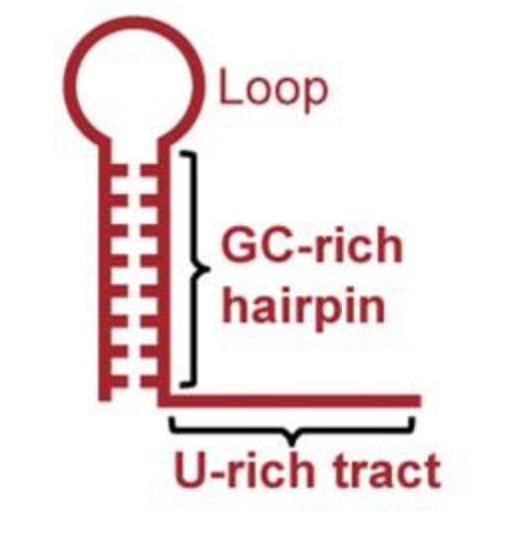
The structure of the RNA loop that induces rho-independent intrinsic termination of transcription in E. coli and other bacteria.

In Escherichia coli, the process of transcription termination via dissociation of the RNA polymerase have been found to depend on 3 possible mechanisms: an interaction between the polymerase and an intrinsic terminator sequence found on the hairpin loops of completed RNA, the presence of the RNA-dependent termination factor Rho, and the ATP-dependent DNA translocase Mfd.

Studies have found that the disruption of the RNAP-DNA transcription complex by termination factor Rho is inhibited for as long as the upstream DNA in the transcription bubble remain unpaired. Thus, the detachment of bacterial RNAP from DNA in a rho-dependent process is preceded by and depends on the re-annealing of DNA within the transcription bubble.

During rho-independent termination, the transcription of a hairpin loop on completed RNA, which serves as the intrinsic termination sequence, contributes to the collapse of the transcription bubble. This is followed by the detachment of RNAP from the template DNA and the re-annealing of DNA strands. This method of termination does not require the presence of the transcription bubble, as E.coli RNAP have been observed in vitro to release the completed RNA transcript while using single-stranded DNA templates.

The third process of termination, involving DNA translocase Mfd, affects primarily transcription bubbles which have stalled in the presence of DNA damage. The presence of Mfd in the transcription bubble forces the downstream movement of RNAP without the addition of nucleoside triphosphates, inducing the re-annealing of the DNA in the transcription bubble and the detachment of both the RNAP and the nascent RNA.

Transcription bubble termination in E. coli is regulated by a variety of transcription factors. One such factor is NusG, a ribosomal protein that enhances the efficiency of Rho-dependent termination by aiding Rho recognition of termination sequences. NusG action is mandatory in situations where RNA release has to be performed in a small window of time.

=== Eukaryotic termination ===
Transcription termination by eukaryotic RNA polymerase I (Pol I) requires transcription termination factors similar to rho-dependent termination in prokaryotes. In mice, repeated terminators encoded on DNA are exposed as single-stranded binding sites for protein TTF-I once they are reached by the transcription bubble. The complex produced by the terminator and TTF-I binding then induces the release of the transcript. RNA Polymerase II is terminated through direct binding of the 3′-end cleavage and polyadenylation (CPA) complex to the enzyme, which then releases the transcribed RNA. The recruitment of the CPA complex to the transcription bubble is induced by the transcription of a Poly-A signal on the nascent RNA.

In both cases, RNA cleavage and release occurs before the dissociation of the polymerase from the transcription bubble. Thus, the integrity of the transcription bubble is temporarily preserved after the initiation of termination. Two models have been proposed to explain the process of polymerase dissociation after RNA release for both polymerases. The first is the torpedo model, in which the polymerase continues to synthesize RNA after the release of the nascent RNA. Exonuclease activity then degrades the new RNA strand, destabilizing RNA polymerase and achieving its dissociation from the transcription bubble. The second mechanism, the allosteric model, proposes that transcription of the poly A sequence near the end of nascent RNAs causes gradual dissociation of other transcription factors from the transcription bubble, causing a chain effect that eventually collapses the transcription bubble thorough destabilization.

== Regulation ==
=== DNA sequence and supercoiling effects ===
Molecular dynamic simulations have found that the lifetime of the transcription bubble is sequence-dependent, and longer bubble lifetimes are associated with A-T rich core promoter sequences. The weaker A-T base interactions enable transcription bubbles to form due to the less energy needed for A-T pairs to separate. The supercoiling condition of DNA strongly affects how transcription processes regulate. Negative supercoiling that occurs before the transcription start site creates DNA strand separation which leads to transcription initiation. Positive supercoiling in front of RNA polymerase creates a barrier that leads to transcription stalling during elongation. The management of supercoiling stress depends on enzymes including DNA gyrase and topoisomerase. DNA gyrase creates negative supercoils while relaxing positive supercoils to establish the required superhelical tension for effective transcription. Topoisomerase I relax negative supercoils which keeps the DNA structure suitable for transcriptional activities.

=== Role of transcription factors ===
The general transcription factors (GTFs) TFIIH function as key elements for transcription initiation in eukaryotic cells. The XPB and XPD helicase subunits of TFIIH enable DNA unwinding through DNA duplex translocation which produces single-stranded regions needed for RNA polymerase II to start transcription. σ factors in bacteria serve as essential components to guide RNA polymerase toward particular promoter sequences which leads to the creation of the transcription bubble and the start of transcription. The protein p53 binds near promoter regions to affect the stability of the transcription bubble while showing different effects on transcription initiation at various target promoters.

A variety of transcription factors also affect the stability of transcription bubble initiation. DksA is crucial for rRNA transcription regulation. It has been found to decrease RNAP complex half-life, thereby inhibiting transcription from rRNA promoters and causing the destabilization of transcription bubble. Similarly, GreA and GreB are homologous factors that have effects similar to DksA, both are also known to reduce RNAP complex half-life. However, it has been discovered that the deletion of GreA and GreB has only minuscule effects on rRNA promoter activity and transcription bubble stability.

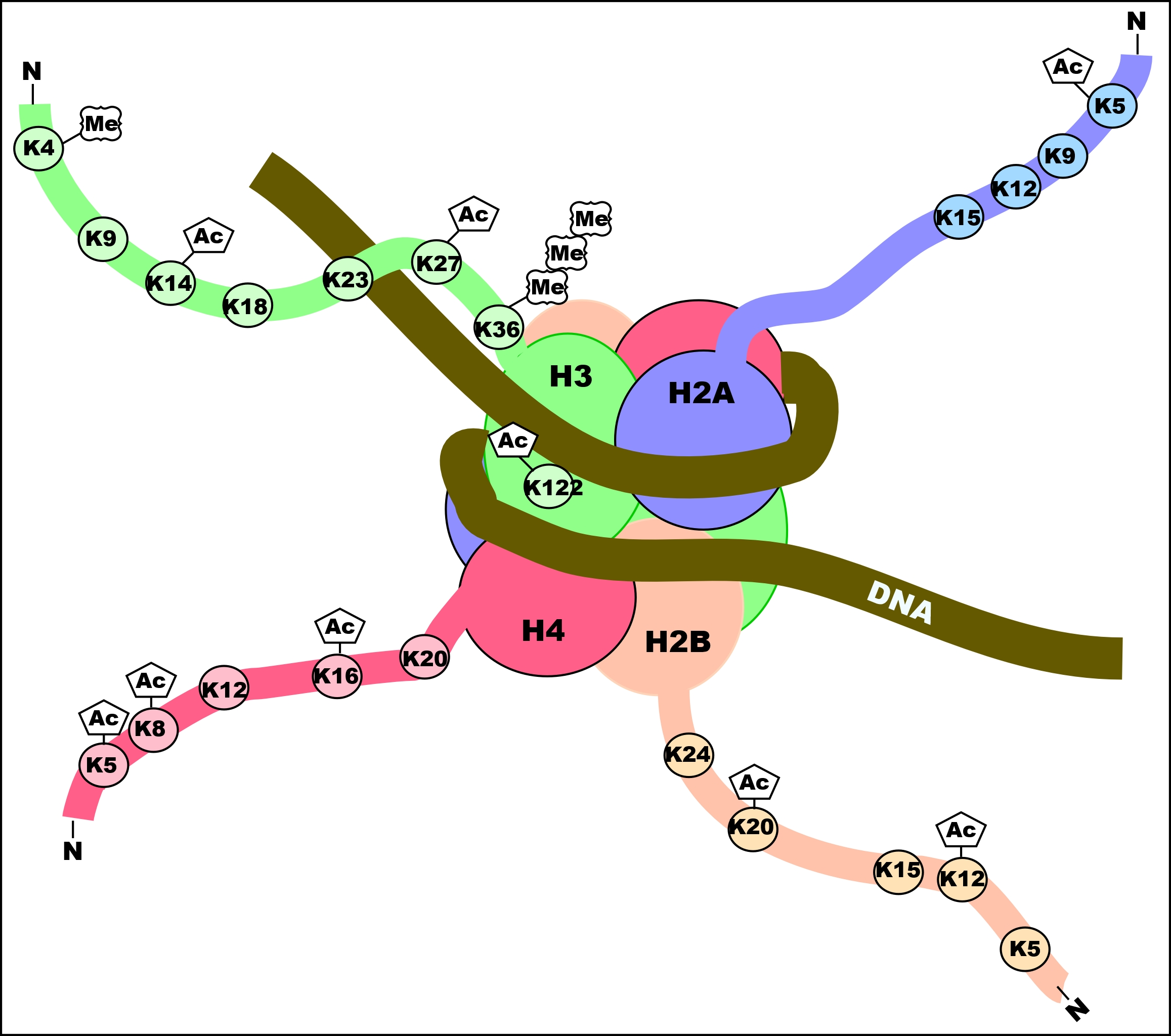
Nucleosome at an enhancer with H3K122 acetylation, promoting chromatin relaxation for transcription initiation

=== Epigenetic modifications and chromatin structure ===
Epigenetic modifications significantly influence chromatin structure and transcriptional activity. The acetylation of lysine 27 on histone 3 (H3K27ac) creates a less stable nucleosome structure, which leads to the formation of essential transcription bubbles that initiate transcription. The acetylation mark is predominantly found at active promoters together with enhancer regions where it leads to elevated transcriptional activity. The transcriptional impact of promoter region methylation varies based on the specific context and associated proteins present. The SWI/SNF complex functions as a chromatin remodeler to modify nucleosome positions through ATP-dependent mechanisms that remove or reposition nucleosomes to control RNA polymerase access and regulate transcription rates.

=== Temperature-dependence ===
The formation and maintenance of the transcription bubble is likely also temperature-dependent: temperature analyses on E.coli DNA suggest that the complex is formed at 37 °C and collapses at lower temperatures. These temperatures may vary depending on species. In conjunction with temperature, the presence of magnesium ions (Mg^{2+}) alongside an increase in temperature causes the unwinding of transcription bubbles further downstream up to a base position of +2, which correlates with the start of RNA synthesis. Extended melting at higher temperatures also enhances bubble stability during early transcription stages.

== Role in gene expression ==
In both eukaryotes and prokaryotes, multiple transcription start sites have been observed within the same promoter, and transcription bubble dynamics—such as expansion ("scrunching") and contraction ("unscrunching")—have been shown to play a role in the positioning of these variable transcription start sites to the RNA polymerase active site. As such, the structure of the transcription bubble plays a role in regulating gene expression through mediating the creation of different transcripts.

Structure of supercoiled DNA. Supercoiling is observed due to DNA unwinding and rewinding at the front and back of transcription bubble.

Scrunching of the transcription bubble is essential to RNAP promoter escape–an obligatory step that releases the RNAP from the promoter to begin elongation of the transcript. Prior to escape, RNAP conducts abortive initiation, where it synthesizes short ~2-9 nt RNA fragments without moving from where it is bound to the promoter. Scrunching of the transcription bubble is essential for this process, to keep the template DNA bases at the RNAP active site without RNAP translocation. The extent of bubble scrunching increases with the size of RNA. Thus, transcription elongation can only occur after sufficient bubble scrunching allows the formation of a large enough RNA product (~10 nt) to trigger promoter escape. The DNA bulges that form the transcription bubble occur at different locations on each strand.

The transcription bubble also generates DNA supercoiling upon RPo formation—a process known to be important to gene regulation. Transcription and bubble movement generates positive supercoiling (overwound helix) ahead of RNAP and negative supercoiling (underwound helix) behind it. The supercoiled structure of the DNA around the transcription bubble has been shown to inhibit elongation when stress is too high. Thus supercoiling due to bubble processes must be managed by topoisomerases.

== Evolutionary origins ==
The first DNA replication origins were hypothesized to be promoters for the 2-double-Ψ-β-barrel (2-DPBB) domains of RNAP. Replication was initiated using 2-DPBB type RNAPs followed by DNA synthesis with reverse transcriptase, providing the earliest known instances of transcription bubbles. 2-DPBB type RNAPs can either be RNA or DNA-template dependent, suggesting that these enzymes, and by extension transcription bubbles, evolved in an RNA world where DNA genomes gradually rose to prominence. Additionally, both DNA and RNA-dependent RNAPs possess a trigger loop and bridge helix, implying that these transcription bubble mechanisms are of ancient origins.

2-DPBB type RNAPs were most likely the primary machinery for transcription and replication of LUCA genome, which suggests that the divergence of bacteria and archaea stems from co-evolution with 2-DPBB type RNAPs, RNAP promoters, and RNAP general transcription factors (GTF). Bacterial promoters were noted to be strong promoters that have contacts with RNAP σA subunits but lack TATA-binding protein (TBP) and Transcription Factor E (TFE). This shows that transcription bubble machinery has been lost during bacterial divergence.

The similar consensus sequences between the Pribnow and TATA boxes found in archaea and eukaryotes respectively caused speculation that both had a common promoter structure in LUCA which diverged at some point in time. Divergence of promoters possibly influenced co-evolution with interacting transcription factors, implying that transcription bubble mechanisms most likely had shared origins stemming from LUCA.

== Pharmaceutical significance ==
Due to the importance of the transcription bubble to the initiation, propagation and termination of transcription, enzymes involved in transcription bubble upkeep are viable targets for drugs that function through gene expression regulation.

=== Dactinomycin (Actinomycin D) ===
Structure of Dactinomycin (Actinomycin D), a widely used chemotherapeutic drug that inhibits transcription by intercalating within transcription bubbles.

Dactinomycin is a potent intercalating agent and chemotherapeutic drug that works by inhibiting RNA synthesis. It binds directly to single-stranded DNA in the transcription bubble, the region of DNA where transcription is actively occurring. First isolated in 1940 by chemists Selman A. Waksman and H. Boyd Woodruff from Streptomyces, it has since become widely known for its use in cancer chemotherapy due to its ability to preferentially target and kill tumor cells.

Dactinomycin has wide applicability and is cytotoxic to a wide range of organisms. It is an effective bactericide, capable of inhibiting growth of both Gram positive and Gram negative bacteria, with higher dilutions required to achieve the same antibiotic effects. In eukaryotes, Dactinomycin is preferentially toxic to tumor cells, which makes it an effective chemotherapy drug. Dactinomycin can insert itself between the base pairs of double-stranded or single-stranded DNA, disrupting its normal structure. The drug binds primarily to guanine and cytosine residues found on newly separated single stranded DNA in transcription bubbles. The drug interferes with RNA synthesis machinery upon binding, physically preventing RNA polymerase from moving downstream and effectively inhibiting RNA elongation. This results in the lack of RNA synthesis in the affected cell, resulting in premature cell death.

Aside from its usage in medicine, the ability of Dactinomycin to inhibit RNA production makes it an effective experimental tool for RNA quantification and analysis.

=== Rifampicin ===
Rifampicin is a widely used antibiotic that targets bacterial RNA polymerase, inhibiting its ability to synthesize RNA. It is particularly effective against Mycobacterium tuberculosis, the bacterium responsible for tuberculosis, and has been commonly used in combination therapy for tuberculosis and other bacterial infections since 1965. Rifampicin directly binds to the bacterial RNA polymerase subunit β within the transcription bubble immediately after transcription initiation, physically preventing the elongation of the RNA strand past the first few nucleotides. The ongoing evolution of rifampicin-resistant strains of M. tuberculosis continue to present significant challenges to the usage of this drug in tuberculosis treatment. All recorded resistance-conferring mutations are isolated to the sequence of the bacterial RNA polymerase subunit β, the location where Rifampicin physically binds.

== See also ==
- Transcription factors
- Transcription (genetics)#Pre-initiation
- RNA polymerase
