= Sunil Kumar Podder =

Indian molecular biologist and biophysicist

- Born: 1 February 1937; Barisal District, Bengal Presidency, British India (now in Bangladesh)
- Died: 22 April 2023 (aged 86)
- Education: Calcutta University (MSc, PhD)
- Known for: Biophysical Studies on Ligand
- Awards: 1982 Shanti Swarup Bhatnagar Prize
- Scientific career
- Fields: Biophysics; Molecular biology
- Workplaces: Indian Institute of Science
- Doctoral advisor: Sadhan Basu
- Other academic advisors: Manfred Eigen
- Doctoral students: Dipankar Chatterji

Sunil Kumar Podder (1 February 1937 – 22 April 2023) was an Indian molecular biologist and biophysicist, known for his biophysical studies on Ligand. Focusing his researches on the recognition processes in biological systems and their chemical specificity, he proposed a model for measuring the specificity using free energy of association of amino acids of proteins with nucleic acid bases.

Podder took his doctorate under noted polymer chemist Sadhan Basu, subsequently conducting post-doctoral studies at the University of Pittsburgh and the Max Planck Institute for Biophysical Chemistry; he studied under Manfred Eigen at the latter institution. A former member of faculty at the department of biochemistry of the Indian Institute of Science where he taught from 1972 to 1997, and a life member of the Indian Biophysical Society, he published several articles detailing his research findings in peer reviewed journals and has presented many papers. The Council of Scientific and Industrial Research, the apex agency of the Government of India for scientific research, awarded him the Shanti Swarup Bhatnagar Prize for Science and Technology, one of the highest Indian science awards, in 1982, for his contributions to biological sciences.

== See also ==
- Dipankar Chatterji
