= Vas-occlusive contraception =

Form of male contraception that blocks sperm transport in the vas deferens

A diagram of the mechanism of action of vas-occlusive contraceptive methods.

Vas-occlusive contraception is a form of male contraception that blocks sperm transport in the vas deferens, the tubes that carry sperm from the epididymis to the ejaculatory ducts.

Various vas-occlusive contraceptive methods have been researched for human-use, with interest in both reversible and irreversible methods, with the purpose of finding a suitable alternative to vasectomy and possible hormonal contraceptive treatments that are currently being researched. Potential methods include clips, plugs, valves, polymers, hydrogels, and other devices.

== Types ==
There are numerous vas-occlusive contraceptive methods and devices that have been researched. Outlined here are a few main categories and descriptions.

=== Intravasal control valve (ICV) ===
An intravasal control valve is a reversible valve implanted in the vas deferens with the ability to either inhibit or permit sperm passage depending on the position of the device. Bionyx has developed a T-shaped intravasal control valve composed of gold and stainless steel for use in humans. Through rotation, a perforated ball within the T can be used to obstruct sperm flow or allow sperm flow. Skilled microsurgery is required for the ICV implant.

=== Chemosterilization ===
Injection of non-toxic and sclerotic chemicals in the vas deferens can result in blockage of sperm transport due to scarring on the vas deferens wall. At least 26 different chemical combinations have been attempted to achieve sterilization. A combination of carbolic and n-butyl alpha cyanoacrylate has resulted in complete blockage of the vas deferens through adhesion to the luminal surface. This chemical combination resulted in a 96% azoospermia and a 99% pregnancy prevention eight years follow injection in humans. The scar tissue created is not always compact and successful in occluding the vas deferens, which results in the 4% azoospermia failure rate. The injection of the chemical combination of ethanol and formaldehyde also resulted in sterility in humans. However, these chemical combinations are irreversible.

=== Vas-occlusive plugs ===
There are two types of vas-occlusive plugs: injectable plugs and non-injectable plugs. Injection of medical polyurethane (MPU) to form a plug in the vas deferens resulted in azoospermia in 96% of men, though these result were seen 24 months after injection. Studies on over 130 men following removal of the plug within five years showed successful restoration of fertility. The Shug, short for "silicon plug", is an example of a non-injectable plug, though there is little to no research on the Shug following 2008. The Shug is composed of two silicon plugs with accompanying nylon tails that attach to the vas deferens wall. It is surgically inserted into the vas deferens and must also be removed surgically. Shug human trials showed a 97% decrease in sperm motility through the vas deferens. However, plugs have been shown to have a lower efficacy rate when compared to traditional vasectomy overall.

=== Intravasal thread (IVT) ===
Insertion of an intravasal thread (IVT), also known as an intravasal device (IVD), in the vas deferens has been shown to inhibit sperm transport via mechanical obstruction and the removal of the IVT results in restored vas deferens patency. However, this method has differential species-specific results: in pigs, a plastic IVT had no significant effect on sperm count; in dogs, a plastic and polyethylene IVT consistently blocked sperm transport during the experimental period and removal of the device restored sperm transport after a period of two weeks; and in human subjects, a urethane-coated nylon IVT resulted in significantly reduced sperm count but could not guarantee absolute sterility at the same rate as a vasectomy.

=== RISUG ===
Reversible inhibition of sperm under guidance (RISUG) is a non-toxic polymer gel-based contraceptive that is injected into the lumen of the vas deferens and results in infertility within 10 days following injection. RISUG is composed of styrene maleic anhydride (SMA) dissolved in dimethyl sulfoxide (dimethyl sulfoxide), which is believed to both partially occlude the vas deferens by coating the inner walls of the vas deferens with the polymer chemical, while also deactivating the sperm that are able to pass through the partially occluded vas deferens, thereby preventing successful fertilization. The exact mechanism of the deactivation effect on sperm is still unknown. RISUG inhibits sperm transport but allows fluid to pass through, which prevents pressure from building up in the vas deferens. RISUG has been shown successful in previous human clinical trials in India and is currently undergoing Phase III clinical trials.

=== Vasalgel ===
Vasalgel was inspired by RISUG and created by the Parsemus Foundation in order to be used outside of India. Vasalgel is composed of 25% styrene-alt-maleic acid (SMA acid) dissolved in dimethyl sulfoxide. The major difference between RISUG and Vasalgel is that Vasalgel is composed of SMA acid without SMA anhydride, which allows for a longer shelf-life, smaller probability of hydrolysis to an acid, and less complex production process. Vasalgel was successful in achieving azoospermia in rabbits within 36 days of injection, as well as returned vas deferens patency. In 2023, the patent for Vasalgel was acquired by NEXT Life Sciences, Inc., which plans to bring the technology to market under the name Plan A for Men.

=== ADAM ===
Contraline, Inc. is developing a vas-occlusive medical device known as ADAM. ADAM is an injectable hydrogel designed specifically for the dynamic environment of the vas deferens. Unlike RISUG and Vasalgel, which require injection in organic solvent, ADAM is aqueous-based. The ADAM hydrogel is inserted through a minimally-invasive, outpatient procedure. The company has made advancements in percutaneous (non-surgical) delivery of vas-occlusive devices using ultrasound guidance. Clinical trials on ADAM began in 2022.

== Side effects ==
Vas-occlusive contraception methods are expected to have similar side effects to vasectomy, which is generally regarded as a safe and low-risk procedure.

== See also ==
- Male contraceptive
