= Polyscope =

Polyscope may refer to:

- Polyscope Productions Ltd., Canadian motion picture company
- Selig Polyscope Company, early American motion picture company
- Polyscope Media Group, a TV program/film production company
- Le Polyscope, a student newspaper of École Polytechnique de Montréal, Canada
- Polyscope film sound system
- Polyscope Polymers, a major producer of the SMA polymer
