= C15H10Cl2N2O2 =

The molecular formula C_{15}H_{10}Cl_{2}N_{2}O_{2} (molar mass: 321.158 g/mol) may refer to:

- Lonidamine
- Lorazepam
