= Sujoy K. Guha =

Indian biomedical engineer

- Born: 20 June 1940 (age 86); Patna, Bihar
- Citizenship: India
- Education: IIT Kharagpur; University College of Medical Sciences (UCMS)
- Known for: Reversible inhibition of sperm under guidance
- Awards: Padma Shri,2020
- Scientific career
- Fields: biomedical engineer

Sujoy Kumar Guha is an Indian biomedical engineer. He was born in Patna, India, 20 June 1940. He did his undergraduate degree (B.Tech.) in electrical engineering from IIT Kharagpur, followed by a master's degree in electrical engineering at IIT, and another master's degree from the University of Illinois, Urbana-Champaign. Guha later received his PhD in medical physiology from St. Louis University.

Guha founded the Centre for Biomedical Engineering. He obtained his MBBS degree from the University College of Medical Sciences, Delhi University. One of the founders of biomedical engineering in India, Guha is internationally known in the areas of rehabilitation engineering, bioengineering in reproductive medicine, and technology for rural health care. He has received several awards and has more than 100 research papers in cited journals. In 2003, he became a chair professor at IIT Kharagpur. He was awarded the Padma Shri, India's fourth-highest civilian honor in 2020.

Guha's major contributions have been in the invention and development of the non-hormonal polymer-based injectable male contraceptive (RISUG), for which the final Phase III clinical trials were completed in 2019.
