= Contraception (disambiguation) =

Contraception is birth control, the use of methods or devices to prevent unwanted pregnancy.

Contraception may also refer to:

- Contraception (journal), a peer-reviewed journal covering reproductive medicine
- Contraception (veterinary), specifically related to dogs and cats
