= Chuen Yan Cheng =

Prof Chuen Yan Cheng
- Born: June 18, 1954 (age 72); Hong Kong, China
- Education: Chinese University of Hong Kong (B.Sc.); University of Newcastle, Australia (Ph.D.)
- Known for: Male contraceptive drug
- Awards: Richard E. Weizman Memorial Award; Best Scientific Paper Award
- Scientific career
- Fields: Biochemistry
- Workplaces: Rockefeller University

Chuen Yan Cheng (Chinese: 鄭泉恩) is a Senior Scientist for the Population Council's Center for Biomedical Research. He is most well known as the inventor of the non-steroid male contraceptive drug—Adjudin, which is the first male contraceptive drug on the market now finished clinical trials showing no side effects.

== Career ==
He graduated from the Chinese University of Hong Kong with a B.Sc. in 1977, and obtained his Ph.D. in biochemistry and cell biology at the University of Newcastle, Australia, in 1981. He came to New York as a Population Council post-doctoral trainee in 1981, studying in the laboratory of Drs. Wayne Bardin, Neal Musto, and Glen Gunsalus and was appointed as a research investigator in December 1982.

Cheng's research focuses on the development of a novel contraceptive for human males. These studies currently are supported by grants from the National Institutes of Health, the CONRAD Program, and the Andrew Mellon Foundation.
