= Parsemus Foundation =

American organization

The Parsemus Foundation is an American non-governmental organization whose objective is to advance low-cost evidence-based medicines not pursued by the pharmaceutical industry. The foundation's focus is on supporting small proof-of-concept studies and then pursuing press coverage of the results, so that the advances change treatment practice rather than disappearing into the scientific literature. Many of the studies supported involve low-cost approaches that are not under patent.

== Background ==
Founded in 2005, Parsemus is an advocate of research into the plausibility of RISUG (and a method based on RISUG, called Vasalgel), a reversible male contraceptive. The foundation began procuring RISUG's United States intellectual property rights in November 2010, completed the acquisition process in February 2012, and is for the past 8 years conducting toxicology tests as an initial step towards Food and Drug Administration approval.

Vasalgel production has continually been delayed. Human trials for Vasalgel were approved and planned for 2015–2016 with missed market release in 2017.

The foundation has also engaged in animal testing and aims to prioritize animal welfare. The organization offers resources on alternative methods of fertility control (neutering) for dogs and cats. Its focus has been on ovary-sparing spay for female dogs and cats, vasectomy for male dogs and cats, and non-surgical sterilization using calcium chloride-based formulations for male dogs and cats. As of 2017, reversibility has been unsuccessful in animal trials in the United States.

The foundation was also noted for its support of the Archives of Internal Medicine's less-is-more series.

Parsemus Foundation has not managed to bring RISUG to mass use.
