= Adjudin =

Chemical compound

Clinical data
- ATC code: none

Legal status
- Legal status: US: Investigational New Drug

Identifiers
- IUPAC name: 1-(2,4-dichlorobenzyl)-1H-indazole-3-carbohydrazide
- CAS Number: 252025-52-8
- PubChem CID: 9819086
- ChemSpider: 7994835
- UNII: VZT8V72829
- CompTox Dashboard (EPA): DTXSID0040383

Chemical and physical data
- Formula: C_{15}H_{12}Cl_{2}N_{4}O
- Molar mass: 335.19 g·mol^{−1}
- 3D model (JSmol): Interactive image
- SMILES: C1=CC=C2C(=C1)C(=NN2CC3=C(C=C(C=C3)Cl)Cl)C(=O)NN
- InChI: InChI=1S/C15H12Cl2N4O/c16-10-6-5-9(12(17)7-10)8-21-13-4-2-1-3-11(13)14(20-21)15(22)19-18/h1-7H,8,18H2,(H,19,22); Key:VENCPJAAXKBIJD-UHFFFAOYSA-N

Adjudin (AF-2364) is a drug which is under development as a potential non-hormonal male contraceptive drug, which acts by blocking the production of sperm in the testes, but without affecting testosterone production. It is an analogue of the chemotherapy drug lonidamine, an indazole-carboxylic acid, and further studies continue to be conducted into this family of drugs as possible contraceptives.

As of 1 May 2007, adjudin was in phase II human trials.

As shown in mature male rats, the agent induces reversible germ cell loss from the seminiferous epithelium by disrupting cell adhesion function between Sertoli and germ cells. It weakens the adhesion between the Sertoli cell and maturing sperm leading to a sloughing and loss of the latter. As it does not affect spermatogonia themselves the loss of fertility is reversible. In experiments hormonal levels (FSH, LH, testosterone) were undisturbed during administration, and normal spermatogenesis returned in 95% of the tubules of rats at 210 days after the drug had been discontinued.

When taken orally, the drug has very low bioavailability. The oral dose effective for contraception is so high that there have been side effects in the muscles and liver. Coupling an Adjudin molecule to a mutant form of follicle-stimulating hormone may solve this problem. The mutant FSH is modified such that it no longer induces Inhibin B production, but the membrane-bound FSH receptors on Sertoli cells still bind to it, delivering the Adjudin directly to the target cells. The adjudin-FSH can be either injected, delivered in an implant, or as a gel.

A study in 2013 indicated that Adjudin, similar to its analogue lonidamine, has properties that inhibit cancer growth by targeting mitochondria and blocking energy metabolism in certain kinds of tumor cells in mice, indicating that it has potential as a drug for cancer therapy.

It was invented by Chuen Yan Cheng.
