= Zeuterin =

Zeuterin (zū-tur-in) is the trade name of an injectable product containing zinc gluconate and the amino acid arginine, which is used for sterilizing young male dogs without the removal of the testicles. The product is injected directly into the testicle, where the zinc gluconate destroys the sperm and causes inflammation, which leads to fibrosis and causes sterility. Sperm production continues for up to 60 days after product administration, and in some dogs does not stop completely, although the product is 99.6% effective when given to dogs aged 3-10 months of age. Following administration, the testicles atrophy; the degree of atrophy may vary noticeably between testicles. The male hormone, testosterone, is produced in limited quantities following treatment with Zeuterin, but after two years, testosterone production is similar to that in untreated dogs. The continuing presence of testosterone means that, unlike surgical castration, chemical castration does not remove the risk of testosterone-associated disease, such as prostatic disease.

This method of chemical castration is contraindicated in cases of undescended testicles (cryptorchidism), or if scrotal dermatitis or testicular disease is present. If the product is not injected correctly, scrotal ulceration and swelling may occur. The manufacturer, Ark Sciences, certifies veterinarians to use Zeuterin after they have completed a 5-hour course regarding the correct location and manner to inject the drug.

In the United States, this product was approved by the Food and Drug Administration in 2003, under the trade name Neutersol, and was marketed from 2003 to 2005 by Pet Healthcare International. In 2005, Pet Healthcare International severed ties with its manufacturing partner Addison Biologicals, and production of the drug stopped. Ark Sciences acquired the intellectual property to Neutersol, rebranded it as Zeuterin, and relaunched it in 2014. In 2016, Ark Sciences suspended distribution of Zeuterin.

Outside of the United States, Zeuterin is known by the trade name Esterilsol. Zeuterin is based on work done by Mostafa S. Fahim to develop a "drug, herein called Kastrin" for use on mammals: "the present treatment can be used on male sheep, pigs, horses and other similar mammals having scrotal testes, including human males."
