= Pediatric spaying =

Castration or neutering of a kitten or puppy

Pediatric spaying (also known as “prepuberal” or “early” spaying) or neutering is defined as performing an ovariohysterectomy (spaying) or orchidectomy (castration or neutering) on a kitten or puppy between the ages of 6 and 14 weeks. Spaying and neutering are sterilization procedures which prevent the animals from reproducing. The procedures are also referred to as “gonadectomies” in the veterinary literature.

== Background ==
It was once believed that female cats and dogs should not be spayed until the animal delivered one litter or, at least, experienced one estrus or “heat” cycle. (There was little concern about neutering males, other than for behavioral reasons, since males do not get pregnant.) Research in the 1960s proved that female animals permitted to reach sexual maturity prior to being spayed were susceptible to a higher risk of mammary cancer than those animals spayed prior to their first cycle. As a result, the recommendation was revised to perform surgeries just prior to the average anticipated age for the first cycle, 4 to 6 months for cats and 6 to 12 months for dogs.

Research from the 1990s and early 2000s suggests that it is safe, and maybe even desirable, to perform sterilization surgeries prior to sexual maturity and as early as 6 weeks old (but no less than 1 kilogram [2 lbs]).

Preventing breeding through sterilization is considered one approach to controlling the population and reducing the number of animals surrendered to shelters, thus reducing the number of healthy but homeless animals killed in shelters. Animal shelters typically have policies requiring adopters to spay or neuter cats and dogs after adoption but compliance rates are usually low. While a majority of adopted animals are eventually sterilized, many females have a litter prior to the surgery.

Shelters that have access to spay/neuter services and participate in pediatric spay/neuter programs can ensure that nearly 100% of adopted animals are sterilized prior to adoption.

== AVMA policy on pediatric spay/neuter ==
The American Veterinary Medical Association issued a policy on Early-Age (Prepubertal) Spay/Neuter of Dogs and Cats in 1994. It was revised by the AVMA Executive Board April 1999 and April 2004 and now reads as follows:

The AVMA supports the concept of early (prepubertal, 8 to 16 weeks of age) spay/neuter in dogs and cats in an effort to reduce the number of unwanted animals of these species. Just as for other veterinary medical and surgical procedures, veterinarians should use their best medical judgment in deciding at what age spay/neuter should be performed on individual animals.

Although it is desirable to spay/neuter early for population control, there has been considerable concern from the veterinary community over these practices that have not been validated by substantial third party study of the long term outcomes. They revised their recommendation in 2017 to extend the feline spay age.

The AVMA Board of Directors has endorsed a document recommending that cats not intended for breeding be gonadectomized prior to five months of age.

== Anesthesia and surgical considerations ==
Some of the concerns expressed about pediatric sterilization include the possibility of complications due to the effects of anesthesia or the surgery itself on the younger patients. For instance, younger patients have a higher oxygen consumption rate than adults requiring a higher respiratory rate. Since anesthetic drugs depress respiration, kittens and puppies must be monitored for hypoventilation.

By using recommended drugs and procedures, anesthetic and surgical risks can be reduced. Protocol was established through research by the Massachusetts SPCA and Texas A&M University which mitigates the risk involved in anesthetizing pediatric patients and includes ensuring proper doses of anesthetic agents.

Surgical techniques are similar to those used for older or adult animals. The primary areas of concern for pediatric patients are predisposition to hypothermia and hypoglycemia, relatively small volume of blood, and delicate tissues. Maintaining body heat, ensuring proper blood glucose levels by minimizing the fasting period prior to surgery, and gentle handling reduce the risks.

Veterinarians frequently report that surgery takes less time and has lower risk of hemorrhage with pediatric patients than with adults. Pediatric patients usually recover more quickly from anesthesia than adult patients, as well.

== Long term health and behavioral concerns ==
In addition to the immediate concerns related to anesthesia and surgery, veterinarians expressed concern that early sterilization would result in:

1. Increased risk of obesity due to lack of activity;
2. Stunting of normal growth;
3. Impaired development of the urinary tract leading to an increased incidence of cystitis or urinary obstruction in cats and urinary incontinence in dogs;
4. Increased susceptibility to infection; and
5. Behavioral problems.

== Results of studies and post-operative investigations ==
Controlled studies and anecdotal reports have addressed many of these issues:

1. Studies have found no significant difference in weight between cats and dogs sterilized between 6 and 14 weeks of age and those sterilized at an older age.
2. Limbs of animals sterilized at a younger age tended to continue growing for a longer period of time than those of animals sterilized later (or not at all), resulting in slightly taller individuals. There is a higher occurrence (by 2 percentage points) of dogs sterilized at an early age with hip dysplasia; however, these dogs are three times less likely to be euthanized for the condition than dogs altered at an older age, so the condition suffered by the dogs sterilized at an earlier age may be less severe.
3. While external sexual organs of the animals who were sterilized at a younger age did not mature fully or to the same extent of those sterilized later, there was no significant negative impact on urinary tract health for most animals. Male cats sterilized at a younger age experienced a lower rate of urinary tract blockage than male cats sterilized at an older age. The one significant cause for concern in the studies was an increased incidence of urinary incontinence in female dogs, leading to recommendations to delay spaying female dogs until 3 months of age when there is no concern about non-compliance with spay policies.
4. There was no evidence of increased risk of infection for cats. Cats sterilized at a younger age showed a lower incidence of gingivitis (a condition which may be associated with immune suppression) than those sterilized at an older age. For dogs, there was a significant increase in the risk of parvovirus during the post-operative period for younger age patients, but the researchers are not convinced that this translates into long term disposition to infection or is directly related to the nature of the procedure. It may be because dogs in shelters are at a higher risk for infectious disease and any surgery increases the risk of infection.
5. While animals sterilized at younger ages were more prone to noise phobias and engaging in sexual behaviors, such as undesirable mounting, other behavioral issues such as separation anxiety, escaping behaviors, inappropriate elimination when frightened, and relinquishment were decreased in the population.
