= Non-surgical fertility control for dogs and cats =

Non-surgical methods of avoiding unattended pregnancy in domestic animals

Non-surgical fertility control is the prevention of reproduction without the use of surgery. The most common form of sterilization in dogs and cats is surgical, spaying in females and castration in males. Non-surgical fertility control can either result in sterilization or temporary contraception and could offer a cheaper way to keep wild dog and cat populations under control. As of 2019, only contraceptives are commercially available. Research is ongoing into methods that could result in permanent suppression of fertility.

== Background ==
As of 2013, an estimated 75% of 700 million dogs worldwide were free to roam and reproduce, resulting in overpopulation, high mortality rates and poor health. The main management approach is surgical sterilization, i.e. the removal of testes or ovaries, often performed through trap-neuter-return strategies. However this approach requires significant resources, including appropriate facilities. If successful, non-surgical approaches may be a more humane, economic and time-efficient option, although no effective permanent treatment is yet available.

Orally administered contraception for dogs and cats became available in Europe in 1963, followed by the US in the 1970s. The initial products were mostly progestin-based treatments implemented for sterilization. One of the first drugs sold was medroxyprogesterone acetate (MPA). MPA was effective in reducing estrous production in female dogs as well as reducing testosterone levels in males. It was later removed from the market due to a high risk of cystic endometrial hyperplasia and uterine infection. Another progestin-based drug, megestrol acetate, was also found to be effective in prevention of oestrus in female dogs, but required administration at specific time intervals, making it unsuitable for feral animals.

Research into gonadotropin-releasing hormone (GnRH) as a treatment for men with prostate cancer subsequently led to its consideration as a fertility inhibitor for dogs. GnRH inhibits sex hormones like estrogen and testosterone, inhibiting ovulation and sperm production.

== Available products ==
There are a limited number of non-surgical fertility control options available for cats and dogs, which vary in effectiveness, duration of action and safety.

- Progestin contraceptives are approved for contraception in male and female dogs and cats in multiple countries. Typically approval is for a few months of use.
- Zeuterin™, formerly known as EsterilSol™ and Neutersol™, received approval from the U.S. Food and Drug Administration (FDA) in 2014 for permanent sterilization of male dogs. It is also approved for use in Mexico, Colombia, Bolivia, Panama, and Turkey. It was administered as an injection as a single dose in each testicle. It is not currently commercially available.
- A GnRH analog (deslorelin) acetate implant marketed under the name Suprelorin® is approved in the European Union, Australia, and New Zealand for the suppression of fertility in male dogs. It is administered as a small subcutaneous implant that delivers a low continuous dose of deslorelin for 6 to 12 months.

== Research on non-surgical sterilization/contraception ==
The Michelson Prize & Grants in Reproductive Biology, a program of the Found Animals Foundation, is the largest single source of funding for research to advance non-surgical fertility control for cats and dogs. Up to $50 million in grants for research into nonsurgical sterilization methods has been committed by the foundation. A $25 million Michelson Prize has been offered for the first entity to develop a single-dose, permanent, nonsurgical sterilizing agent that is safe and effective in male and female cats and dogs.

=== Inorganic compounds ===
Calcium chloride-based formulations given as single intratesticular injections are being studied as a method to sterilize male animals, but are not approved by the FDA or any other international regulatory agency. Several organizations, including the Parsemus Foundation, SpayFIRST!, and Calcium Chloride Castration advocate for the use of these formulations. The Alliance for Contraception in Cats and Dogs (ACC&D) considers the use of intratesticular calcium chloride experimental and advises caution.

=== Immunological approaches ===
Vaccines can stimulate the body's immune system to produce antibodies to key proteins involved in reproduction, inhibiting these proteins' functions.

Vaccines against gonadotropin-releasing hormone (GnRH) and porcine zona pellucida (PZP) are known as GonaCon™ and ZonaStat-H/ZonaStat-D, respectively. Both have been approved by the U.S. Environmental Protection Agency for contraception in female wild horses, wild burros, and white-tailed deer, and provide suppression of fertility a year or more, with boosters required for prolonged suppression. GonaCon has been studied in male and female dogs and cats but does not provide long-acting suppression of fertility in these species. In dogs in particular, injection site reactions preclude use of the EPA approved formulation. Zona pellucida vaccines are targeted at females and do not suppress fertility in dogs or cats.

=== Hormone agonists and antagonists ===
Many GnRH agonists similar to Suprelorin® have been developed for human use. When given as long-acting implants, these cause "medical castration," that is, the complete suppression of reproductive activity and the suppression of sex steroids. They have been shown to be effective in both dogs and cats.

Compounds that bind and block the GnRH receptor can also cause suppression of fertility and sex steroids. Compounds such as cetrorelix and ganorelix have been shown to cause short-term fertility suppression in dogs. None of these compounds, however, have been developed for this use, likely due to the high cost of manufacture.

Treatment with Müllerian inhibiting hormone (MIH) can cause regression of follicles and result in suppression of fertility in female animals.

=== Targeted delivery of cytotoxins ===
Killing specific cells in either the brain (GnRH neurons) or the pituitary gland (gonadotrophs) that are vital for reproduction should result in permanent sterility. However, these approaches have not yet been shown to be effective in dogs and cats. The concept is to attach a potent cytotoxin, such as saporin, to a targeting molecule. The hybrid toxin-targeting molecule would then bind only the target cells, and deliver the toxin, killing them. In one study, a toxin (pokeweed antiviral protein) was conjugated to GnRH to target the GnRH receptors on the pituitary gonadotrophs. Treatment of dogs showed a decrease in testosterone, which however was not permanent. A number of approaches of this kind have been attempted with no evidence of effectiveness in any species.

=== Gene delivery ===
DNA can be delivered into cells, usually by using a viral vector, to alter protein expression. This approach could be used to express proteins that inhibit reproduction by a variety of methods. Promising results have been observed using viral vectors to cause the expression of MIH in female mice and in female cats. Similarly, expression of antibodies against GnRH has been effective in mice, but the levels achieved in cats were insufficient to be effective. Immune responses to the expressed proteins may have limited the duration of the contraceptive effect. Gene delivery approaches have been effective in other areas, leading to optimism that this approach may eventually be successful.

== Regulatory Approval ==
In the United States, the Food and Drug Administration Center for Veterinary Medicine, the Department of Agriculture Center for Veterinary Biologics, or the Environmental Protection Agency regulate veterinary medicines, depending on the product. In the European Union, the European Medicines Agency Committee for Medicinal Products for Veterinary Use regulates both vaccines and pharmaceuticals.

The process of gaining regulatory approval for a veterinary pharmaceutical or vaccine requires a significant investment in time and money. To achieve regulatory approval, the manufacturer must demonstrate safety and effectiveness in the intended population, and the product must meet strict requirements for manufacturing to assure purity and activity.
