= Reversible inhibition of sperm under guidance =

Experimental male contraceptive injection

Diagram showing the site of injection of the product Vasalgel, a vasectomy alternative

Reversible inhibition of sperm under guidance (RISUG), formerly referred to as the synthetic polymer styrene maleic anhydride (SMA), is the development name of a male contraceptive injection developed at IIT Kharagpur in India by the team of Dr. Sujoy K. Guha.

RISUG has been patented in India, China, Bangladesh, and the United States. Phase III clinical trials in India were slowed by insufficient volunteers, and the results were published in 2023.

Beginning in 2011, a contraceptive product based on RISUG, Vasalgel, was under development in the US by the Parsemus Foundation, who were unable to bring the product to market over the next decade despite repeated assurances. In 2023, the patent for Vasalgel was acquired by NEXT Life Sciences, which plans to bring the technology to market under the name Plan A for Men.

== Development ==
Sujoy K. Guha developed RISUG after years of developing other inventions. He originally wanted to create an artificial heart that could pump blood using a strong electrical pulse. Using the 13-chamber model of a cockroach heart, he designed a softer pumping mechanism that would theoretically be safe to use in humans. As India's population grew throughout the 1970s, Guha modified his heart pump design to create a water pump that could work off of differences in ionic charges between salt water and fresh water in water treatment facilities. This filtration system did not require electricity and could potentially help large groups of people have access to clean water. India, however, decided that the population problem would be better served by developing more effective contraception. As such, Guha again modified his design to work safely inside the body, specifically inside the male genitalia. The non-toxic polymer of RISUG also uses differences in the charges of the semen to rupture the sperm as it flows through the vas deferens.

Intellectual property rights to RISUG in the United States were acquired between 2010 and 2012 by the Parsemus Foundation, a not-for-profit organization, which has branded it as "Vasalgel". Vasalgel was successful in achieving azoospermia in rabbits within 36 days of injection, as well as returned vas deferens patency. In 2023, the patent for Vasalgel was acquired by NEXT Life Sciences, Inc., developing it under the name Plan A for Men.

== Mechanisms ==
RISUG works by an injection into the vas deferens, the vessel through which the sperm moves before ejaculation. RISUG is similar to vasectomy in that a local anesthetic is administered, an incision is made in the scrotum, and the vasa deferentia are injected with a polymer gel (rather than being cut and cauterized). In a matter of minutes, the injection coats the walls of the vasa with a clear gel made of 60 mg of the copolymer styrene/maleic anhydride (SMA) with 120 μL of the solvent dimethyl sulfoxide. The copolymer is made by irradiation of the two monomers with a dose of 0.2 to 0.24 megarad for every 40 g of copolymer and a dose rate of 30 to 40 rad/s. Dr Pradeep K. Jha, a senior scientist, worked on the effects of gamma dose rate and total dose interrelation on molecular designing and biological function of polymer. The source of irradiation is cobalt-60 gamma radiation.

The effect the chemical has on sperm is not completely understood. Originally, researchers thought it lowered the pH of the environment enough to kill the sperm.

Guha theorizes that the polymer surface has a negative and positive electric charge mosaic. Within an hour after placement the differential charge from the gel will rupture the sperm's cell membrane as it passes through the vas, deactivating it before it can exit from the body.

== Safety ==
The thoroughness of carcinogenicity and toxicity testing in clinical trials had been questioned after phase I of clinical trials on the basis of presence of styrene and maleic anhydride in the formulation. In response, Guha argued that substances can be individually toxic in nature but harmless as compounds like pure chlorine, which can melt human flesh on its own, but, when combined with sodium, it becomes sodium chloride – the basic salt that people consume in their diets. When it did not persuade ICMR and the clinical trials did not resume by 1996, he went to the Supreme court and the next round of clinical trials resumed afterwards.

In October 2002, India's Ministry of Health aborted the clinical trials due to reports of albumin in urine and scrotal swelling in phase III trial participants. Although the ICMR has reviewed and approved the toxicology data three times, WHO and Indian researchers say that the studies were not done according to recent international standards. Due to the lack of any evidence for adverse effects, trials were restarted in 2011. Guha says concerns over the safety and efficacy of the drug have mainly come from the NIH and WHO.

== Availability and marketing ==
By November 2019, the ICMR had successfully completed clinical trials of the world's first injectable male contraceptive, which was then sent to the Drug Controller General of India (DCGI) for regulatory approval. The trials were over, including extended, phase III clinical trials, for which 303 candidates were recruited with 97.3% success rate and no reported side effects.

In the developed world, the average time taken for a drug to go from concept to market is 10 to 15 years, whereas it has been over four decades since Guha published his original paper on RISUG. RISUG aims to provide males with years-long fertility control, thereby overcoming compliance problems and avoiding ongoing costs associated with condoms and the female birth control pill, which must be taken daily.

Pharmaceutical companies have expressed little interest in RISUG. One obstacle facing marketing of the product is that men generally perceive contraception as a woman's issue. Men may choose not to use alternative methods of contraception because there are fewer options for birth control for them than there are for women, or they may fear the side effects, or it may conflict with their cultural or religious beliefs. However, the same study published that in the year 2000, an international survey found that 83% of men were willing to use a male contraceptive. Despite this, pharmaceutical companies are reluctant to lose market share of a thriving global market for female contraceptives and condoms which bring billions of dollars of revenue each year. Initially, RISUG attracted some interest from pharmaceutical companies. However, considering that RISUG is an inexpensive, one-time procedure, manufacturers retracted.

== Smart RISUG ==
Smart RISUG is a newer version of the male contraception that was published in 2009. The polymer adds iron oxide and copper particles to the original compound, giving it magnetic properties and the name "Smart RISUG". After injection the exact location of the polymer inside the vas deferens can be measured and visualized by X-ray and magnetic resonance imaging. The polymer location can also be externally controlled using a pulsed magnetic field. With this magnetic field, the polymer can change location inside the body to maximize sterility or can be removed to restore fertility. The polymer has magnetoelastic behavior that allows it to stretch and elongate to better line the vas deferens. The iron oxide component is necessary to prevent agglomeration.

With the presence of iron particles, the polymer has lower protein binding and therefore prevents agglomeration. The copper particles in the compound allow the polymer to conduct heat. When an external microwave applies heat to the polymer, it can liquify the polymer again to be excreted to restore fertility. Smart RISUG is therefore a better choice for men who want to use RISUG as temporary birth control, since it does not require a second surgery to restore fertility. The addition of metal ions also increases the effectiveness of the spermicide. The low frequency electromagnetic field disintegrates the sperm cell membrane in the head region. This in turn causes both acrosin and hyaluronidase enzymes to leak out of the sperm, making the sperm infertile.

The safety of Smart RISUG is uncertain and requires additional research. The spermicidal properties of the compound should not have negative effects on the lining of the vas deferens. Albino rats used to develop the new polymer did not have any adverse symptoms. The original compound had been tested for over 25 years in rats.
