= Gamendazole =

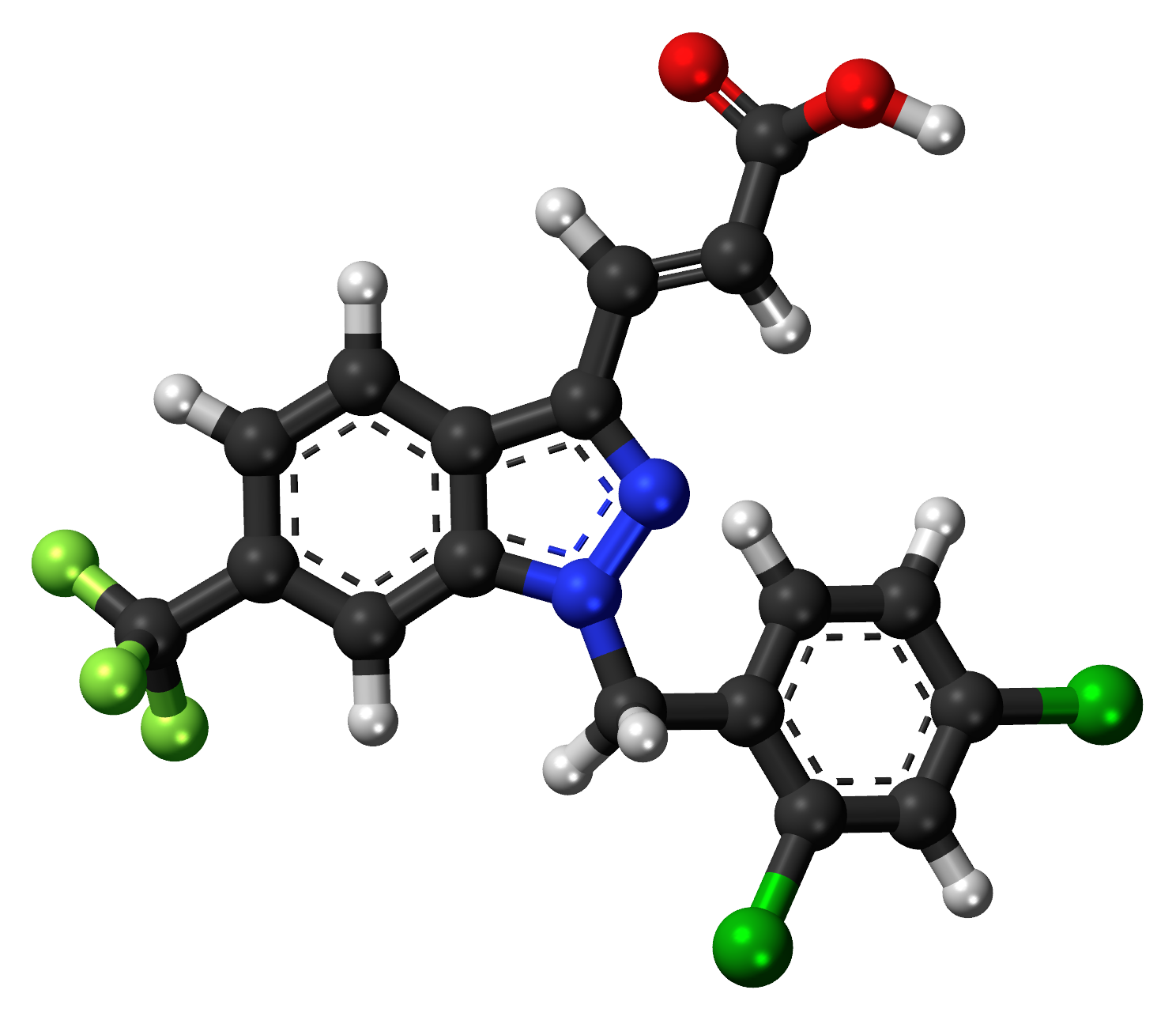

Names
- Preferred IUPAC name (2E)-3-{1-[(2,4-Dichlorophenyl)methyl]-6-(trifluoromethyl)-1H-indazol-3-yl}prop-2-enoic acid
- Other names trans-3-(1-Benzyl-6-(trifluoromethyl)-1H-indazol-3-yl)acrylic acid)

Identifiers
CAS Number	877766-45-5; 877773-32-5 (non-specific)
3D model (JSmol)	Interactive image
ChEBI	CHEBI:90703
ChemSpider	9387234
PubChem CID	11212172
UNII	X75Z3RSN5M
CompTox Dashboard (EPA)	DTXSID4042676
- InChI: InChI=1S/C18H11Cl2F3N2O2/c19-12-3-1-10(14(20)8-12)9-25-16-7-11(18(21,22)23)2-4-13(16)15(24-25)5-6-17(26)27/h1-8H,9H2,(H,26,27)/b6-5+ Key: KYYQMVUKYQCSQY-AATRIKPKSA-N; InChI=1/C18H11Cl2F3N2O2/c19-12-3-1-10(14(20)8-12)9-25-16-7-11(18(21,22)23)2-4-13(16)15(24-25)5-6-17(26)27/h1-8H,9H2,(H,26,27)/b6-5+ Key: KYYQMVUKYQCSQY-AATRIKPKBM
- SMILES: FC(F)(F)c1ccc2c(c1)n(nc2\C=C\C(=O)O)Cc3ccc(Cl)cc3Cl

Properties
Chemical formula	C_{18}H_{11}Cl_{2}F_{3}N_{2}O_{2}
Molar mass	415.19 g·mol^{−1}
- Except where otherwise noted, data are given for materials in their standard state (at 25 °C [77 °F], 100 kPa). verify (what is ?) Infobox references

Gamendazole is a drug candidate for male contraception. It is an indazole carboxylic acid derived from lonidamine (LND). It has been shown to reduce fertility in male rats without affecting testosterone levels, but human clinical trials have not been started.

== Rat studies ==
Gamendazole produced 100% antispermatogenic effects at 25 mg/kg i.p. in rats, whereas 200 mg/kg was fatal for 60% of rats tested. Since gamendazole produced 100% efficacy, it was tested orally. At a dose of 6 mg/kg, 100% of rats were infertile 4 weeks after a single administration. Complete infertility was maintained for 2 weeks, followed by complete recovery in 4 of 7 rats. The other 3 never recovered fertility. Upon dosing 6 mg/kg orally for 7 days, it produced similar infertility results, but only 2 of 7 rats recovered fertility. There were no abnormalities in rates of conception or abnormal conception in rats who recovered fertility.

Pathology reports were conducted on gamendazole treated rats. At 25 mg/kg i.p., 6 mg/kg oral, and in animals that survived 200 mg/kg i.p., there were no remarkable findings, with no evidence of inflammation, necrosis, tumors, or hemorrhage. There was also a lack of observable behavioral effects at 25 mg/kg i.p., 6 mg/kg oral, and in animals that survived 200 mg/kg i.p. Gamendazole treatment had no effect on testosterone levels, and was reported to affect Sertoli cell function, leading to decreased levels of inhibin B. Low levels of inhibin B were correlated to the infertility of the rat.
