= Neutering =

Removal of an animal's reproductive organ

Neutering, from the Latin neuter ('of neither sex'), is the removal of an animal's reproductive organ, either all of it or a considerably large part. The male-specific term is castration, while spaying is usually reserved for female animals. Colloquially, both terms are often referred to as fixing. In male horses, castrating is referred to as gelding. An animal that has not been neutered is sometimes referred to as entire or intact. Often the term neuter[ing] is used to specifically mean castration, e.g. in phrases like "spay and neuter".

Neutering is the most common method for animal sterilization. Humane societies, animal shelters, and rescue groups urge pet owners to have their pets neutered to prevent the births of unwanted litters, which contribute to the overpopulation of unwanted animals in the rescue system. Many countries require that all adopted cats and dogs be sterilized before going to their new homes.

== Methods of sterilization ==
=== Females (spaying) ===
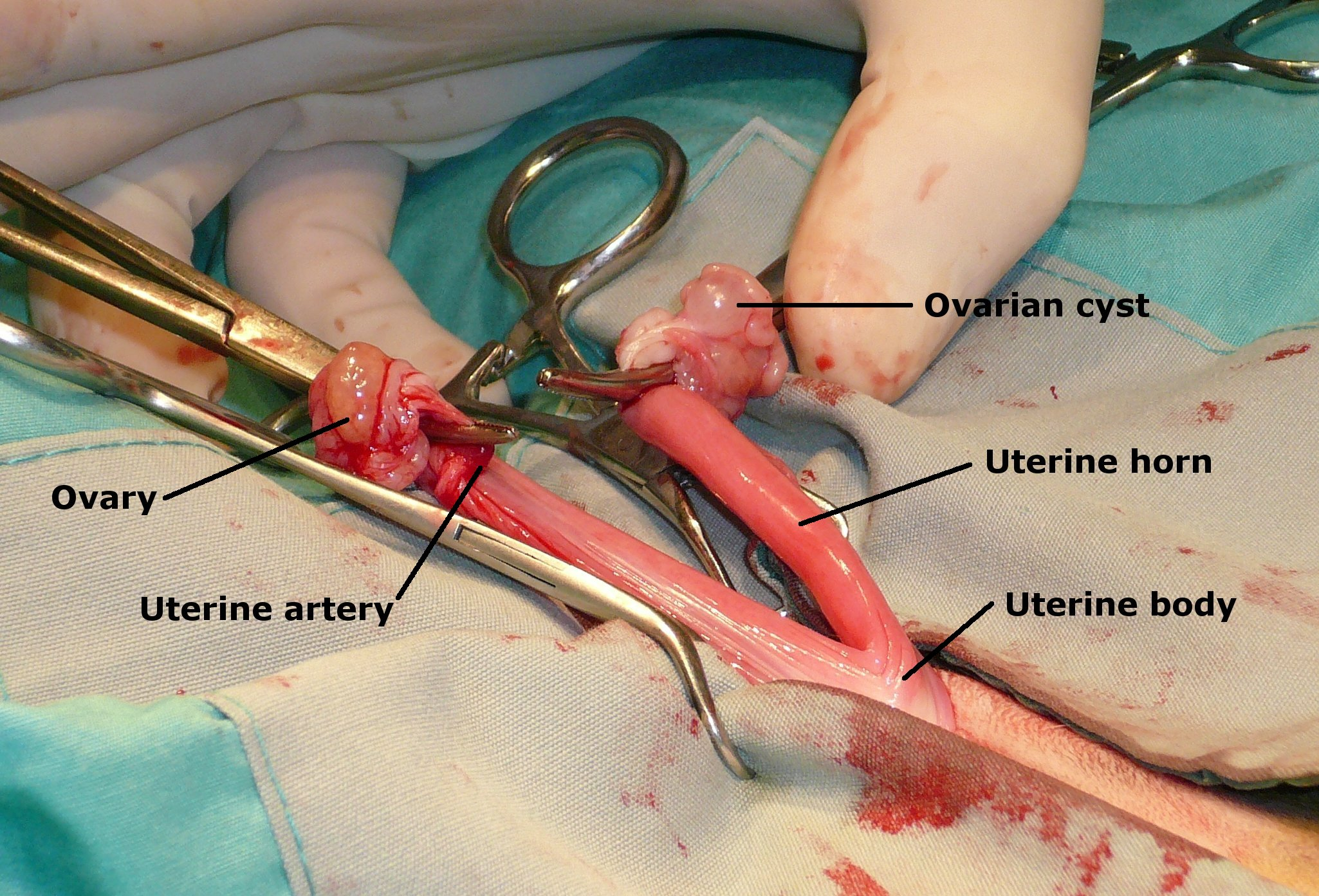
Feline uterus

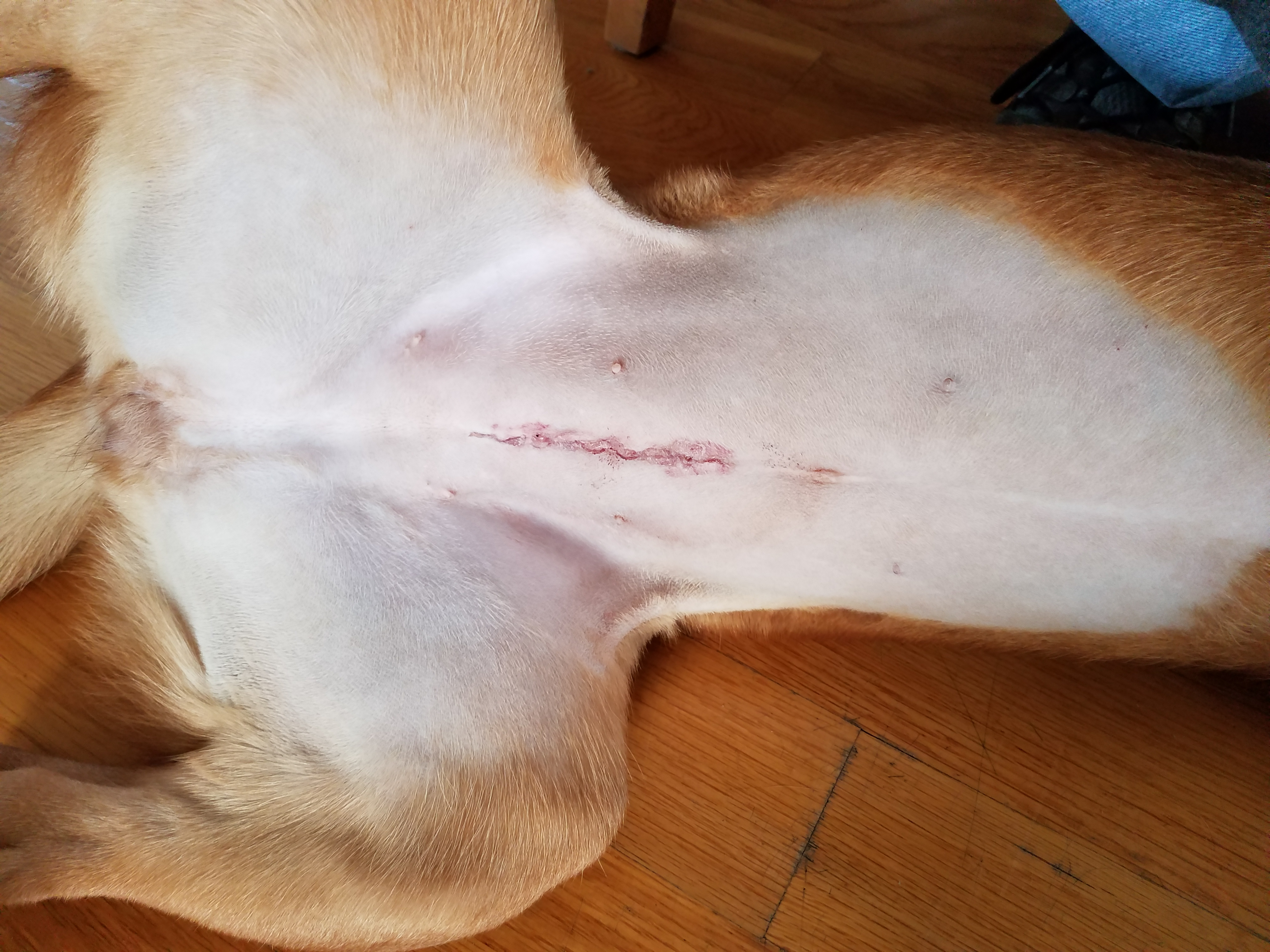
Closed spaying incision on a female dog, taken 24 hours after surgery

Spaying is the surgical removal of the ovaries and sometimes uterus in female animals. It is commonly performed as a method of birth control, behavior modification, or emergency removal of damaged ovaries.

In non-human animals, the technical term is an ovo-hysterectomy or ovariohysterectomy; while in humans, this is called a hystero-oophorectomy. One form of spaying is to remove only the ovaries (oophorectomy or ovariectomy), which is mainly done in cats and young dogs as well as in laparoscopic procedures. Another, less commonly performed method is an "ovary-sparing spay" in which the uterus is removed but one (or both) ovaries are left. A complete ovariohysterectomy may involve removal of the ovaries, uterus, oviducts, and uterine horns with the use of tools such as the Snook hook.

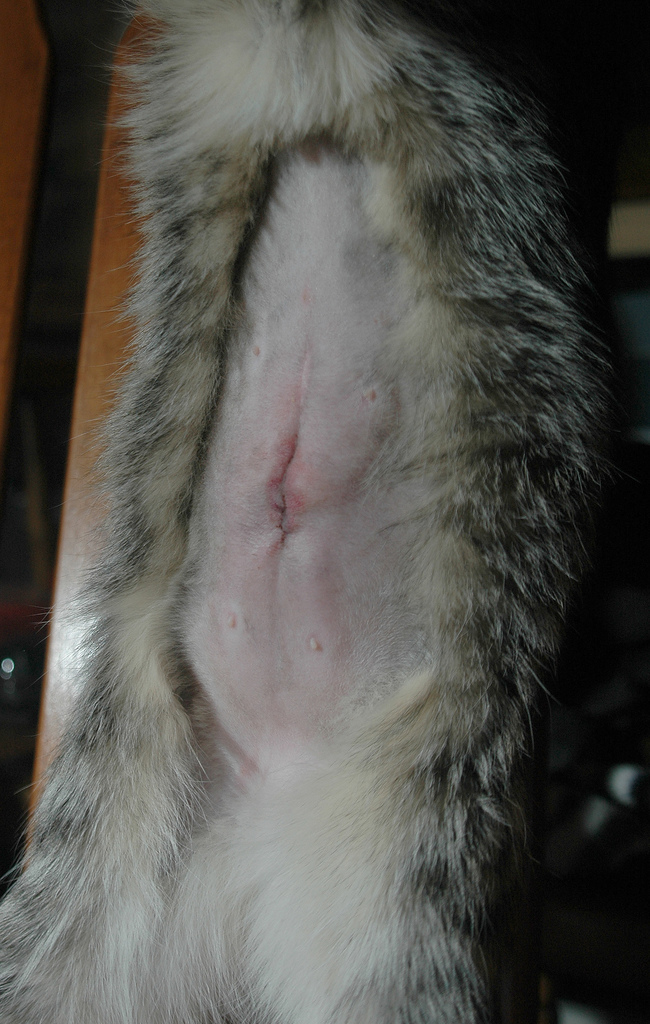
Surgical incision site of a female cat

The surgery can be performed using a traditional open approach or by laparoscopic "keyhole" surgery. Open surgery is more widely available, as laparoscopic surgical equipment costs are expensive. Traditional open surgery is usually performed through a ventral midline incision below the umbilicus. The incision size varies depending upon the surgeon and the size of the animal. The uterine horns are identified and the ovaries are found by following the horns to their ends.

There is a ligament that attaches the ovaries to the body wall, which may need to be broken down so the ovaries can be identified. The ovarian arteries are then ligated with resorbable suture material and then the arteries transected. The uterine body (which is very short in litter-bearing species) and related arteries are also tied off just in front of the cervix (leaving the cervix as a natural barrier). The entire uterus and ovaries are then removed. The abdomen is checked for bleeding and then closed with a three-layer closure. The linea alba and then the subcutaneous layer are closed with resorbable suture material. The skin is then stapled, sutured, or glued closed. For suturing the feline linea alba, the most appropriate suture bite and stitch interval size was suggested to be 5 mm.

Laparoscopic surgery is performed using a camera and instruments placed through small incisions (ports) in the body wall. The patient is under anaesthesia and lying on the back. The incisions are between 5 and 10 millimetres (0.20 and 0.39 in) and the number varies according to the equipment and technique used. The surgeon watches on a screen during the operation. The first port is made just behind the umbilicus and the camera is inserted. The abdomen is inflated with carbon dioxide gas to create a space in which to operate. A second port is introduced a few centimeters in front of the navel and a long grasping instrument called a Babcock forceps is inserted. The surgeon finds the ovary with the instrument and uses it to suspend the ovary from a needle placed through the abdominal wall. This lifts the ovary and uterus safely away from other organs. The surgeon then removes the grasping instrument and replaces it with an instrument that cauterizes and cuts tissue. This instrument uses electricity to heat the blood vessels to seal them and to cut them. No sutures are placed inside. The ovary is separated from the uterus and round ligament. The cautery instrument is removed and replaced by the grasping instrument, which is used to pull the ovary out through the small abdominal incision (port). This is repeated on the other side and the small holes are closed with a few sutures. Another method uses ligatures and even the uterus is removed.

The benefits of laparoscopic surgery are less pain, faster recovery, and smaller wounds to heal. A study has shown that patients are 70% more active in the first three days post-surgery compared to open surgery. The reason open surgery is more painful is that larger incisions are required, and the ovary needs to be pulled out of the body, which stretches and tears tissue in the abdomen (it is not uncommon for patients to react under anaesthesia by breathing faster at this point).

Removing the ovaries in female dogs removes the production of progesterone, which is a natural calming hormone and a serotonin uplifter. Spaying may therefore escalate any observable aggressive behaviour, either to humans or other dogs.

The risk of infections, bleeding, ruptures, inflammation and reactions to the drugs given to the animal as part of the procedure are all possibilities that should be considered.

=== Males (castration) ===
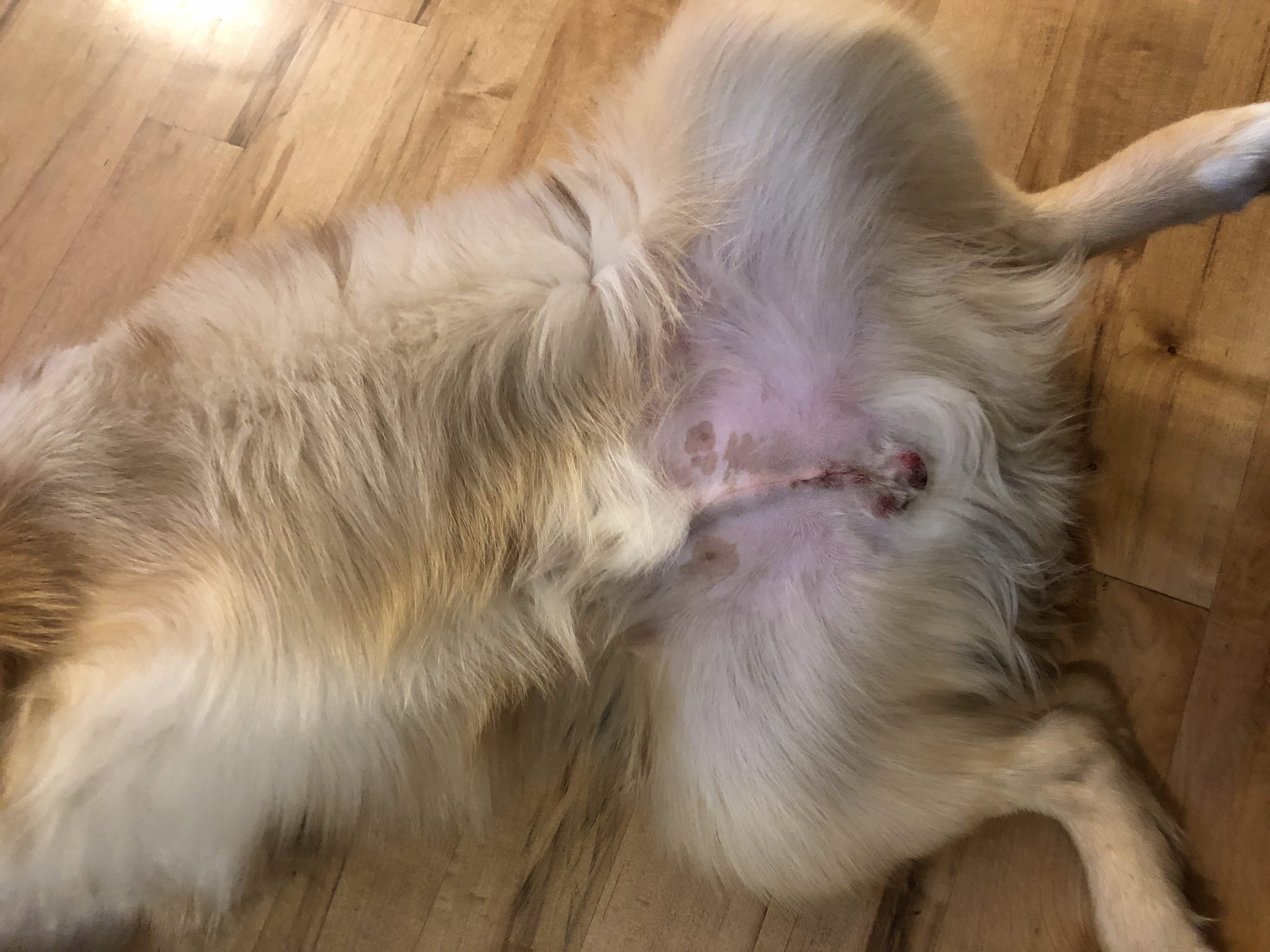
Closed castration incision on a male dog, taken 12 hours after surgery

In male animals, castration involves the removal of the testes (testicles), and is commonly practiced on both household pets (for birth control and behaviour modification) and on livestock (for birth control, as well as to improve commercial value). Often the term neutering is used to specifically mean castration, e.g. in phrases like "spay and neuter".

=== Sterilization alternatives ===
==== Hormone-Sparing Surgery ====
Vasectomy: In a more delicate procedure than castration, the vasa deferentia – ducts that run from the testes to the penis – are cut then tied or sealed, to prevent sperm from entering into the urethra. Failure rates are insignificantly small. Breeders routinely have this procedure carried out on male ferrets and sheep to manipulate the estrus cycles of in-contact females. It is uncommon in other animal species. Because a vasectomy is usually a more expensive procedure, among pet-keepers it is more often performed on show animals, to cosmetically preserve their appearance (though depending upon the fancier organization, the procedure may invalidate the animal's candidacy for certain awards, or relegate it to a non-pedigree, generic "household pet" competition division, just as with full castration).

Tubal ligation: Snipping and tying of oviducts as a sterilization measure can be performed on female cats, dogs, and other species; it is essentially the female equivalent of vasectomy, but a more invasive procedure. Risk of unwanted pregnancies is insignificantly small. Only a few veterinarians perform the procedure.

Like other forms of neutering, vasectomy and tubal ligation eliminate the ability to produce offspring. They differ from neutering in that they leave the animal's levels and patterns of sex hormone unchanged. Both sexes will retain their normal reproductive behavior, and other than birth control, none of the advantages and disadvantages listed below apply. This method is favored by some people who seek minimal infringement on the natural state of companion animals to achieve the desired reduction of unwanted births of cats and dogs.

===== Injectable =====
- Male dogs – Two intratesticular injectable formulations are known to sterilize male dogs. Zeuterin was approved by the United States Food and Drug Administration (FDA) for permanent sterilization of male dogs ages three months and older by causing necrosis of the testicle. It is not currently available commercially. Calcium chloride dissolved in a variety of diluents have also been studied, with the majority of research and most promising results using calcium chloride dissolved in ethyl alcohol. Calcium chloride formulations can be purchased for use in animals from compounding pharmacies, but the use of calcium chloride for sterilization of males is not approved by the FDA or any other international regulatory agency.
- Male cats – Calcium chloride formulations have also been studied in male cats.
- Male rats – Adjudin (analogue of indazole-carboxylic acid), induces reversible germ cell loss from the seminiferous epithelium by disrupting cell adhesion function between nurse cells and immature sperm cells, preventing maturation.
- Male mice – injection of a solution of the JQ1 molecule to bind to a pocket of BRDT necessary for chromatin remodeling, which gives the proteins that regulate how genes act access to the genetic material
- Male sheep and pigs – Wireless Microvalve. A proposed non-chemical, reversible sterilization method using a piezoelectric polymer that will deform when exposed to a specific electric field broadcast from an emitter. The valve will then open or close, preventing the passage of sperm, but not seminal fluid. Located in a section of the vas deferens that occurs just after the epididymis, the implantation can be carried out by use of a hypodermic needle.
- Female mammals – Vaccine of antigens (derived from purified porcine zona pellucida) encapsulated in liposomes (cholesterol and lecithin) with an adjuvant, latest US patent RE37,224 (as of 2006-06-06), CA patent 2137263 (issued 1999-06-15). Product commercially known as SpayVac, a single injection causes a treated female mammal to produce antibodies that bind to ZP3 on the surface of her ovum, blocking sperm from fertilizing it for periods from 22 months up to 7 years (depending on the animal). This will not prevent the animal from going into heat (ovulating) and other than birth control, none of the advantages or disadvantages mentioned below apply.

==== Other ====
- Male mice – reversible regulation of the KATNAL1 gene in the Sertoli cell microtubule dynamics of the testes.
- Female mammals – orally administered phosphodiesterase 3 inhibitor ORG 9935 daily before and during ovulation, which blocks the resumption of meiosis resulting in ovulation of a non-fertilizable, immature oocyte without rupturing the follicle.

"Gomerization" is breeders' informal term for surgical techniques by which male livestock, such as bulls, retain their full libido (and related effects like sex pheromones that would be lost through castration), but are rendered incapable of copulation. This is done to stimulate and identify estrous females without the risk of transmitting venereal diseases or causing a pregnancy by a male other than the one intended for selective breeding. Animals altered for this purpose are referred to as teasers (teaser bulls, etc.), or gomers. Several methods are used. Penile translocation surgically alters the penis to point far enough away from its normal direction that it cannot manage vaginal penetration. Penile fixation permanently attaches the penis to the abdomen so that it cannot be lowered for penetration. Penectomy is the partial or complete removal of the penis.

== Early-age neutering ==
Early-age neutering, also known as pediatric spaying or prepubertal gonadectomy, is the removal of the ovaries or testes before the onset of puberty. It is used mainly in animal sheltering and rescue where puppies and kittens can be neutered before being adopted out, eliminating non-compliance with sterilization agreement, which is typically above 40%. The American Veterinary Medical Association, American Animal Hospital Association and the Canadian Veterinary Medical Association support the procedure for population control, provided that the veterinarian uses their best knowledge when making the decision about the age at neutering. A task force recommends that cats are spayed–neutered prior to 5 months of age.

While the age-unrelated risks and benefits cited above also apply to early-age neutering, various studies have indicated that the procedure is safe and not associated with increased mortality or serious health and behavioral problems when compared to conventional age neutering. Anesthesia recovery in young animals is usually more rapid and there are fewer complications. One study found that in female dogs there is an increasing risk of urinary incontinence the earlier the procedure is carried out; the study recommended that female dogs be spayed no earlier than 3 to 4 months of age. A later study comparing female dogs spayed between 4 and 6 months and after 6 months showed no increased risk.

One study showed the incidence of hip dysplasia increased to 6.7% for dogs neutered before 5.5 months compared to 4.7% for dogs neutered after 5.5 months, although the cases associated with early age neutering seems to be of a less severe form. There was no association between age of neutering and arthritis or long-bone fractures. Another study showed no correlation between age of neutering and musculoskeletal problems. A study of large breed dogs with cranial cruciate ligament rupture associated early-age neutering with the development of an excessive tibial plateau angle.

Of particular note are two recent studies from Lynette Hart's lab at UC Davis. The first study from 2013, published in a well-known interdisciplinary peer-reviewed journal demonstrated "no cases of CCL (cruciate ligament tear) diagnosed in intact males or females, but in early-neutered males and females the occurrences were 5 percent and 8 percent, respectively. Almost 10 percent of early-neutered males were diagnosed with LSA (lymphosarcoma), 3 times more than intact males. The percentage of HSA (hemangiosarcoma) cases in late-neutered females (about 8 percent) was 4 times more than intact and early-neutered females. There were no cases of MCT (mast cell tumor) in intact females, but the occurrence was nearly 6 percent in late-neutered females".

The second study from 2014 highlighted significant difference in closely related breeds (retrievers), suggesting that inter-breed variability is quite high and that sweeping legal measures and surgical mandates are not the best solutions to canine welfare and health. Specifically the study states: "In Labrador Retrievers, where about 5 percent of gonadally intact males and females had one or more joint disorders, neutering at 6 months doubled the incidence of one or more joint disorders in both sexes. In male and female Golden Retrievers, with the same 5 percent rate of joint disorders in intact dogs, neutering at 6 months increased the incidence of a joint disorder to 4–5 times that of intact dogs. The incidence of one or more cancers in female Labrador Retrievers increased slightly above the 3 percent level of intact females with neutering. In contrast, in female Golden Retrievers, with the same 3 percent rate of one or more cancers in intact females, neutering at all periods through 8 years of age increased the rate of at least one of the cancers by 3–4 times. In male Golden and Labrador Retrievers neutering had relatively minor effects in increasing the occurrence of cancers."

In terms of behavior in dogs, separation anxiety, aggression, escape behavior and inappropriate elimination are reduced with neutering while noise phobia and sexual behavior has been shown to potentially increase. In males with aggression issues, earlier neutering may increase barking. In cats, asthma, gingivitis, and hyperactivity were decreased, while shyness was increased. In male cats, occurrence of abscesses, aggression toward veterinarians, sexual behaviors, and urine spraying was decreased, while hiding was increased.

== Health and behavioral effects ==
=== Advantages ===
Besides being a birth control method, and being convenient to many owners, castrating/spaying has the following health benefits:

- Sexually dimorphic behaviors such as mounting and urine spraying are reduced due to the decrease in hormone levels brought about by neutering. In species other than dogs, certain forms of male aggression are also reduced. Sexual behavior in cats seems to make them especially undesirable to pet owners.
- Early spaying significantly reduces the risk of development of mammary tumours in female dogs. The incidence of mammary tumours in un-spayed female dogs is 71% (of which approximately 50% will be malignant and 50% will be benign), but if a dog is spayed before its first heat cycle, the risk of developing a mammary tumour is reduced to 0.35%—a 99.5% reduction. The positive effects of spaying on reduction of later mammary tumours decreases with each heat the dog has (backing up the contention that the greatest benefit to reduce future mammary tumour development is to spay before the first heat), and there is no added benefit to spaying to reduce recurrence of a mammary tumour once it has been diagnosed.
- Neutering increases life expectancy in cats: one study found castrated male cats live 62% longer than intact males, while spayed female cats live 39% longer than intact females. Non-neutered cats in the U.S. are three times more likely to require treatment for an animal bite. Having a cat neutered confers health benefits, because castrated males cannot develop testicular cancer, spayed females cannot develop uterine, cervical or ovarian cancer, and both have a reduced risk of mammary cancer.
- Without the ability to reproduce, a female necessarily has zero risk of pregnancy complications, such as spotting and false pregnancy, the latter of which can occur in more than 50% of unspayed female dogs.
- Pyometra, uterine cancer, ovarian cancer, and testicular cancer are prevented, as the susceptible organs are removed, though stump pyometra may still occur in spayed females.
- Pyometra (or a pus filled womb) ('Pyo' = pus; 'metra' = uterus or womb) is a life-threatening condition that requires emergency veterinary treatment. The risk of a non-spayed female dog developing pyometra by age 10 is 25% across all breeds, but can be as high as 54% in some breeds. The treatment of choice for a closed-pyometra (where the cervix is closed and the pus cannot drain) is admission to hospital, commencement on intravenous fluids and appropriate antibiotics and, once stable enough for the anaesthetic and surgery, emergency removal of the infected pus-filled uterus. Medical management can be attempted if the animal's condition allows (for example in the case of an 'open' pyometra where the pus drains per-vaginum from the uterus via the open cervix) or dictates (where the animal is too old or otherwise unwell to withstand surgery), if the owner wishes to keep the dog entire to breed or if the owner is unable to afford the veterinary fees associated with surgery. Emergency removal of the infected uterus carries a much higher degree of risk of death than a routine 'spay' operation. The risk of death from in dogs undergoing surgical treatment for pyometra is up to 17%. Thus the risk of death in entire female dogs from a pyometra, even if given correct veterinary attention can be up to 9% by 10 years of age (17% of 54%). This risk is reduced to virtually zero if spayed.

=== Disadvantages ===
- As with any surgical procedure, immediate complications of neutering include the usual anesthetic and surgical complications, such as bleeding, infection, and death. These risks are relatively low in routine neutering; however, they may be increased for some animals due to other pre-existing health factors. In one study the risk of anesthetic-related death (not limited to neutering procedures) was estimated at 0.05% for healthy dogs and 0.11% for healthy cats. The risks for sick animals were 1.33% for dogs and 1.40% for cats.
- Spaying and castrating cats and dogs may increase the risk of obesity if nutritional intake is not reduced to reflect the lower metabolic requirements of neutered animals. In cats, a decrease in sex hormone levels seems to be associated with an increase in food intake. In dogs, the effects of neutering as a risk factor for obesity vary among breeds.
- Neutered dogs of both sexes are at a twofold excess risk to develop osteosarcoma (bone cancer) as compared to intact dogs. The risk of osteosarcoma increases with increasing breed size and especially height.
- Studies of cardiac tumors in dogs showed that there was a 5 times greater risk of hemangiosarcoma (cancer of blood vessel lining), one of the three most common cancers in dogs, in spayed females than intact females and a 2.4 times greater risk of hemangiosarcoma in castrated dogs as compared to intact males.
- Spaying and castrating is associated with an increase in urinary tract cancers in dogs, however the risk is still less than 1%.
- Neutered dogs of both sexes have a 27% to 38% increased risk of adverse reactions to vaccinations. However, the incidence of adverse reactions for neutered and intact dogs combined is only 0.32%.
- Neutered dogs have been known to develop hormone-responsive alopecia (hair loss).
- A 2004 study found that neutered dogs had a higher incidence of cranial cruciate ligament (CCL) rupture, a form of anterior cruciate ligament (ACL) injury.
- A study of golden retrievers found that castrated males were 3 times more likely than intact males to be diagnosed with lymphoma and 2 times more likely to have hip dysplasia.
- Castration and spaying can increase the risk of geriatric cognitive impairment.
- About 2% of castrated male dogs eventually develop prostate cancer, compared to less than 0.6% of intact males. The evidence is most conclusive for Bouviers.
- In a study of 29 intact male dogs and 47 castrated males aged 11–14, the neutered males were significantly more likely to progress from one geriatric cognitive impairment condition (out of the four conditions – disorientation in the house or outdoors, changes in social interactions with human family members, loss of house training, and changes in the sleep-wake cycle) to two or more conditions. Testosterone in intact males is thought to slow the progression of cognitive impairment, at least in dogs that already have mild impairment.
- As compared to intact males, castrated cats are at an increased risk for certain problems associated with feline lower urinary tract disease. They are much more likely to suffer from feline cystitis which can escalate into a life-threatening urethral blockage.
- Neutering has been associated with an increased likelihood of urethral sphincter incontinence in male dogs.
- There is evidence that spaying can increase the risk of urinary incontinence in dogs, especially when done before the age of three months. Up until 12 months of age, the risk decreases as the age at spaying increases.
- Spayed female dogs are at an increased risk of hypothyroidism.

=== Current research ===
Various studies of the effects neutering has overall on male and female dog aggression have been unable to arrive at a consensus. A possible reason for this according to two studies is changes to other factors have more of an effect than neutering. One study reported results of aggression towards familiar and strange people and other dogs reduced between 10 and 60 percent of cases, while other studies reported increases in possessive aggression and aggression towards familiar and strange people, and more studies reported there was no significant difference in aggression risk between neutered and non-neutered males. For females with existing aggression, many studies reported increases in aggressive behavior and some found increased separation anxiety behavior. A report from the American Kennel Club Canine Health Foundation reported significantly more behavioral problems in castrated dogs. The most commonly observed behavioral problem in spayed females was fearful behavior and the most common problem in males was aggression. Early age gonadectomy is associated with an increased incidence of noise phobias and undesirable sexual behaviors.

== Terminology for neutered animals ==
A specialized vocabulary is used in animal husbandry and animal fancy for neutered (castrated) animals:

barrow
Pig castrated before maturity.
bullock
Male castrated draft animal.
capon
Male castrated chicken.
gelding
Male castrated horse, or donkey.
gib
Male castrated cat, or ferret.
havier
Male castrated deer.
lapin
Male castrated rabbit.
ox
Male castrated draft animal.
spay
Female neutered cat.
poulard
Female spayed chicken.
sprite
Female neutered ferret.
steer
Male cattle castrated before maturity.
stag
Male cattle or pig castrated after maturity.
wether
Male castrated goat or sheep.

== Religious views ==
=== Islam ===
There are differing views in Islam with regard to neutering animals, with some Islamic associations stating that when done to maintain the health and welfare of both the animals and the community, neutering is allowed on the basis of being in the interest of 'maslaha' (general good) or "choosing the lesser of two evils".

=== Judaism ===
Orthodox Judaism forbids the castration of both humans and non-human animals by Jews, except in lifesaving situations. In 2007, the Sephardic Chief Rabbi of Israel Rabbi Shlomo Amar issued a ruling stating that it is permissible to have companion animals neutered on the basis of the Jewish mandate to prevent cruelty to animals.

== See also ==
- Animal population control
- Animal shelter
- Cruelty to animals
- Hysterectomy
- Non-surgical fertility control for dogs and cats
- Oophorectomy
- Overpopulation in companion animals
- Wildlife contraceptive
- World Spay Day
