= Soluble adenylyl cyclase =

Regulatory cytosolic enzyme

Soluble adenylyl cyclase (sAC) is a regulatory cytosolic enzyme present in almost every cell. sAC is a source of cyclic adenosine 3',5' monophosphate (cAMP) – a second messenger that mediates cell growth and differentiation in organisms from bacteria to higher eukaryotes. sAC differentiates from the transmembrane adenylyl cyclase (tmACs) – an important source of cAMP; in that sAC is regulated by bicarbonate anions and it is dispersed throughout the cell cytoplasm. sAC has been found to have various functions in physiological systems different from that of the tmACs.

== Genomic context and summary ==
Gene Structure: Chromosome: 1; NC_000001.10 (167778625..167883453, complement)

sAC is encoded in a single Homo sapiens gene identified as ADCY10 or Adenylate cyclase 10 (soluble). This gene packed down 33 exons that comprise greater than 100kb; though, it seems to utilize multiple promoters, and its mRNA undergoes extensive alternative splicing.

== Structure ==
The functional mammalian sAC consist of two heterologous catalytic domains (C1 and C2), forming the 50 kDa amino terminus of the protein. The additional ~140 kDa C terminus of the enzyme includes an autoinhibitory region, canonical P-loop, potential heme-binding domain, and leucine zipper-like sequence, which are a form of putative regulatory domains.

A truncated form of the enzyme only includes the C1 and C2 domains and it is refers to as the minimal functional sAC variant. This sAC-truncated form has cAMP-forming activity much higher than its full-length type. These sAC variants are stimulated by HCO3- and respond to all known selective sAC inhibitors. Crystal structures of this sAC variant comprising only the catalytic core, in apo form and in as complex with various substrate analogs, products, and regulators, reveal a generic Class III AC architecture with sAC-specific features. The structurally related domains C1 and C2 form the typical pseudo-heterodimer, with one active site. The pseudo-symmetric site accommodates the sAC-specific activator HCO3−, which activates by triggering a rearrangement of Arg176, a residue connecting both sites. The anionic sAC inhibitor 4,4′-diisothiocyanatostilbene-2,2′-disulfonic acid (DIDS) acts as a blocker for the entrance to active site and bicarbonate binding pocket.

== Activation by bicarbonate (HCO^{−}_{3}) and calcium (Ca^{2+}) ==
The binding and cyclizing of adenosine 5' triphosphate (ATP) to the catalytic active site of the enzyme is coordinated by two metal cations. The catalytic activity of sAC is increase by the presence of manganese [Mn^{2+}]. sAC magnesium [Mg^{2+}] activity is regulated by calcium [Ca^{2+}] which increases the affinity for ATP of mammalian sAC. In addition, bicarbonate [HCO^{−}_{3}] releases ATP-Mg^{2+} substrate inhibition and increases V_{max} of the enzyme.

The open conformation state of sAC is reached when ATP, with Ca^{2+} bound to its γ-phosphate binds with specific residues in the catalytic center of the enzyme. When the second metal – a Mg^{2+} ion – binds to the α-phosphate of ATP leads to a conformational change of the enzyme: the close state. The change in conformation from open to close state induces esterification of the α-phosphate with the ribose in adenosine and the release of the β- and γ-phosphates, this leads to cyclizing. Hydrogencarbonate stimulates the enzyme's V_{max} by promoting the allosteric change that leads to active site closure, recruitment of the catalytic Mg^{2+} ion, and readjustment of the phosphates in the bound ATP. The activator bicarbonate binds to a site pseudo-symmetric to the active site and triggers conformational changes by recruiting Arg176 from the active site (see above - "structure"). Calcium increases substrate affinity by replacing the magnesium in the ion B site, which provides an anchoring point for the beta- and gamma-phosphates of the ATP substrate.

=== Sources of bicarbonate (HCO^{−}_{3})and calcium (Ca^{2+}) ===
- bicarbonate derived from carbonic anhydrase (CA)-dependent hydration.
- CO_{2} metabolism
- Enters through membrane-transporting proteins or cystic fibrosis transmembrane conductance regulators.
- Calcium enters by voltage-dependent Ca^{2+} channels or by release from the endoplasmic reticulum.
- Hydrogencarbonate and calcium activates sAC in the nucleus.
- sAC inside mitochondria is activated by metabolically generated CO_{2} through carbonic anhydrase.

== Physiological effects ==
=== Brain and nervous system ===
Astrocytes express several sAC splice variants, which are involved in metabolic coupling between neurons and astrocytes. Increase of potassium [K^{+}] in the extracellular space caused by neuronal activity depolarizes the cell membrane of nearby astrocytes and facilitates the entry of hydrogencarbonate through Na^{+}/HCO^{−}_{3}- cotransporters. The increase in cytosolic hydrogencarbonate activates sAC; the result of this activation is the release of lactate for use as energy source by the neurons.

=== Bone ===
Numerous sAC splice variants are present in osteoclast and osteoblasts, and mutation in the human sAC gene is associated with low spinal density. Calcification by osteoblasts is intrinsically related with bicarbonate and calcium. Bone density experiments in mouse calvaria cultured indicates that HCO^{−}_{3}-sensing sAC is a physiological appropriate regulator of bone formation and/or reabsorption.

=== Sperm ===
sAC activation by bicarbonate is necessary for motility and other aspects of capacitation in the spermatozoa of mammals. In human males, mutations in the ADCY10 gene that lead to the inactivation of sAC have been linked to cases of sterility. Due to this essential role in male fertility, sAC has been explored as a potential target for non-hormonal male contraception.
