= Male contraceptive =

Pregnancy prevention methods used by men

Male contraceptives, also known as male birth control, are methods of preventing pregnancy by interrupting the function of sperm. The most commonly used forms of male contraception are condoms, vasectomy, and withdrawal, which together represented 20% of global contraceptive use in 2019. New forms of male contraception are in research and development, but as of 2025, none have achieved regulatory approval for widespread use. They could be available before 2030, assuming smooth development and clinical trials.

These new methods include topical creams, daily pills, injections, long-acting implants, and external devices, with both hormonal and non-hormonal mechanisms of action. Some could even be unisex, or usable by any person, because they could theoretically incapacitate mature sperm in the man's body before ejaculation, or incapacitate sperm in the body of a woman after insemination.

== Background ==
In the 21st century, surveys indicated that around half of men in countries across the world have been interested in using a variety of novel contraceptive methods, and men in clinical trials for male contraceptives have reported high levels of satisfaction with the products. Women worldwide have also shown a high level of interest in new male contraceptives, and though both male and female partners could use their own contraceptives simultaneously, women in long-term relationships have indicated a high degree of trust in their male partner's ability to successfully manage contraceptive use.

A modelling study from 2018 suggested that even partial adoption of new male contraceptives would significantly reduce unintended pregnancy rates around the globe, which remain at nearly 50%, even in developed countries where women have access to modern contraceptives. Unintended pregnancies are associated with negative socioeconomic, educational, and health outcomes for women, men, and the resulting children (especially in historically marginalized communities), and 60% of unintended pregnancies end in abortions, many of which are unsafe and can lead to women's harm or death. Therefore, the development of new male contraceptives has the potential to improve racial, economic, and gender equality across the world, advance reproductive justice and reproductive autonomy for all people, and save lives.

== Available methods ==
=== Vasectomy ===
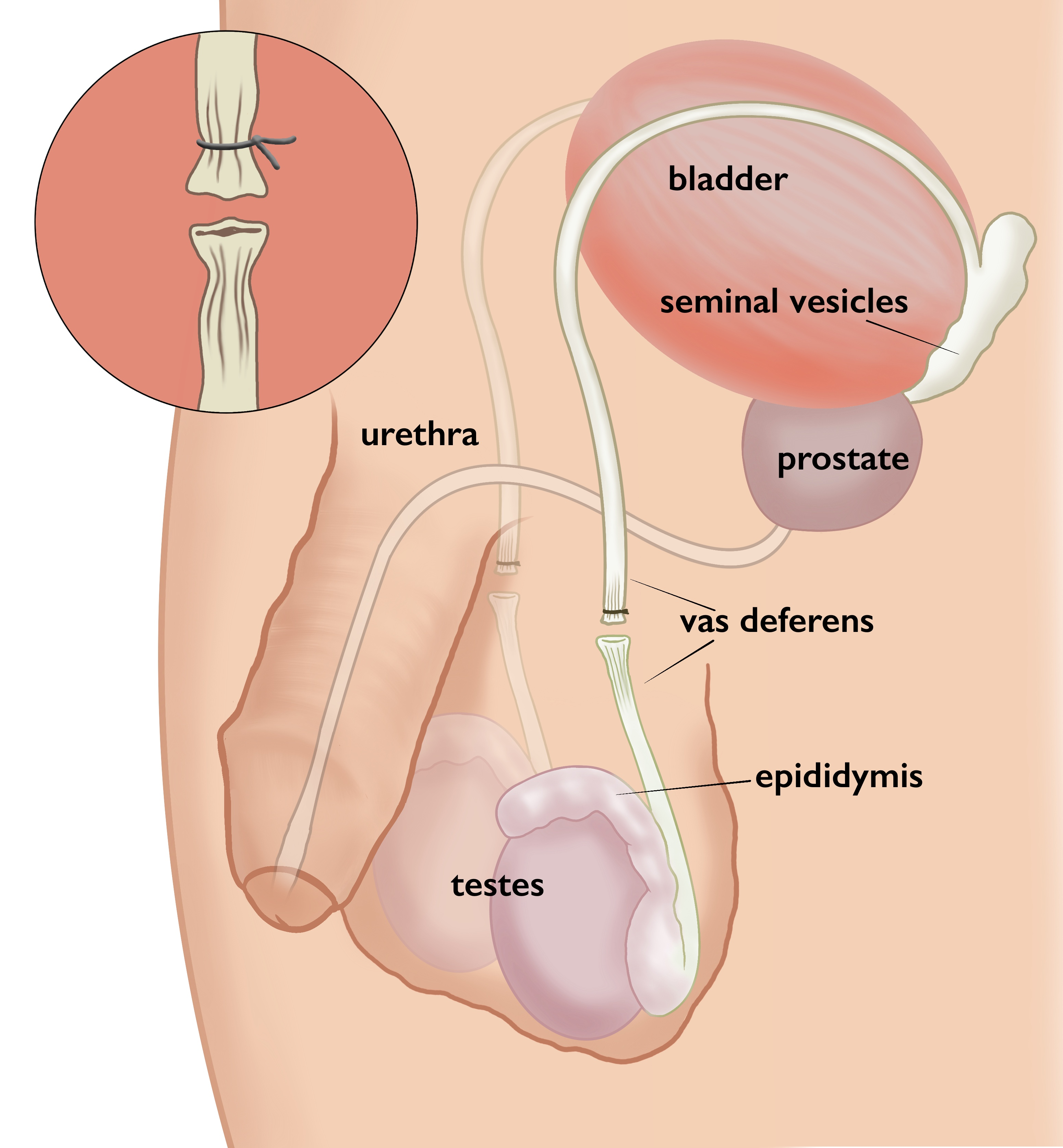
Diagram of an open vasectomy

Vasectomy is surgical procedure for permanent male sterilization usually performed in a physician's office in an outpatient procedure. During the procedure, the vasa deferentia of a patient are severed, and then tied or sealed to prevent sperm from being released during ejaculation. Vasectomy is an effective procedure, with less than 0.15% of partners becoming pregnant within the first 12 months after the procedure. Vasectomy is also a widely reliable and safe method of contraception, and complications are both rare and minor. Vasectomies can be reversed, though rates of successful reversal decline as the time since vasectomy increases, and the procedure is technically difficult and often costly.

=== Condoms ===
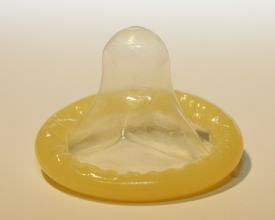
A rolled-up condom

A condom is a barrier device made of latex or thin plastic film that is rolled onto an erect penis before intercourse and retains ejaculated semen, thereby preventing pregnancy. Condoms are less effective at preventing pregnancy than vasectomy or modern methods of female contraception, with a real-world failure rate of 13%. However, condoms have the advantage of providing protection against some sexually transmitted infections such as HIV/AIDS. Condoms may be combined with other forms of contraception (such as spermicide) for greater protection.

=== Withdrawal ===
The withdrawal method, also known as coitus interruptus or pulling out, is a behavior that involves halting penile-vaginal intercourse to remove the penis out and away from the vagina prior to ejaculation. Withdrawal is considered a less-effective contraceptive method, with typical-use failure rates around 20%. However, it requires no equipment or medical procedures.

Contraceptive Failure Rate (Note: The percentage of users of each method who will experience an unintended pregnancy in the first year of use of the method.)
Method	Typical use	Perfect use
Vasectomy	0.15%	0.10%
Condoms	13%	2%
Withdrawal	20%	4%

== Research ==
Researchers have been working to generate novel male contraceptives with diverse mechanisms of action and possible delivery methods, including long-acting reversible contraceptives (LARCs), daily transdermal gels, daily and on-demand oral pills, monthly injectables, and implants. Efforts to develop male contraceptives have been ongoing for many decades, but progress has been slowed by a lack of funding and industry involvement. As of 2024, most funding for male contraceptive research is derived from government or philanthropic sources.

Novel male contraceptives could work by blocking various steps of the sperm development process, blocking sperm release, or interfering with any of the sperm functions necessary to reach and fertilize an egg in the female reproductive tract. Advantages and disadvantages of each of these approaches will be discussed below, along with relevant examples of products in development.

=== Sperm production ===
These methods work by preventing the testes from producing sperm, or interfering with sperm production in a way that leads to the production of nonfunctional sperm. This approach can be accomplished by either hormonal or nonhormonal small-molecule drugs, or potentially by thermal methods. The effectiveness of contraceptives in this group can be easily assessed microscopically, by measuring sperm count or abnormalities in sperm shape, but because spermatogenesis takes approximately 70 days to complete, these methods are likely to require approximately three months of use before they become effective, and approaches that halt sperm production at an early stage of the process may result in reduced testicular size. Methods have been suggested in the 1980s.

==== Hormonal ====
Hormonal contraceptives for men work similarly to hormonal female methods, using steroids to interrupt the hypothalamic-pituitary-gonadal axis and thereby block sperm production. Administering external androgens and progestogens suppresses secretion of the gonadotropins LH and FSH, which impairs testosterone production and sperm generation in the testes, leading to reduced sperm counts in ejaculates within 4–12 weeks of use. However, since the contraceptives contain testosterone or related androgens, the levels of androgens in the blood remain relatively constant, thereby limiting side effects and maintaining masculine secondary sex characteristics like muscle mass and hair growth.

Multiple methods of male hormonal contraception have been tested in clinical trials since the 1990s, and although one trial was halted early, leading to a large amount of press attention, most hormonal male contraceptives have been found to be effective, reversible, and well-tolerated.

===== Clinical trials =====
As of 2024, the following hormonal male contraceptive products are in clinical trials:

- NES/T (Nesterone/Testosterone gel) is a transdermal gel that users apply to the upper arms and shoulders once daily. Developed as a collaboration between the NICHD and Population Council, NES/T is in a phase II clinical trial, where it is being evaluated for safety and efficacy, with healthy couples relying on it as their only means of birth control.
- DMAU (Dimethandrolone undecanoate) is a steroid-based contraceptive molecule with both androgenic and progestational activities, which allows it to be used as a single agent. DMAU has been tested in clinical trials in both oral and injectable forms.
- 11β-MNTDC is another dual-function molecule (progestogenic androgen) in clinical development as an oral contraceptive for men.

Some anabolic steroids may exhibit suppressive effects on spermatogenesis, but none are being investigated for use as a male contraceptive.

==== Non-hormonal ====
Non-hormonal contraceptives for men are a diverse group of molecules that act by inhibiting any of the many proteins involved in sperm production, release, or function. Because sperm cells are highly specialized, they express many proteins that are rare in the rest of the human body. This suggests the possibility that non-hormonal contraceptives that specifically block these sperm proteins could have fewer side effects than hormonal contraceptives, since sex steroid receptors are found in tissues throughout the body. Non-hormonal contraceptives can work by blocking spermatogenesis, sperm release, or mature sperm function, resulting in products with a wide variety of usage patterns, from slow onset to on-demand usage. Contraceptives targeting mature sperm functions could even be taken by both sperm-producing and egg producing people. Challenges of non-hormonal contraceptive development include bioavailability and delivery past the blood-testis barrier.

===== Clinical trials =====
As of 2024, the following non-hormonal male contraceptive product is in clinical trials:

- YCT529, a retinoic acid receptor antagonist, began a Phase 1 clinical trial in 2023 organized by the US startup YourChoice Pharmaceuticals. The clinical test on humans is done by the UK company Quotient Sciences. It was originally planned in 2022 instead of 2023, with an expected marketing date 5 years later.

===== Preclinical development =====
As of 2024, the following non-hormonal male contraceptive products are in preclinical development:

- BRDT inhibitors such as JQ1 have been shown to produce reversible sterility in male mice by blocking chromatin remodeling, and efforts to develop and evaluate new small-molecule inhibitors with improved pharmacokinetic properties are ongoing.
- Several testis-specific kinases have been linked to male infertility in mice and/or humans, and inhibitors of several of these kinases, such as the testis-specific serine kinases and Cyclin-dependent kinase 2 are in medicinal chemistry development.
- The retinoic acid signalling pathway has been known since the late 1950s to be necessary for spermatogenesis in rodents and humans, and various attempts have been made to develop male contraceptives that work by blocking different enzymes in this pathway. As of 2024, efforts are underway to develop inhibitors of ALDH1A2, Retinoic acid receptor alpha, and SMRT.

New male contraceptive methods could be available before 2030, assuming smooth development and clinical trials.

===== Heat =====
Prolonged testicular heating had been shown to reduce sperm counts in 1941, considered as a method of birth control after 1968 and in the 1980s No modern clinical trials have demonstrated the safety, contraceptive effectiveness, or reversibility of this approach. Various devices are in early preclinical stages of development, and as of 2017 some approaches have been used by men through self-experimentation. As of 2015, the mechanism by which heating disrupts spermatogenesis was still not fully understood. There have been theoretical concerns that prolonged heating could increase the risk of testicular cancer since the inborn birth defect of cryptorchidism carries a risk of testicular cancer or that heating could damage sperm DNA, resulting in harm to potential offspring.

=== Block sperm release ===
These approaches work by either physically or chemically preventing the emission of sperm during ejaculation, and are likely to be effective on-demand.

==== Non-hormonal ====
α1-adrenoceptor antagonists and P2X1 antagonists have been shown to inhibit smooth muscle contractions in the vas deferens during ejaculation, and therefore prevent the release of semen and sperm while maintaining the sensation of orgasm. Various molecules in these categories are under consideration as possible on-demand male contraceptives.

- Silodosin and Tamsulosin are α1-adrenoceptor antagonists approved to treat Benign Prostatic Hyperplasia, and their ejaculation-blocking effects have been evaluated in humans. A patent for their use as contraceptives was filed in 2023 and approved in 2024. Other α1-adrenoceptor antagonists such as phenoxybenzamine have shown inhibition of ejaculation as a side effect, and have been investigated as potential male contraceptives, but work on these molecules is not active as of 2024.
- Novel small molecule P2X1 antagonists are also in early screening and development as potential ejaculation blockers as of 2024.

==== Vas-occlusive contraception ====
A diagram of the mechanism of action of vas-occlusive contraceptive methods.

Vas-occlusive contraception is a form of male birth control that blocks sperm transport in the vas deferens, the tubes that carry sperm from the epididymis to the ejaculatory ducts.

It provides a contraceptive effect through physical blockage of the vas deferens, the duct connecting the epididymis to the urethra. While a vasectomy excises, or removes, a piece of each vas deferens and occludes the remaining open ends of the duct, vas-occlusive methods aim to block the duct while leaving it intact. Vas-occlusive methods generally aim to create long-acting reversible options, through a second procedure that removes the blockage. However, full reversibility remains questionable, since animal and human studies have shown sperm abnormalities, incomplete recovery of sperm parameters, and the development of fertility-impairing antibodies against one's own sperm after blockage removal.

===== Clinical trials =====
As of 2024, the following vas-occlusive male contraceptive products are in clinical trials:

- RISUG is an injectable male contraceptive vas-occlusive gel that has been in development in India since the 1970s, and has shown high effectiveness at pregnancy prevention in multiple clinical trials through Phase III in India, though the results of the largest phase III study were published in a questionably peer-reviewed predatory journal. RISUG is proposed to be reversed through a second injection that dissolves the polymer, but as of 2024, reversibility and return to fertility after removal of RISUG have not been shown in humans. As of 2022, RISUG was awaiting approval from the Drug Controller General of India for mass production.
- ADAM is a hydrogel-based male contraceptive implant in early clinical development by Contraline, Inc. The implant is administered to a user in a procedure similar to a no-scalpel vasectomy, and is proposed to provide protection from pregnancy for approximately two years, after which the hydrogel degrades, thereby restoring fertility.

===== Preclinical development =====
As of 2024, the following vas-occlusive male contraceptive products are in preclinical development:

- Plan A, formerly known as Vasalgel, is an adaptation of the polymer used in RISUG, which as of 2024 is in preclinical development in the United States by NEXT life sciences.
- Other methods for vas occlusion have been proposed, though these methods are largely in very early development.

==== Barrier methods ====
Research into new, more acceptable designs of condoms is ongoing.

=== Block functions of mature sperm ===
These approaches work by blocking functions that mature sperm need in order to reach and fertilize an egg in the female reproductive tract, such as motility, capacitation, semen liquification, or fertilization. Drugs or devices that target mature sperm are likely to be effective on-demand (taken just before intercourse), and could even be delivered either in sperm-producing or egg-producing bodies, leading to unisex contraceptives.

==== Preclinical development ====
As of 2024, the following non-hormonal male contraceptive approaches are in preclinical or early development:

- Short-term inhibition of soluble adenylyl cyclase has been demonstrated to temporarily impair sperm motility and capacitation, and thereby block fertility in mice. Medicinal chemistry efforts are underway to develop molecules that could be used as on-demand contraceptives.
- EP055 is a non-hormonal contraceptive molecule in development that works by targeting the sperm protein Eppin and blocking the initiation of sperm motility after ejaculation.
- Inhibitors of various sperm ion channels/transporters such as CatSper, sNHE, Slo3, and NKAα4, are in development. These inhibitors generally act to block sperm motility and/or capacitation, and have the potential to be administered either systemically in males or through vaginal delivery in females.
- Blocking prostate-derived serine proteases, such as PSA, is under consideration as a way to prevent semen liquifaction and therefore trap sperm in the ejaculate and prevent it from crossing through the cervix towards the egg.
- Sperm-specific metabolic enzymes needed to power motility, such as Lactate Dehydrogenase C, GAPDHS, are also being evaluated as inhibition targets for developing male contraceptives.

== Acceptability ==
Although some people question whether men would be interested in managing their own contraceptives or whether women would trust their male partners to do so successfully, studies consistently show that men around the world have significant levels of interest in novel forms of male contraception and that women in committed relationships would generally trust their male partners to manage the contraceptive burden in the relationship. Additionally, males participating in various contraceptive clinical trials have reported high satisfaction with the products they were using.

=== Among men ===
Studies on potential uptake indicate that in most countries, more than half of men surveyed would be willing to use a new method of male contraception. Interestingly, some of the highest rates were reported in low-income countries like Nigeria and Bangladesh where 76% of men surveyed indicated that they would be willing to use a new method within the first 12 months that it is available. This is particularly compelling, since it has been estimated that a mere 10% uptake of new male contraceptive methods could avert nearly 40% of unintended pregnancies in Nigeria. Across the world, many young and middle-aged men especially want the ability to control their own fertility, and are not well-served by existing family planning programs.

Although a phase II trial for an injectable male contraceptive was halted in 2011 by an independent data safety monitoring board due likely to rare adverse effects experienced by some participants, leading many popular articles to suggest men could not tolerate side effects similar to those that many women endure on hormonal birth control, in reality more than 80% of the study's male participants stated at the end of the trial that they were satisfied with the contraceptive injection, and would be willing to use the method if it were available. Subsequent hormonal male contraceptive clinical trials have progressed successfully, showing high levels of efficacy and acceptability among the participants.

=== Among women ===
It is sometimes assumed that women won't trust men to take contraceptives, since women would bear the consequences of a male partner's missed dose or misuse. Of course, male contraceptive options would not have to replace female contraceptives, and in casual sexual encounters both partners may prefer to independently control their own contraceptive methods. On the other hand, some long-term couples might want only one partner to bear the contraceptive burden. Indeed, there is evidence that a large proportion of women in relationships in many countries around the world would trust their partners to take a potential male method, and many women want more male partner involvement in their own reproductive health services. Further, current contraceptive use data show that more than a quarter of women worldwide already rely on male-controlled methods for contraception (such as condoms and vasectomy), and this figure could grow as more male contraceptive methods become available.

== Potential benefits ==
=== On unintended pregnancy rates ===
Despite the fact that modern female pharmaceutical contraception has been on the market since the 1960s, 40-50% of pregnancies are still unintended worldwide, leading to an approximate total of 121 million unintended pregnancies annually. Importantly, most studies on unintended pregnancies only measure women's intentions about the pregnancy, and so pregnancies that were unintended by men are understudied and may be under-reported. Unintended pregnancies have been shown to be linked with a wide variety of negative outcomes on mental and physical health, as well as educational and socioeconomic attainment in both parents and the children born of unintended pregnancies.

Surprisingly, although the rate of unintended pregnancies (per 1000 women of childbearing age) is higher in developing countries, the percentage of pregnancies that are unintended is actually higher in developed countries, since a lower proportion of women in developed countries are intending to conceive at any given time. Research indicates that unmet need for modern contraception is the cause of 84% of unintended pregnancies in developing countries. In the United States, which has a higher unintended pregnancy rate than many other developed nations, one important reason that women cite for nonuse of contraceptives is concerns about the side effects of existing products. Taken together, these statistics suggests that the current suite of contraceptives is insufficient to meet the fertility planning needs of people across the world, and therefore the introduction of new male contraceptives is likely to decrease the stubbornly high global rates of unintended pregnancy.

International market research indicates that 49% of men in the United States and 76% of men in Nigeria would try a novel male contraceptive within the first year of its existence. Independent modelling predicts that even if real-world usage is only 10% as high as the market research suggests, the introduction of a male contraceptive would avert roughly 200,000 unintended pregnancies per year in the USA and Nigeria each.

=== For men ===
Fathers with unintended births report lower proportions of happiness than in fathers with intentional births and unintended fatherhood for men in their early 30s is associated with a significant increase in depressive symptoms. In addition, men in insecure financial situations are more likely to report a recent unintended pregnancy, and supporting and raising a child brings significant costs that can exacerbate financial insecurity. More broadly, access to effective and reliable contraception would advance men's ability to "maintain personal bodily autonomy, have children, not have children, and parent the children we have in safe and sustainable communities" in accordance with the principles of Reproductive Justice.

=== For women and gender equity ===
Family planning has been found to be associated with overall well-being and is one of the most efficient tools for women's empowerment. Positive outcomes of effective birth control include improvements in women's health, self-agency, education, labor force participation, financial stability, as well as decreases in pregnancy-related deaths, and these positive social and health impacts may be further realized by the addition of novel male and unisex methods. New male contraceptive options would not come at the expense of women's reproductive autonomy, since women would still be able to take advantage of all of the contraceptive methods available to them, choose to have both partners use their own contraceptive methods at the same time, or rely solely on their male partners' form of contraception.

Interventions encouraging male engagement in couples' reproductive health and decisionmaking have shown positive outcomes related to promoting more equitable gender norms in the context of family planning, and increased joint decision making in couples. It is reasonable to assume from these data that increasing male involvement as contraceptive users will further improve gender equity.

=== For transgender, nonbinary, and intersex people ===
While this article has used the term "male" contraception for clarity, these contraceptives are most accurately described as "sperm-targeting" contraceptives, since they would work effectively in any body that produces sperm, regardless of that person's gender identity or external genitalia. Importantly, contraceptives that block functions of mature sperm could be delivered in a unisex manner, incapacitating sperm before ejaculation in sperm-producing people, or after sperm arrives in the body of egg-producing people.

Transgender, nonbinary, and intersex people are underserved by current contraceptive options. For example, many trans men can become pregnant (both intentionally and unintentionally), but may prefer not to use estrogen- or progestin-containing hormonal birth control (both because of the social classification of these hormones as "female sex hormones" and because of a fear they will interfere with masculinizing hormone therapy, although the American College of Obstetricians and Gynecologists states that these hormonal contraceptives have little effect on masculinization.) Trans women who have not had gender-affirming genital surgery may have similar unmet contraceptive needs as those of cisgender men, since gender-affirming hormonal therapy is not effective contraception. Nonbinary and intersex people may be less likely to use current methods of birth control, since they are popularly categorized by the labels "male" and "female", which may not match an individual's gender identity or may invoke feelings of gender dysphoria. This dynamic may contribute to the higher rates of unintended pregnancies seen in the LGBTQ+ community as compared to heterosexual peers, which could in theory be ameliorated by the introduction of unisex contraceptives.

=== For child welfare ===
Novel male contraceptive options are predicted to reduce the incidence unintended pregnancies, and being the product of an intended rather than unintended pregnancy has been shown to correlate with improved health and wellbeing outcomes in children. Additionally, reduced family size correlates with improved educational outcomes, and children born after the introduction of family planning programs in the USA experienced a reduction in poverty rates, both in childhood and adulthood.

=== For racial and socioeconomic equality ===
Unintended pregnancies rates increase as income decreases, both between countries and between socioeconomic and racial groups within a given country. Women of color, especially Black women, in the United States and other developed countries have dramatically higher rates of death during and after birth and worse maternal health outcomes, due in part to systemic discrimination. Since unintended pregnancies can have negative effects on an individual's physical and mental health, educational attainment, and economic prospects, these higher unintended pregnancy rates likely contribute to the persistent socioeconomic gaps within and between societies. It's therefore possible that the introduction of new male contraceptives would not only mitigate gender inequities, as discussed above, but racial and income inequities as well, by providing more ways for individuals to avoid unintended pregnancies.

=== For national economies ===
In addition to the personal financial savings of avoiding unintended pregnancy mentioned above, on a societal level, contraceptives are a public health intervention with a high return on investment: for every dollar the United States government spends on family planning programs, it saves $7.09, for a total of over $13 billion per year. Unintended pregnancies in the United States are estimated to cause $4.5 billion in direct medical costs. New male contraceptives are likely to prevent some unintended pregnancies and therefore reduce these costs.

=== On abortion rates ===
61% of unintended pregnancies end in abortion, whereas only 20% of all pregnancies end in abortion. Interestingly, unintended pregnancy rates are higher in countries where abortion is illegal than those where abortion is legal, yet the incidence of abortion is similar between these groups of countries. Illegal abortions are more likely to be unsafe, and there are an estimated 25 million unsafe abortions globally each year, leading to 50,000 - 70,000 yearly deaths and 5 million people with long-term health consequences. Importantly, increases in the prevalence and uptake of modern contraceptives have been shown to decrease unintended pregnancy and abortion rates when fertility rates are constant. This suggests that the introduction of new forms of male contraception could prevent a significant number of abortions, save lives, and avoid unnecessary suffering.

== History ==
=== Early history ===
A variety of plant extracts have been used throughout history in attempts to prevent pregnancy, though most were used by women, and the efficacy and safety of these methods is questionable.

Condoms made of animal organs or fabric have been in documented use since at least the 16th century, and various types of penile coverings have been depicted and referenced in materials from cultures around the world as early as 3000 BCE, though it is not always clear that these coverings were used for birth control or protection from sexually transmitted infections. The 1800s saw the development of thick reusable rubber condoms, and thinner disposable latex rubber condoms entered production in the 1920s.

Vasectomy was first performed in humans in the late 1800s, but not initially as a method of voluntary birth control. Instead, it was first used as an attempted treatment (later proved to be ineffective) for enlarged prostates, and within a few years, one-sided vasectomy became popular as a supposed method of sexual rejuvenation in older men. Although this rejuvenation treatment was ineffective pseudoscience and any perceived effects were likely due only to the placebo effect, many prominent men, such as Sigmund Freud and W.B. Yeats, sought out the procedure. In the early 1900s, the use of vasectomy took a darker turn, and it became widely promoted and practiced as a means of eugenic involuntary sterilization. It was not until the 1950s that vasectomy became widely used as a method for voluntary sterilization and family planning. Since then, vasectomy has undergone extensive technical improvements and innovations, such that it is no longer a single procedure, but a family of related procedures.

=== Modern history ===
In the 1990s, and into the early 2000s, major pharmaceutical companies Organon, Wyeth, and Schering were pursuing preclinical and clinical development of various male contraceptive products, but in 2006, all three companies ceased development of these products within a short time of each other, for reasons that have not been publicly released.

In 2013, the Male Contraceptive Initiative was founded with the goal of funding and supporting the development of new male contraceptives.

In 2020, Dr. Polina Lishko was awarded the MacArthur "Genius" Fellowship for her contributions to the understanding of sperm physiology, with the award specifically noting her work on "opening up new avenues in ... the development of male-specific or unisex contraceptives."

==== Past research efforts ====
Many researchers have attempted to develop male contraceptive products over the last hundred years. A selection of these efforts (that are no longer in development as of 2024) are listed below.

- Hormonal
  - Trestolone (MENT) was investigated as a contraceptive implant in the 1990s and early 2000s by the Population Council, but this molecule was never approved for contraceptive use.
  - An injectable male contraceptive consisting of Testosterone undecanoate and Norethisterone enanthate reached Phase II clinical trials in 2008. The injection was administered every 8 weeks, and it effectively and reversibly suppressed sperm production in at least 95% of the participants. However, in 2011 the trial was halted early on the recommendation of a World Health Organization Research Project Review Panel, based on their evaluation of adverse events, specifically noting "mood changes, depression, pain at the injection site, and increased libido". This decision generated significant controversy amongst scientists and in public media.
- Non-Hormonal
  - WIN 18446 is a molecule initially developed by a pharmaceutical company called Sterling Drug that was shown to produce reversible infertility in rats. In the late 1950s, it was tested in male prisoners at the Oregon State Penitentiary, and while it showed effective and reversible suppression of sperm production with limited adverse effects, if men drank alcohol while taking WIN 18446, they experienced a severe Disulfiram-alcohol reaction, including nausea, vomiting, and heart palpitations, and so the molecule was not developed further at that time. However, research on this class of compounds was renewed in 2006 by a team at University of Washington, who uncovered the mechanism of action for the contraceptive effect and the alcohol reaction (inhibition of Aldehyde dehydrogenase (ALDH) enzymes), and are attempting to produce molecules that selectively inhibit the sperm-specific isoform of the enzyme (ALDH1A2).
  - Gossypol, an extract of cotton, has been studied as a male contraceptive pill, and was given to thousands of men in China in the 1970s. It successfully decreased sperm production, leading to infertility without significant adverse effects, but this effect was permanent in a substantial percentage of the users, and so it was not pursued for widespread approval. However, synthetic derivatives of gossypol that work through a similar mechanism of action, but more selectively target the sperm-specific Lactate Dehydrogenase C enzyme, are still in development as potential male contraceptives.
  - Miglustat (Zavesca or NB-DNJ) is a drug approved for treatment of several rare lipid storage disorders. In several genetically related strains of laboratory mice, it provided effective and fully reversible contraception, but later studies of showed no contraceptive effect in rabbits or humans.
  - Various small molecules have been shown to cause infertility in rodents and other species by disrupting the junctions between Sertoli cells and elongating spermatids, leading to premature release of immature, nonfunctional sperm. These fertility-disrupting molecules include derivatives of lonidamine, such as Adjudin and Gamendazole, and indenopyridine derivatives such as RTI-4587-073(l) (also known as CDB-4022). Toxicity, reversibility, and bioavailability challenges limited the development of lonidamide derivatives, though efforts to create more specific delivery vehicles partially ameliorated these problems. A new lonidamide derivative called BHD that showed contraceptive effects in rodents was developed in 2023, but further characterization is needed. Indenopyridine derivatives have not been fully evaluated for effects on fertility and toxicity, and as of 2024, it is unclear if work on these compounds is ongoing.
  - In the 20th century, various small molecules such as α-chlorohydrin and 6-chloro-6-deoxy-glucose were shown to cause infertility in rodents, but these molecules also caused unacceptable systemic toxicity, and were not developed further.
  - Contraceptive immunization with sperm antigens has been found to be partially effective and reversible in male primates.
  - Numerous plant extracts and naturally derived molecules have been preliminarily evaluated for use as male contraceptives or spermicides. While some of these extracts have become the basis of more specific molecular drug development campaigns mentioned earlier in this article, others require more work to clarify the active ingredient, or further research into efficacy, toxicity, and reversibility. These molecules face an additional financial challenge in drug development, since unaltered natural products cannot be patented in the United States and many other countries, which reduces the interest of for-profit pharmaceutical companies in these compounds.
- Vas-Occlusive
  - The following vas-occusive device prototypes were developed in the late 20th and early 21st centuries, but are no longer in development.
    - The intra-vas device (IVD) was a rod-shaped device intended to be inserted into the lumen of the vas deferens via a small incision.
    - The "Shug" was a noninjectable device consisting of 2 silicone plugs with nylon tails to help anchor the plug to the vas deferens, and was inserted via the no-scalpel scrotal puncture method.
    - Injectable medical polyurethane was used as a vas-occlusive contraceptive for several hundred thousand men in China in the 1980s.
