= Styrene maleic anhydride =

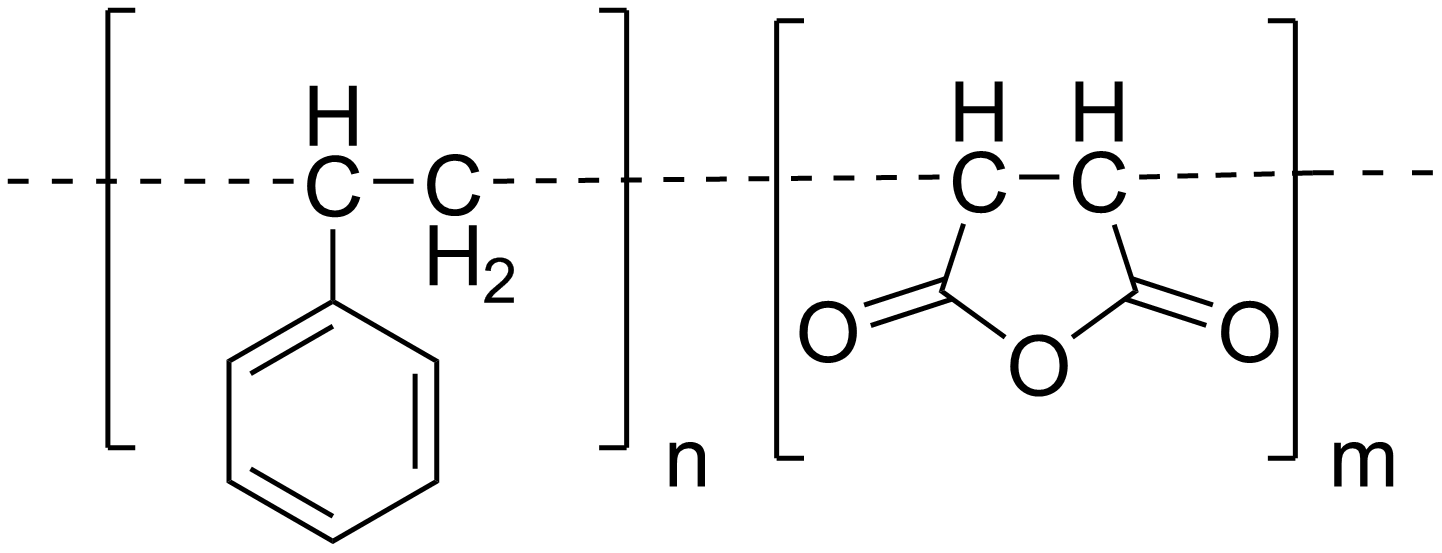
- Styrene Maleic Anhydride

Names
- IUPAC name Poly(Styrene-co-Maleic Anhydride)
- Other names SMA; XIRAN

Identifiers
| CAS Number | 9011-13-6 |
| ECHA InfoCard | 100.211.126 |
| EC Number | 685-536-9 |
| CompTox Dashboard (EPA) | DTXSID50911339 DTXSID201009736, DTXSID50911339 |

Properties
| Chemical formula | (C_{8}H_{8})_{n}-(C_{4}H_{2}O_{3})_{m} |
| Molar mass | Variable |
| Appearance | crystal clear polymer |
| Density | 1.080 g/cm^{3} |
| Solubility | Soluble in alkaline solutions and polar organic solvents |
| Refractive index (n_{D}) | 1.577 |
- Except where otherwise noted, data are given for materials in their standard state (at 25 °C [77 °F], 100 kPa). verify (what is ?) Infobox references

Styrene maleic anhydride (SMA or SMAnh) is a synthetic polymer that is built-up of styrene and maleic anhydride monomers. In one copolymer, the monomers can be almost perfectly alternating. but (random) copolymerisation with less than 50% maleic anhydride content is also possible. The polymer is formed by a radical polymerization, using an organic peroxide as the initiator. The main characteristics of SMA copolymer are its transparent appearance, high heat resistance, high dimensional stability, and the specific reactivity of the anhydride groups. The latter feature results in the solubility of SMA in alkaline (water-based) solutions and dispersion.

SMA is available in a broad range of molecular weights and maleic anhydride (MA) contents. In a typical combination of those two properties, SMA is available as a crystal clear granule that can be used in a wide variety of applications. SMA polymers with a high molecular weight are widely used in engineering plastic applications, normally in the impact modified and optional glass fibre filled variants. Alternatively, SMA is applied using its transparency in combination with other transparent materials like PMMA or the heat resistance to heat-boost other polymers materials like ABS or PVC. The solubility of SMA in alkaline solutions makes it suitable for various applications in the field of sizings (paper), binders, dispersants and coatings. The specific reactivity of SMA makes it a suitable agent for compatibilizing normally incompatible polymers (e.g. ABS/PA blends) or cross-linking.

== SMA producers ==
There are only a few commercial suppliers of SMA polymers. The three major producers are Solenis (Scripset), Aurorium (Xiran), Sartomer (SMA). Nova Chemicals (Dylark) is no longer produced. While the Sartomer product range covers low molecular weight products with high MA contents (and sometimes chemically modified), the Nova materials are high molecular products with low MA content (and mainly impact modified). Aurorium's Xiran product range covers the full spectrum of SMA polymers, including chemically modified types. Each of those products have their own specific features.
