= Lonidamine =

Chemical compound

Clinical data
- ATC code: L01XX07 (WHO)

Identifiers
- IUPAC name: 1-(2,4-dichlorobenzyl)-1H-indazole-3-carboxylic acid
- CAS Number: 50264-69-2
- PubChem CID: 39562
- ChemSpider: 36170
- UNII: U78804BIDR
- KEGG: D07257
- ChEBI: CHEBI:50138
- CompTox Dashboard (EPA): DTXSID5020782
- ECHA InfoCard: 100.051.356

Chemical and physical data
- Formula: C_{15}H_{10}Cl_{2}N_{2}O_{2}
- Molar mass: 321.16 g·mol^{−1}
- 3D model (JSmol): Interactive image
- SMILES: C1=CC=C2C(=C1)C(=NN2CC3=C(C=C(C=C3)Cl)Cl)C(=O)O
- InChI: InChI=1S/C15H10Cl2N2O2/c16-10-6-5-9(12(17)7-10)8-19-13-4-2-1-3-11(13)14(18-19)15(20)21/h1-7H,8H2,(H,20,21); Key:WDRYRZXSPDWGEB-UHFFFAOYSA-N

Lonidamine is a derivative of indazole-3-carboxylic acid, which for a long time, has been known to inhibit aerobic glycolysis in cancer cells. It seems to enhance aerobic glycolysis in normal cells, but suppress glycolysis in cancer cells. This is most likely through the inhibition of the mitochondrially bound hexokinase. Later studies in Ehrlich ascites tumor cells showed that lonidamine inhibits both respiration and glycolysis leading to a decrease in cellular ATP.

Clinical trials of lonidamine in combination with other anticancer agents for a variety of cancers has begun. This is due to its proven ability to inhibit energy metabolism in cancer cells, and to enhance the activity of anticancer agents.

Lonidamine has been used in the treatment of brain tumours in combination with radiotherapy and temozolomide. An in-vitro study showed that a combination of temozolomide and lonidamine at clinically achievable, low plasma concentrations, could inhibit tumour growth, and lonidamine could reduce the dose of temozolomide required for radiosensitization of brain tumours.

A derivative of lonidamine, gamendazole, is in testing as a possible male contraceptive pill.
