= List of human protein-coding genes 8 =

Human protein-coding genes listed in the HGNC database
index	Gene symbol	HGNC and UniProt ID(s)
15751	SPRED1	HGNC:20249; Q7Z699
15752	SPRED2	HGNC:17722; Q7Z698
15753	SPRED3	HGNC:31041; Q2MJR0
15754	SPRING1	HGNC:26128; Q9H741
15755	SPRN	HGNC:16871; Q5BIV9
15756	SPRR1A	HGNC:11259; P35321
15757	SPRR1B	HGNC:11260; P22528
15758	SPRR2A	HGNC:11261; P35326
15759	SPRR2B	HGNC:11262; P35325
15760	SPRR2D	HGNC:11264; P22532
15761	SPRR2E	HGNC:11265; P22531
15762	SPRR2F	HGNC:11266; Q96RM1
15763	SPRR2G	HGNC:11267; Q9BYE4
15764	SPRR3	HGNC:11268; Q9UBC9
15765	SPRR4	HGNC:23173; Q96PI1
15766	SPRR5	HGNC:53428; A0A1B0GTR4
15767	SPRTN	HGNC:25356; Q9H040
15768	SPRY1	HGNC:11269; O43609
15769	SPRY2	HGNC:11270; O43597
15770	SPRY3	HGNC:11271; O43610
15771	SPRY4	HGNC:15533; Q9C004
15772	SPRYD3	HGNC:25920; Q8NCJ5
15773	SPRYD4	HGNC:27468; Q8WW59
15774	SPRYD7	HGNC:14297; Q5W111
15775	SPSB1	HGNC:30628; Q96BD6
15776	SPSB2	HGNC:29522; Q99619
15777	SPSB3	HGNC:30629; Q6PJ21
15778	SPSB4	HGNC:30630; Q96A44
15779	SPTA1	HGNC:11272; P02549
15780	SPTAN1	HGNC:11273; Q13813
15781	SPTB	HGNC:11274; P11277
15782	SPTBN1	HGNC:11275; Q01082
15783	SPTBN2	HGNC:11276; O15020
15784	SPTBN4	HGNC:14896; Q9H254
15785	SPTBN5	HGNC:15680; Q9NRC6
15786	SPTLC1	HGNC:11277; O15269
15787	SPTLC2	HGNC:11278; O15270
15788	SPTLC3	HGNC:16253; Q9NUV7
15789	SPTSSA	HGNC:20361; Q969W0
15790	SPTSSB	HGNC:24045; Q8NFR3
15791	SPTY2D1	HGNC:26818; Q68D10
15792	SPX	HGNC:28139; Q9BT56
15793	SPZ1	HGNC:30721; Q9BXG8
15794	SQLE	HGNC:11279; Q14534
15795	SQOR	HGNC:20390; Q9Y6N5
15796	SQSTM1	HGNC:11280; Q13501
15797	SRA1	HGNC:11281; Q9HD15
15798	SRARP	HGNC:28339; Q8NEQ6
15799	SRBD1	HGNC:25521; Q8N5C6
15800	SRC	HGNC:11283; P12931
15801	SRCAP	HGNC:16974; Q6ZRS2
15802	SRCIN1	HGNC:29506; Q9C0H9
15803	SRD5A1	HGNC:11284; P18405
15804	SRD5A2	HGNC:11285; P31213
15805	SRD5A3	HGNC:25812; Q9H8P0
15806	SREBF1	HGNC:11289; P36956
15807	SREBF2	HGNC:11290; Q12772
15808	SREK1	HGNC:17882; Q8WXA9
15809	SREK1IP1	HGNC:26716; Q8N9Q2
15810	SRF	HGNC:11291; P11831
15811	SRFBP1	HGNC:26333; Q8NEF9
15812	SRGAP1	HGNC:17382; Q7Z6B7
15813	SRGAP2	HGNC:19751; O75044
15814	SRGAP2B	HGNC:35237; P0DMP2
15815	SRGAP2C	HGNC:30584; P0DJJ0
15816	SRGAP3	HGNC:19744; O43295
15817	SRGN	HGNC:9361; P10124
15818	SRI	HGNC:11292; P30626
15819	SRL	HGNC:11295; Q86TD4
15820	SRM	HGNC:11296; P19623
15821	SRMS	HGNC:11298; Q9H3Y6
15822	SRP9	HGNC:11304; P49458
15823	SRP14	HGNC:11299; P37108
15824	SRP19	HGNC:11300; P09132
15825	SRP54	HGNC:11301; P61011
15826	SRP68	HGNC:11302; Q9UHB9
15827	SRP72	HGNC:11303; O76094
15828	SRPK1	HGNC:11305; Q96SB4
15829	SRPK2	HGNC:11306; P78362
15830	SRPK3	HGNC:11402; Q9UPE1
15831	SRPRA	HGNC:11307; P08240
15832	SRPRB	HGNC:24085; Q9Y5M8
15833	SRPX	HGNC:11309; P78539
15834	SRPX2	HGNC:30668; O60687
15835	SRR	HGNC:14398; Q9GZT4
15836	SRRD	HGNC:33910; Q9UH36
15837	SRRM1	HGNC:16638; Q8IYB3
15838	SRRM2	HGNC:16639; Q9UQ35
15839	SRRM3	HGNC:26729; A6NNA2
15840	SRRM4	HGNC:29389; A7MD48
15841	SRRM5	HGNC:37248; B3KS81
15842	SRRT	HGNC:24101; Q9BXP5
15843	SRSF1	HGNC:10780; Q07955
15844	SRSF2	HGNC:10783; Q01130
15845	SRSF3	HGNC:10785; P84103
15846	SRSF4	HGNC:10786; Q08170
15847	SRSF5	HGNC:10787; Q13243
15848	SRSF6	HGNC:10788; Q13247
15849	SRSF7	HGNC:10789; Q16629
15850	SRSF8	HGNC:16988; Q9BRL6
15851	SRSF9	HGNC:10791; Q13242
15852	SRSF10	HGNC:16713; O75494
15853	SRSF11	HGNC:10782; Q05519
15854	SRSF12	HGNC:21220; Q8WXF0
15855	SRXN1	HGNC:16132; Q9BYN0
15856	SRY	HGNC:11311; Q05066
15857	SS18	HGNC:11340; Q15532
15858	SS18L1	HGNC:15592; O75177
15859	SS18L2	HGNC:15593; Q9UHA2
15860	SSB	HGNC:11316; P05455
15861	SSBP1	HGNC:11317; Q04837
15862	SSBP2	HGNC:15831; P81877
15863	SSBP3	HGNC:15674; Q9BWW4
15864	SSBP4	HGNC:15676; Q9BWG4
15865	SSC4D	HGNC:14461; Q8WTU2
15866	SSC5D	HGNC:26641; A1L4H1
15867	SSH1	HGNC:30579; Q8WYL5
15868	SSH2	HGNC:30580; Q76I76
15869	SSH3	HGNC:30581; Q8TE77
15870	SSMEM1	HGNC:29580; Q8WWF3
15871	SSNA1	HGNC:11321; O43805
15872	SSPN	HGNC:11322; Q14714
15873	SSR1	HGNC:11323; P43307
15874	SSR2	HGNC:11324; P43308
15875	SSR3	HGNC:11325; Q9UNL2
15876	SSR4	HGNC:11326; P51571
15877	SSRP1	HGNC:11327; Q08945
15878	SST	HGNC:11329; P61278
15879	SSTR1	HGNC:11330; P30872
15880	SSTR2	HGNC:11331; P30874
15881	SSTR3	HGNC:11332; P32745
15882	SSTR4	HGNC:11333; P31391
15883	SSTR5	HGNC:11334; P35346
15884	SSU72	HGNC:25016; Q9NP77
15885	SSU72L1	HGNC:43626; A0A1W2PQ27
15886	SSU72L2	HGNC:43621; A0A1W2PQD8
15887	SSU72L3	HGNC:43622; A0A1W2PQJ5
15888	SSU72L4	HGNC:43623; A0A1W2PQC6
15889	SSU72L5	HGNC:43624; A0A1W2PQ64
15890	SSU72L6	HGNC:43627; A0A1W2PR75
15891	SSUH2	HGNC:24809; Q9Y2M2
15892	SSX1	HGNC:11335; Q16384
15893	SSX2	HGNC:11336; Q16385
15894	SSX2B	HGNC:22263; Q16385
15895	SSX2IP	HGNC:16509; Q9Y2D8
15896	SSX3	HGNC:11337; Q99909
15897	SSX4	HGNC:11338; O60224
15898	SSX4B	HGNC:16880; O60224
15899	SSX5	HGNC:11339; O60225
15900	SSX7	HGNC:19653; Q7RTT5
15901	ST3GAL1	HGNC:10862; Q11201
15902	ST3GAL2	HGNC:10863; Q16842
15903	ST3GAL3	HGNC:10866; Q11203
15904	ST3GAL4	HGNC:10864; Q11206
15905	ST3GAL5	HGNC:10872; Q9UNP4
15906	ST3GAL6	HGNC:18080; Q9Y274
15907	ST6GAL1	HGNC:10860; P15907
15908	ST6GAL2	HGNC:10861; Q96JF0
15909	ST6GALNAC1	HGNC:23614; Q9NSC7
15910	ST6GALNAC2	HGNC:10867; Q9UJ37
15911	ST6GALNAC3	HGNC:19343; Q8NDV1
15912	ST6GALNAC4	HGNC:17846; Q9H4F1
15913	ST6GALNAC5	HGNC:19342; Q9BVH7
15914	ST6GALNAC6	HGNC:23364; Q969X2
15915	ST7	HGNC:11351; Q9NRC1
15916	ST7L	HGNC:18441; Q8TDW4
15917	ST8SIA1	HGNC:10869; Q92185
15918	ST8SIA2	HGNC:10870; Q92186
15919	ST8SIA3	HGNC:14269; O43173
15920	ST8SIA4	HGNC:10871; Q92187
15921	ST8SIA5	HGNC:17827; O15466
15922	ST8SIA6	HGNC:23317; P61647
15923	ST13	HGNC:11343; P50502
15924	ST14	HGNC:11344; Q9Y5Y6
15925	ST18	HGNC:18695; O60284
15926	STAB1	HGNC:18628; Q9NY15
15927	STAB2	HGNC:18629; Q8WWQ8
15928	STAC	HGNC:11353; Q99469
15929	STAC2	HGNC:23990; Q6ZMT1
15930	STAC3	HGNC:28423; Q96MF2
15931	STAG1	HGNC:11354; Q8WVM7
15932	STAG2	HGNC:11355; Q8N3U4
15933	STAG3	HGNC:11356; Q9UJ98
15934	STAM	HGNC:11357; Q92783
15935	STAM2	HGNC:11358; O75886
15936	STAMBP	HGNC:16950; O95630
15937	STAMBPL1	HGNC:24105; Q96FJ0
15938	STAP1	HGNC:24133; Q9ULZ2
15939	STAP2	HGNC:30430; Q9UGK3
15940	STAR	HGNC:11359; P49675
15941	STARD3	HGNC:17579; Q14849
15942	STARD3NL	HGNC:19169; O95772
15943	STARD4	HGNC:18058; Q96DR4
15944	STARD5	HGNC:18065; Q9NSY2
15945	STARD6	HGNC:18066; P59095
15946	STARD7	HGNC:18063; Q9NQZ5
15947	STARD8	HGNC:19161; Q92502
15948	STARD9	HGNC:19162; Q9P2P6
15949	STARD10	HGNC:10666; Q9Y365
15950	STARD13	HGNC:19164; Q9Y3M8
15951	STAT1	HGNC:11362; P42224
15952	STAT2	HGNC:11363; P52630
15953	STAT3	HGNC:11364; P40763
15954	STAT4	HGNC:11365; Q14765
15955	STAT5A	HGNC:11366; P42229
15956	STAT5B	HGNC:11367; P51692
15957	STAT6	HGNC:11368; P42226
15958	STATH	HGNC:11369; P02808
15959	STAU1	HGNC:11370; O95793
15960	STAU2	HGNC:11371; Q9NUL3
15961	STBD1	HGNC:24854; O95210
15962	STC1	HGNC:11373; P52823
15963	STC2	HGNC:11374; O76061
15964	STEAP1	HGNC:11378; Q9UHE8
15965	STEAP1B	HGNC:41907; Q6NZ63
15966	STEAP2	HGNC:17885; Q8NFT2
15967	STEAP3	HGNC:24592; Q658P3
15968	STEAP4	HGNC:21923; Q687X5
15969	STEEP1	HGNC:26239; Q9H5V9
15970	STH	HGNC:18839; Q8IWL8
15971	STIL	HGNC:10879; Q15468
15972	STIM1	HGNC:11386; Q13586
15973	STIM2	HGNC:19205; Q9P246
15974	STIMATE	HGNC:30526; Q86TL2
15975	STING1	HGNC:27962; Q86WV6
15976	STIP1	HGNC:11387; P31948
15977	STK3	HGNC:11406; Q13188
15978	STK4	HGNC:11408; Q13043
15979	STK10	HGNC:11388; O94804
15980	STK11	HGNC:11389; Q15831
15981	STK11IP	HGNC:19184; Q8N1F8
15982	STK16	HGNC:11394; O75716
15983	STK17A	HGNC:11395; Q9UEE5
15984	STK17B	HGNC:11396; O94768
15985	STK24	HGNC:11403; Q9Y6E0
15986	STK25	HGNC:11404; O00506
15987	STK26	HGNC:18174; Q9P289
15988	STK31	HGNC:11407; Q9BXU1
15989	STK32A	HGNC:28317; Q8WU08
15990	STK32B	HGNC:14217; Q9NY57
15991	STK32C	HGNC:21332; Q86UX6
15992	STK33	HGNC:14568; Q9BYT3
15993	STK35	HGNC:16254; Q8TDR2
15994	STK36	HGNC:17209; Q9NRP7
15995	STK38	HGNC:17847; Q15208
15996	STK38L	HGNC:17848; Q9Y2H1
15997	STK39	HGNC:17717; Q9UEW8
15998	STK40	HGNC:21373; Q8N2I9
15999	STKLD1	HGNC:28669; Q8NE28
16000	STMN1	HGNC:6510; P16949
16001	STMN2	HGNC:10577; Q93045
16002	STMN3	HGNC:15926; Q9NZ72
16003	STMN4	HGNC:16078; Q9H169
16004	STMND1	HGNC:44668; H3BQB6
16005	STMP1	HGNC:41909; E0CX11
16006	STN1	HGNC:26200; Q9H668
16007	STOM	HGNC:3383; P27105
16008	STOML1	HGNC:14560; Q9UBI4
16009	STOML2	HGNC:14559; Q9UJZ1
16010	STOML3	HGNC:19420; Q8TAV4
16011	STON1	HGNC:17003; Q9Y6Q2
16012	STON2	HGNC:30652; Q8WXE9
16013	STOX1	HGNC:23508; Q6ZVD7
16014	STOX2	HGNC:25450; Q9P2F5
16015	STPG1	HGNC:28070; Q5TH74
16016	STPG2	HGNC:28712; Q8N412
16017	STPG3	HGNC:37285; Q8N7X2
16018	STPG4	HGNC:26850; Q8N801
16019	STRA6	HGNC:30650; Q9BX79
16020	STRA8	HGNC:30653; Q7Z7C7
16021	STRADA	HGNC:30172; Q7RTN6
16022	STRADB	HGNC:13205; Q9C0K7
16023	STRAP	HGNC:30796; Q9Y3F4
16024	STRBP	HGNC:16462; Q96SI9
16025	STRC	HGNC:16035; Q7RTU9
16026	STRIP1	HGNC:25916; Q5VSL9
16027	STRIP2	HGNC:22209; Q9ULQ0
16028	STRIT1	HGNC:52297; P0DN84
16029	STRN	HGNC:11424; O43815
16030	STRN3	HGNC:15720; Q13033
16031	STRN4	HGNC:15721; Q9NRL3
16032	STS	HGNC:11425; P08842
16033	STT3A	HGNC:6172; P46977
16034	STT3B	HGNC:30611; Q8TCJ2
16035	STUB1	HGNC:11427; Q9UNE7
16036	STUM	HGNC:30491; Q69YW2
16037	STX1A	HGNC:11433; Q16623
16038	STX1B	HGNC:18539; P61266
16039	STX2	HGNC:3403; P32856
16040	STX3	HGNC:11438; Q13277
16041	STX4	HGNC:11439; Q12846
16042	STX5	HGNC:11440; Q13190
16043	STX6	HGNC:11441; O43752
16044	STX7	HGNC:11442; O15400
16045	STX8	HGNC:11443; Q9UNK0
16046	STX10	HGNC:11428; O60499
16047	STX11	HGNC:11429; O75558
16048	STX12	HGNC:11430; Q86Y82
16049	STX16	HGNC:11431; O14662
16050	STX17	HGNC:11432; P56962
16051	STX18	HGNC:15942; Q9P2W9
16052	STX19	HGNC:19300; Q8N4C7
16053	STXBP1	HGNC:11444; P61764
16054	STXBP2	HGNC:11445; Q15833
16055	STXBP3	HGNC:11446; O00186
16056	STXBP4	HGNC:19694; Q6ZWJ1
16057	STXBP5	HGNC:19665; Q5T5C0
16058	STXBP5L	HGNC:30757; Q9Y2K9
16059	STXBP6	HGNC:19666; Q8NFX7
16060	STYK1	HGNC:18889; Q6J9G0
16061	STYX	HGNC:11447; Q8WUJ0
16062	STYXL1	HGNC:18165; Q9Y6J8
16063	STYXL2	HGNC:25034; Q5VZP5
16064	SUB1	HGNC:19985; P53999
16065	SUCLA2	HGNC:11448; Q9P2R7
16066	SUCLG1	HGNC:11449; P53597
16067	SUCLG2	HGNC:11450; Q96I99
16068	SUCNR1	HGNC:4542; Q9BXA5
16069	SUCO	HGNC:1240; Q9UBS9
16070	SUDS3	HGNC:29545; Q9H7L9
16071	SUFU	HGNC:16466; Q9UMX1
16072	SUGCT	HGNC:16001; Q9HAC7
16073	SUGP1	HGNC:18643; Q8IWZ8
16074	SUGP2	HGNC:18641; Q8IX01
16075	SUGT1	HGNC:16987; Q9Y2Z0
16076	SULF1	HGNC:20391; Q8IWU6
16077	SULF2	HGNC:20392; Q8IWU5
16078	SULT1A1	HGNC:11453; P50225
16079	SULT1A2	HGNC:11454; P50226
16080	SULT1A3	HGNC:11455; P0DMM9
16081	SULT1A4	HGNC:30004; P0DMN0
16082	SULT1B1	HGNC:17845; O43704
16083	SULT1C2	HGNC:11456; O00338
16084	SULT1C3	HGNC:33543; Q6IMI6
16085	SULT1C4	HGNC:11457; O75897
16086	SULT1E1	HGNC:11377; P49888
16087	SULT2A1	HGNC:11458; Q06520
16088	SULT2B1	HGNC:11459; O00204
16089	SULT4A1	HGNC:14903; Q9BR01
16090	SULT6B1	HGNC:33433; Q6IMI4
16091	SUMF1	HGNC:20376; Q8NBK3
16092	SUMF2	HGNC:20415; Q8NBJ7
16093	SUMO1	HGNC:12502; P63165
16094	SUMO2	HGNC:11125; P61956
16095	SUMO3	HGNC:11124; P55854
16096	SUMO4	HGNC:21181; Q6EEV6
16097	SUN1	HGNC:18587; O94901
16098	SUN2	HGNC:14210; Q9UH99
16099	SUN3	HGNC:22429; Q8TAQ9
16100	SUN5	HGNC:16252; Q8TC36
16101	SUOX	HGNC:11460; P51687
16102	SUPT3H	HGNC:11466; O75486
16103	SUPT4H1	HGNC:11467; P63272
16104	SUPT5H	HGNC:11469; O00267
16105	SUPT6H	HGNC:11470; Q7KZ85
16106	SUPT7L	HGNC:30632; O94864
16107	SUPT16H	HGNC:11465; Q9Y5B9
16108	SUPT20H	HGNC:20596; Q8NEM7
16109	SUPT20HL1	HGNC:30773; Q3ZLR7
16110	SUPT20HL2	HGNC:31797; P0C7V6
16111	SUPV3L1	HGNC:11471; Q8IYB8
16112	SURF1	HGNC:11474; Q15526
16113	SURF2	HGNC:11475; Q15527
16114	SURF4	HGNC:11476; O15260
16115	SURF6	HGNC:11478; O75683
16116	SUSD1	HGNC:25413; Q6UWL2
16117	SUSD2	HGNC:30667; Q9UGT4
16118	SUSD3	HGNC:28391; Q96L08
16119	SUSD4	HGNC:25470; Q5VX71
16120	SUSD5	HGNC:29061; O60279
16121	SUSD6	HGNC:19956; Q92537
16122	SUV39H1	HGNC:11479; O43463
16123	SUV39H2	HGNC:17287; Q9H5I1
16124	SUZ12	HGNC:17101; Q15022
16125	SV2A	HGNC:20566; Q7L0J3
16126	SV2B	HGNC:16874; Q7L1I2
16127	SV2C	HGNC:30670; Q496J9
16128	SVBP	HGNC:29204; Q8N300
16129	SVEP1	HGNC:15985; Q4LDE5
16130	SVIL	HGNC:11480; O95425
16131	SVIP	HGNC:25238; Q8NHG7
16132	SVOP	HGNC:25417; Q8N4V2
16133	SVOPL	HGNC:27034; Q8N434
16134	SWAP70	HGNC:17070; Q9UH65
16135	SWI5	HGNC:31412; Q1ZZU3
16136	SWSAP1	HGNC:26638; Q6NVH7
16137	SWT1	HGNC:16785; Q5T5J6
16138	SYAP1	HGNC:16273; Q96A49
16139	SYBU	HGNC:26011; Q9NX95
16140	SYCE1	HGNC:28852; Q8N0S2
16141	SYCE1L	HGNC:37236; A8MT33
16142	SYCE2	HGNC:27411; Q6PIF2
16143	SYCE3	HGNC:35245; A1L190
16144	SYCN	HGNC:18442; Q0VAF6
16145	SYCP1	HGNC:11487; Q15431
16146	SYCP2	HGNC:11490; Q9BX26
16147	SYCP2L	HGNC:21537; Q5T4T6
16148	SYCP3	HGNC:18130; Q8IZU3
16149	SYDE1	HGNC:25824; Q6ZW31
16150	SYDE2	HGNC:25841; Q5VT97
16151	SYF2	HGNC:19824; O95926
16152	SYK	HGNC:11491; P43405
16153	SYMPK	HGNC:22935; Q92797
16154	SYN1	HGNC:11494; P17600
16155	SYN2	HGNC:11495; Q92777
16156	SYN3	HGNC:11496; O14994
16157	SYNC	HGNC:28897; Q9H7C4
16158	SYNCRIP	HGNC:16918; O60506
16159	SYNDIG1	HGNC:15885; Q9H7V2
16160	SYNDIG1L	HGNC:32388; A6NDD5
16161	SYNE1	HGNC:17089; Q8NF91
16162	SYNE2	HGNC:17084; Q8WXH0
16163	SYNE3	HGNC:19861; Q6ZMZ3
16164	SYNE4	HGNC:26703; Q8N205
16165	SYNGAP1	HGNC:11497; Q96PV0
16166	SYNGR1	HGNC:11498; O43759
16167	SYNGR2	HGNC:11499; O43760
16168	SYNGR3	HGNC:11501; O43761
16169	SYNGR4	HGNC:11502; O95473
16170	SYNJ1	HGNC:11503; O43426
16171	SYNJ2	HGNC:11504; O15056
16172	SYNJ2BP	HGNC:18955; P57105
16173	SYNM	HGNC:24466; O15061
16174	SYNPO	HGNC:30672; Q8N3V7
16175	SYNPO2	HGNC:17732; Q9UMS6
16176	SYNPO2L	HGNC:23532; Q9H987
16177	SYNPR	HGNC:16507; Q8TBG9
16178	SYNRG	HGNC:557; Q9UMZ2
16179	SYP	HGNC:11506; P08247
16180	SYPL1	HGNC:11507; Q16563
16181	SYPL2	HGNC:27638; Q5VXT5
16182	SYS1	HGNC:16162; Q8N2H4
16183	SYT1	HGNC:11509; P21579
16184	SYT2	HGNC:11510; Q8N9I0
16185	SYT3	HGNC:11511; Q9BQG1
16186	SYT4	HGNC:11512; Q9H2B2
16187	SYT5	HGNC:11513; O00445
16188	SYT6	HGNC:18638; Q5T7P8
16189	SYT7	HGNC:11514; O43581
16190	SYT8	HGNC:19264; Q8NBV8
16191	SYT9	HGNC:19265; Q86SS6
16192	SYT10	HGNC:19266; Q6XYQ8
16193	SYT11	HGNC:19239; Q9BT88
16194	SYT12	HGNC:18381; Q8IV01
16195	SYT13	HGNC:14962; Q7L8C5
16196	SYT14	HGNC:23143; Q8NB59
16197	SYT15	HGNC:17167; Q9BQS2
16198	SYT15B	HGNC:51487; X6R8R1
16199	SYT16	HGNC:23142; Q17RD7
16200	SYT17	HGNC:24119; Q9BSW7
16201	SYTL1	HGNC:15584; Q8IYJ3
16202	SYTL2	HGNC:15585; Q9HCH5
16203	SYTL3	HGNC:15587; Q4VX76
16204	SYTL4	HGNC:15588; Q96C24
16205	SYTL5	HGNC:15589; Q8TDW5
16206	SYVN1	HGNC:20738; Q86TM6
16207	SZRD1	HGNC:30232; Q7Z422
16208	SZT2	HGNC:29040; Q5T011
16209	TAAR1	HGNC:17734; Q96RJ0
16210	TAAR2	HGNC:4514; Q9P1P5
16211	TAAR5	HGNC:30236; O14804
16212	TAAR6	HGNC:20978; Q96RI8
16213	TAAR8	HGNC:14964; Q969N4
16214	TAAR9	HGNC:20977; Q96RI9
16215	TAB1	HGNC:18157; Q15750
16216	TAB2	HGNC:17075; Q9NYJ8
16217	TAB3	HGNC:30681; Q8N5C8
16218	TAC1	HGNC:11517; P20366
16219	TAC3	HGNC:11521; Q9UHF0
16220	TAC4	HGNC:16641; Q86UU9
16221	TACC1	HGNC:11522; O75410
16222	TACC2	HGNC:11523; O95359
16223	TACC3	HGNC:11524; Q9Y6A5
16224	TACO1	HGNC:24316; Q9BSH4
16225	TACR1	HGNC:11526; P25103
16226	TACR2	HGNC:11527; P21452
16227	TACR3	HGNC:11528; P29371
16228	TACSTD2	HGNC:11530; P09758
16229	TADA1	HGNC:30631; Q96BN2
16230	TADA2A	HGNC:11531; O75478
16231	TADA2B	HGNC:30781; Q86TJ2
16232	TADA3	HGNC:19422; O75528
16233	TAF1	HGNC:11535; P21675
16234	TAF1A	HGNC:11532; Q15573
16235	TAF1B	HGNC:11533; Q53T94
16236	TAF1C	HGNC:11534; Q15572
16237	TAF1D	HGNC:28759; Q9H5J8
16238	TAF1L	HGNC:18056; Q8IZX4
16239	TAF2	HGNC:11536; Q6P1X5
16240	TAF3	HGNC:17303; Q5VWG9
16241	TAF4	HGNC:11537; O00268
16242	TAF4B	HGNC:11538; Q92750
16243	TAF5	HGNC:11539; Q15542
16244	TAF5L	HGNC:17304; O75529
16245	TAF6	HGNC:11540; P49848
16246	TAF6L	HGNC:17305; Q9Y6J9
16247	TAF7	HGNC:11541; Q15545
16248	TAF7L	HGNC:11548; Q5H9L4
16249	TAF8	HGNC:17300; Q7Z7C8
16250	TAF9	HGNC:11542; Q16594
16251	TAF9B	HGNC:17306; Q9HBM6
16252	TAF10	HGNC:11543; Q12962
16253	TAF11	HGNC:11544; Q15544
16254	TAF11L2	HGNC:53845; A6NLC8
16255	TAF11L3	HGNC:53846; A0A1W2PRV1
16256	TAF11L4	HGNC:53847; A0A1W2PPE2
16257	TAF11L5	HGNC:53848; A0A1W2PP81
16258	TAF11L6	HGNC:53849; P0DW11
16259	TAF11L7	HGNC:53850; P0DW12
16260	TAF11L8	HGNC:53851; P0DW13
16261	TAF11L9	HGNC:53852; A0A1W2PR64
16262	TAF11L10	HGNC:53853; P0DW14
16263	TAF11L11	HGNC:53854; A0A1W2PQ09
16264	TAF11L12	HGNC:53855; A0A1W2PPW3
16265	TAF11L13	HGNC:53856; A0A1W2PPH5
16266	TAF11L14	HGNC:53857; A0A1W2PPL8
16267	TAF12	HGNC:11545; Q16514
16268	TAF13	HGNC:11546; Q15543
16269	TAF15	HGNC:11547; Q92804
16270	TAFA1	HGNC:21587; Q7Z5A9
16271	TAFA2	HGNC:21589; Q8N3H0
16272	TAFA3	HGNC:21590; Q7Z5A8
16273	TAFA4	HGNC:21591; Q96LR4
16274	TAFA5	HGNC:21592; Q7Z5A7
16275	TAFAZZIN	HGNC:11577; Q16635
16276	TAGAP	HGNC:15669; Q8N103
16277	TAGLN	HGNC:11553; Q01995
16278	TAGLN2	HGNC:11554; P37802
16279	TAGLN3	HGNC:29868; Q9UI15
16280	TAL1	HGNC:11556; P17542
16281	TAL2	HGNC:11557; Q16559
16282	TALDO1	HGNC:11559; P37837
16283	TAMALIN	HGNC:18707; Q7Z6J2
16284	TAMM41	HGNC:25187; Q96BW9
16285	TANC1	HGNC:29364; Q9C0D5
16286	TANC2	HGNC:30212; Q9HCD6
16287	TANGO2	HGNC:25439; Q6ICL3
16288	TANGO6	HGNC:25749; Q9C0B7
16289	TANK	HGNC:11562; Q92844
16290	TAOK1	HGNC:29259; Q7L7X3
16291	TAOK2	HGNC:16835; Q9UL54
16292	TAOK3	HGNC:18133; Q9H2K8
16293	TAP1	HGNC:43; Q03518
16294	TAP2	HGNC:44; Q03519
16295	TAPBP	HGNC:11566; O15533
16296	TAPBPL	HGNC:30683; Q9BX59
16297	TAPT1	HGNC:26887; Q6NXT6
16298	TARBP1	HGNC:11568; Q13395
16299	TARBP2	HGNC:11569; Q15633
16300	TARDBP	HGNC:11571; Q13148
16301	TARM1	HGNC:37250; B6A8C7
16302	TARS1	HGNC:11572; P26639
16303	TARS2	HGNC:30740; Q9BW92
16304	TARS3	HGNC:24728; A2RTX5
16305	TAS1R1	HGNC:14448; Q7RTX1
16306	TAS1R2	HGNC:14905; Q8TE23
16307	TAS1R3	HGNC:15661; Q7RTX0
16308	TAS2R1	HGNC:14909; Q9NYW7
16309	TAS2R2	HGNC:20615; Q50KZ9
16310	TAS2R3	HGNC:14910; Q9NYW6
16311	TAS2R4	HGNC:14911; Q9NYW5
16312	TAS2R5	HGNC:14912; Q9NYW4
16313	TAS2R7	HGNC:14913; Q9NYW3
16314	TAS2R8	HGNC:14915; Q9NYW2
16315	TAS2R9	HGNC:14917; Q9NYW1
16316	TAS2R10	HGNC:14918; Q9NYW0
16317	TAS2R13	HGNC:14919; Q9NYV9
16318	TAS2R14	HGNC:14920; Q9NYV8
16319	TAS2R16	HGNC:14921; Q9NYV7
16320	TAS2R19	HGNC:19108; P59542
16321	TAS2R20	HGNC:19109; P59543
16322	TAS2R30	HGNC:19112; P59541
16323	TAS2R31	HGNC:19113; P59538
16324	TAS2R33	HGNC:19114; P0DSN6
16325	TAS2R36	HGNC:19115; P0DTE0
16326	TAS2R38	HGNC:9584; P59533
16327	TAS2R39	HGNC:18886; P59534
16328	TAS2R40	HGNC:18885; P59535
16329	TAS2R41	HGNC:18883; P59536
16330	TAS2R42	HGNC:18888; Q7RTR8
16331	TAS2R43	HGNC:18875; P59537
16332	TAS2R46	HGNC:18877; P59540
16333	TAS2R50	HGNC:18882; P59544
16334	TAS2R60	HGNC:20639; P59551
16335	TASL	HGNC:25667; Q9HAI6
16336	TASOR	HGNC:30314; Q9UK61
16337	TASOR2	HGNC:23484; Q5VWN6
16338	TASP1	HGNC:15859; Q9H6P5
16339	TAT	HGNC:11573; P17735
16340	TATDN1	HGNC:24220; Q6P1N9
16341	TATDN2	HGNC:28988; Q93075
16342	TATDN3	HGNC:27010; Q17R31
16343	TAX1BP1	HGNC:11575; Q86VP1
16344	TAX1BP3	HGNC:30684; O14907
16345	TBATA	HGNC:23511; Q96M53
16346	TBC1D1	HGNC:11578; Q86TI0
16347	TBC1D2	HGNC:18026; Q9BYX2
16348	TBC1D2B	HGNC:29183; Q9UPU7
16349	TBC1D3	HGNC:19031; Q8IZP1
16350	TBC1D3B	HGNC:27011; A6NDS4
16351	TBC1D3C	HGNC:24889; Q6IPX1
16352	TBC1D3D	HGNC:28944; A0A087WVF3
16353	TBC1D3E	HGNC:27071; A0A087X179
16354	TBC1D3F	HGNC:18257; A6NER0
16355	TBC1D3G	HGNC:29860; Q6DHY5
16356	TBC1D3H	HGNC:30708; P0C7X1
16357	TBC1D3I	HGNC:32709; A0A087WXS9
16358	TBC1D3K	HGNC:51245; A0A087X1G2
16359	TBC1D3L	HGNC:51246; B9A6J9
16360	TBC1D4	HGNC:19165; O60343
16361	TBC1D5	HGNC:19166; Q92609
16362	TBC1D7	HGNC:21066; Q9P0N9
16363	TBC1D8	HGNC:17791; O95759
16364	TBC1D8B	HGNC:24715; Q0IIM8
16365	TBC1D9	HGNC:21710; Q6ZT07
16366	TBC1D9B	HGNC:29097; Q66K14
16367	TBC1D10A	HGNC:23609; Q9BXI6
16368	TBC1D10B	HGNC:24510; Q4KMP7
16369	TBC1D10C	HGNC:24702; Q8IV04
16370	TBC1D12	HGNC:29082; O60347
16371	TBC1D13	HGNC:25571; Q9NVG8
16372	TBC1D14	HGNC:29246; Q9P2M4
16373	TBC1D15	HGNC:25694; Q8TC07
16374	TBC1D16	HGNC:28356; Q8TBP0
16375	TBC1D17	HGNC:25699; Q9HA65
16376	TBC1D19	HGNC:25624; Q8N5T2
16377	TBC1D20	HGNC:16133; Q96BZ9
16378	TBC1D21	HGNC:28536; Q8IYX1
16379	TBC1D22A	HGNC:1309; Q8WUA7
16380	TBC1D22B	HGNC:21602; Q9NU19
16381	TBC1D23	HGNC:25622; Q9NUY8
16382	TBC1D24	HGNC:29203; Q9ULP9
16383	TBC1D25	HGNC:8092; Q3MII6
16384	TBC1D26	HGNC:28745; Q86UD7
16385	TBC1D28	HGNC:26858; Q2M2D7
16386	TBC1D30	HGNC:29164; Q9Y2I9
16387	TBC1D31	HGNC:30888; Q96DN5
16388	TBC1D32	HGNC:21485; Q96NH3
16389	TBCA	HGNC:11579; O75347
16390	TBCB	HGNC:1989; Q99426
16391	TBCC	HGNC:11580; Q15814
16392	TBCCD1	HGNC:25546; Q9NVR7
16393	TBCD	HGNC:11581; Q9BTW9
16394	TBCE	HGNC:11582; Q15813
16395	TBCEL	HGNC:28115; Q5QJ74
16396	TBCK	HGNC:28261; Q8TEA7
16397	TBK1	HGNC:11584; Q9UHD2
16398	TBKBP1	HGNC:30140; A7MCY6
16399	TBL1X	HGNC:11585; O60907
16400	TBL1XR1	HGNC:29529; Q9BZK7
16401	TBL1Y	HGNC:18502; Q9BQ87
16402	TBL2	HGNC:11586; Q9Y4P3
16403	TBL3	HGNC:11587; Q12788
16404	TBP	HGNC:11588; P20226
16405	TBPL1	HGNC:11589; P62380
16406	TBPL2	HGNC:19841; Q6SJ96
16407	TBR1	HGNC:11590; Q16650
16408	TBRG1	HGNC:29551; Q3YBR2
16409	TBRG4	HGNC:17443; Q969Z0
16410	TBX1	HGNC:11592; O43435
16411	TBX2	HGNC:11597; Q13207
16412	TBX3	HGNC:11602; O15119
16413	TBX4	HGNC:11603; P57082
16414	TBX5	HGNC:11604; Q99593
16415	TBX6	HGNC:11605; O95947
16416	TBX10	HGNC:11593; O75333
16417	TBX15	HGNC:11594; Q96SF7
16418	TBX18	HGNC:11595; O95935
16419	TBX19	HGNC:11596; O60806
16420	TBX20	HGNC:11598; Q9UMR3
16421	TBX21	HGNC:11599; Q9UL17
16422	TBX22	HGNC:11600; Q9Y458
16423	TBXA2R	HGNC:11608; P21731
16424	TBXAS1	HGNC:11609; P24557
16425	TBXT	HGNC:11515; O15178
16426	TC2N	HGNC:19859; Q8N9U0
16427	TCAF1	HGNC:22201; Q9Y4C2
16428	TCAF2	HGNC:26878; A6NFQ2
16429	TCAIM	HGNC:25241; Q8N3R3
16430	TCAP	HGNC:11610; O15273
16431	TCEA1	HGNC:11612; P23193
16432	TCEA2	HGNC:11614; Q15560
16433	TCEA3	HGNC:11615; O75764
16434	TCEAL1	HGNC:11616; Q15170
16435	TCEAL2	HGNC:29818; Q9H3H9
16436	TCEAL3	HGNC:28247; Q969E4
16437	TCEAL4	HGNC:26121; Q96EI5
16438	TCEAL5	HGNC:22282; Q5H9L2
16439	TCEAL6	HGNC:24553; Q6IPX3
16440	TCEAL7	HGNC:28336; Q9BRU2
16441	TCEAL8	HGNC:28683; Q8IYN2
16442	TCEAL9	HGNC:30084; Q9UHQ7
16443	TCEANC	HGNC:28277; Q8N8B7
16444	TCEANC2	HGNC:26494; Q96MN5
16445	TCERG1	HGNC:15630; O14776
16446	TCERG1L	HGNC:23533; Q5VWI1
16447	TCF3	HGNC:11633; P15923
16448	TCF4	HGNC:11634; P15884
16449	TCF7	HGNC:11639; P36402
16450	TCF7L1	HGNC:11640; Q9HCS4
16451	TCF7L2	HGNC:11641; Q9NQB0
16452	TCF12	HGNC:11623; Q99081
16453	TCF15	HGNC:11627; Q12870
16454	TCF19	HGNC:11629; Q9Y242
16455	TCF20	HGNC:11631; Q9UGU0
16456	TCF21	HGNC:11632; O43680
16457	TCF23	HGNC:18602; Q7RTU1
16458	TCF24	HGNC:32275; Q7RTU0
16459	TCF25	HGNC:29181; Q9BQ70
16460	TCFL5	HGNC:11646; Q9UL49
16461	TCHH	HGNC:11791; Q07283
16462	TCHHL1	HGNC:31796; Q5QJ38
16463	TCHP	HGNC:28135; Q9BT92
16464	TCIM	HGNC:1357; Q9NR00
16465	TCIRG1	HGNC:11647; Q13488
16466	TCL1A	HGNC:11648; P56279
16467	TCL1B	HGNC:11649; O95988
16468	TCN1	HGNC:11652; P20061
16469	TCN2	HGNC:11653; P20062
16470	TCOF1	HGNC:11654; Q13428
16471	TCP1	HGNC:11655; P17987
16472	TCP10L	HGNC:11657; Q8TDR4
16473	TCP11	HGNC:11658; Q8WWU5
16474	TCP11L1	HGNC:25655; Q9NUJ3
16475	TCP11L2	HGNC:28627; Q8N4U5
16476	TCP11X1	HGNC:48369; B4DZS4
16477	TCP11X2	HGNC:48335; Q5H9J9
16478	TCTA	HGNC:11692; P57738
16479	TCTN1	HGNC:26113; Q2MV58
16480	TCTN2	HGNC:25774; Q96GX1
16481	TCTN3	HGNC:24519; Q6NUS6
16482	TDG	HGNC:11700; Q13569
16483	TDO2	HGNC:11708; P48775
16484	TDP1	HGNC:18884; Q9NUW8
16485	TDP2	HGNC:17768; O95551
16486	TDRD1	HGNC:11712; Q9BXT4
16487	TDRD3	HGNC:20612; Q9H7E2
16488	TDRD5	HGNC:20614; Q8NAT2
16489	TDRD6	HGNC:21339; O60522
16490	TDRD7	HGNC:30831; Q8NHU6
16491	TDRD9	HGNC:20122; Q8NDG6
16492	TDRD10	HGNC:25316; Q5VZ19
16493	TDRD12	HGNC:25044; Q587J7
16494	TDRD15	HGNC:45037; B5MCY1
16495	TDRKH	HGNC:11713; Q9Y2W6
16496	TDRP	HGNC:26951; Q86YL5
16497	TEAD1	HGNC:11714; P28347
16498	TEAD2	HGNC:11715; Q15562
16499	TEAD3	HGNC:11716; Q99594
16500	TEAD4	HGNC:11717; Q15561
16501	TEC	HGNC:11719; P42680
16502	TECPR1	HGNC:22214; Q7Z6L1
16503	TECPR2	HGNC:19957; O15040
16504	TECR	HGNC:4551; Q9NZ01
16505	TECRL	HGNC:27365; Q5HYJ1
16506	TECTA	HGNC:11720; O75443
16507	TECTB	HGNC:11721; Q96PL2
16508	TEDC1	HGNC:20127; Q86SX3
16509	TEDC2	HGNC:25849; Q7L2K0
16510	TEDDM1	HGNC:30233; Q5T9Z0
16511	TEF	HGNC:11722; Q10587
16512	TEFM	HGNC:26223; Q96QE5
16513	TEK	HGNC:11724; Q02763
16514	TEKT1	HGNC:15534; Q969V4
16515	TEKT2	HGNC:11725; Q9UIF3
16516	TEKT3	HGNC:14293; Q9BXF9
16517	TEKT4	HGNC:31012; Q8WW24
16518	TEKT5	HGNC:26554; Q96M29
16519	TEKTIP1	HGNC:34496; A6NCJ1
16520	TEKTL1	HGNC:26866; Q8IYK2
16521	TELO2	HGNC:29099; Q9Y4R8
16522	TEN1	HGNC:37242; Q86WV5
16523	TENM1	HGNC:8117; Q9UKZ4
16524	TENM2	HGNC:29943; Q9NT68
16525	TENM3	HGNC:29944; Q9P273
16526	TENM4	HGNC:29945; Q6N022
16527	TENT2	HGNC:26776; Q6PIY7
16528	TENT4A	HGNC:16705; Q5XG87
16529	TENT4B	HGNC:30758; Q8NDF8
16530	TENT5A	HGNC:18345; Q96IP4
16531	TENT5B	HGNC:28273; Q96A09
16532	TENT5C	HGNC:24712; Q5VWP2
16533	TENT5D	HGNC:28399; Q8NEK8
16534	TEP1	HGNC:11726; Q99973
16535	TEPSIN	HGNC:26458; Q96N21
16536	TERB1	HGNC:26675; Q8NA31
16537	TERB2	HGNC:28520; Q8NHR7
16538	TERF1	HGNC:11728; P54274
16539	TERF2	HGNC:11729; Q15554
16540	TERF2IP	HGNC:19246; Q9NYB0
16541	TERT	HGNC:11730; O14746
16542	TES	HGNC:14620; Q9UGI8
16543	TESC	HGNC:26065; Q96BS2
16544	TESK1	HGNC:11731; Q15569
16545	TESK2	HGNC:11732; Q96S53
16546	TESMIN	HGNC:7446; Q9Y4I5
16547	TESPA1	HGNC:29109; A2RU30
16548	TET1	HGNC:29484; Q8NFU7
16549	TET2	HGNC:25941; Q6N021
16550	TET3	HGNC:28313; O43151
16551	TEX2	HGNC:30884; Q8IWB9
16552	TEX9	HGNC:29585; Q8N6V9
16553	TEX10	HGNC:25988; Q9NXF1
16554	TEX11	HGNC:11733; Q8IYF3
16555	TEX12	HGNC:11734; Q9BXU0
16556	TEX13A	HGNC:11735; Q9BXU3
16557	TEX13B	HGNC:11736; Q9BXU2
16558	TEX13C	HGNC:52277; A0A0J9YWL9
16559	TEX13D	HGNC:52278; A0A0J9YY54
16560	TEX14	HGNC:11737; Q8IWB6
16561	TEX15	HGNC:11738; Q9BXT5
16562	TEX19	HGNC:33802; Q8NA77
16563	TEX22	HGNC:40026; C9J3V5
16564	TEX26	HGNC:28622; Q8N6G2
16565	TEX28	HGNC:2563; O15482
16566	TEX29	HGNC:20370; Q8N6K0
16567	TEX30	HGNC:25188; Q5JUR7
16568	TEX35	HGNC:25366; Q5T0J7
16569	TEX36	HGNC:31653; Q5VZQ5
16570	TEX38	HGNC:29589; Q6PEX7
16571	TEX44	HGNC:28563; Q53QW1
16572	TEX46	HGNC:44651; H3BTG2
16573	TEX47	HGNC:22402; Q8TBZ9
16574	TEX48	HGNC:52393; A0A1B0GUV7
16575	TEX50	HGNC:52382; A0A1B0GTY4
16576	TEX51	HGNC:52387; A0A1B0GUA7
16577	TEX52	HGNC:53643; A6NCN8
16578	TEX53	HGNC:53655; A0A1B0GU33
16579	TEX54	HGNC:53729; A0A1B0GVG6
16580	TEX55	HGNC:26553; Q96M34
16581	TEX101	HGNC:30722; Q9BY14
16582	TEX261	HGNC:30712; Q6UWH6
16583	TEX264	HGNC:30247; Q9Y6I9
16584	TF	HGNC:11740; P02787
16585	TFAM	HGNC:11741; Q00059
16586	TFAP2A	HGNC:11742; P05549
16587	TFAP2B	HGNC:11743; Q92481
16588	TFAP2C	HGNC:11744; Q92754
16589	TFAP2D	HGNC:15581; Q7Z6R9
16590	TFAP2E	HGNC:30774; Q6VUC0
16591	TFAP4	HGNC:11745; Q01664
16592	TFB1M	HGNC:17037; Q8WVM0
16593	TFB2M	HGNC:18559; Q9H5Q4
16594	TFCP2	HGNC:11748; Q12800
16595	TFCP2L1	HGNC:17925; Q9NZI6
16596	TFDP1	HGNC:11749; Q14186
16597	TFDP2	HGNC:11751; Q14188
16598	TFDP3	HGNC:24603; Q5H9I0
16599	TFE3	HGNC:11752; P19532
16600	TFEB	HGNC:11753; P19484
16601	TFEC	HGNC:11754; O14948
16602	TFF1	HGNC:11755; P04155
16603	TFF2	HGNC:11756; Q03403
16604	TFF3	HGNC:11757; Q07654
16605	TFG	HGNC:11758; Q92734
16606	TFIP11	HGNC:17165; Q9UBB9
16607	TFPI	HGNC:11760; P10646
16608	TFPI2	HGNC:11761; P48307
16609	TFPT	HGNC:13630; P0C1Z6
16610	TFR2	HGNC:11762; Q9UP52
16611	TFRC	HGNC:11763; P02786
16612	TG	HGNC:11764; P01266
16613	TGDS	HGNC:20324; O95455
16614	TGFA	HGNC:11765; P01135
16615	TGFB1	HGNC:11766; P01137
16616	TGFB1I1	HGNC:11767; O43294
16617	TGFB2	HGNC:11768; P61812
16618	TGFB3	HGNC:11769; P10600
16619	TGFBI	HGNC:11771; Q15582
16620	TGFBR1	HGNC:11772; P36897
16621	TGFBR2	HGNC:11773; P37173
16622	TGFBR3	HGNC:11774; Q03167
16623	TGFBR3L	HGNC:44152; H3BV60
16624	TGFBRAP1	HGNC:16836; Q8WUH2
16625	TGIF1	HGNC:11776; Q15583
16626	TGIF2	HGNC:15764; Q9GZN2
16627	TGIF2LX	HGNC:18570; Q8IUE1
16628	TGIF2LY	HGNC:18569; Q8IUE0
16629	TGM1	HGNC:11777; P22735
16630	TGM2	HGNC:11778; P21980
16631	TGM3	HGNC:11779; Q08188
16632	TGM4	HGNC:11780; P49221
16633	TGM5	HGNC:11781; O43548
16634	TGM6	HGNC:16255; O95932
16635	TGM7	HGNC:30790; Q96PF1
16636	TGOLN2	HGNC:15450; O43493
16637	TGS1	HGNC:17843; Q96RS0
16638	TH	HGNC:11782; P07101
16639	THADA	HGNC:19217; Q6YHU6
16640	THAP1	HGNC:20856; Q9NVV9
16641	THAP2	HGNC:20854; Q9H0W7
16642	THAP3	HGNC:20855; Q8WTV1
16643	THAP4	HGNC:23187; Q8WY91
16644	THAP5	HGNC:23188; Q7Z6K1
16645	THAP6	HGNC:23189; Q8TBB0
16646	THAP7	HGNC:23190; Q9BT49
16647	THAP8	HGNC:23191; Q8NA92
16648	THAP9	HGNC:23192; Q9H5L6
16649	THAP10	HGNC:23193; Q9P2Z0
16650	THAP11	HGNC:23194; Q96EK4
16651	THAP12	HGNC:9440; O43422
16652	THBD	HGNC:11784; P07204
16653	THBS1	HGNC:11785; P07996
16654	THBS2	HGNC:11786; P35442
16655	THBS3	HGNC:11787; P49746
16656	THBS4	HGNC:11788; P35443
16657	THEM4	HGNC:17947; Q5T1C6
16658	THEM5	HGNC:26755; Q8N1Q8
16659	THEM6	HGNC:29656; Q8WUY1
16660	THEMIS	HGNC:21569; Q8N1K5
16661	THEMIS2	HGNC:16839; Q5TEJ8
16662	THG1L	HGNC:26053; Q9NWX6
16663	THNSL1	HGNC:26160; Q8IYQ7
16664	THNSL2	HGNC:25602; Q86YJ6
16665	THOC1	HGNC:19070; Q96FV9
16666	THOC2	HGNC:19073; Q8NI27
16667	THOC3	HGNC:19072; Q96J01
16668	THOC5	HGNC:19074; Q13769
16669	THOC6	HGNC:28369; Q86W42
16670	THOC7	HGNC:29874; Q6I9Y2
16671	THOP1	HGNC:11793; P52888
16672	THPO	HGNC:11795; P40225
16673	THRA	HGNC:11796; P10827
16674	THRAP3	HGNC:22964; Q9Y2W1
16675	THRB	HGNC:11799; P10828
16676	THRSP	HGNC:11800; Q92748
16677	THSD1	HGNC:17754; Q9NS62
16678	THSD4	HGNC:25835; Q6ZMP0
16679	THSD7A	HGNC:22207; Q9UPZ6
16680	THSD7B	HGNC:29348; Q9C0I4
16681	THSD8	HGNC:53785; A0A1W2PP97
16682	THTPA	HGNC:18987; Q9BU02
16683	THUMPD1	HGNC:23807; Q9NXG2
16684	THUMPD2	HGNC:14890; Q9BTF0
16685	THUMPD3	HGNC:24493; Q9BV44
16686	THY1	HGNC:11801; P04216
16687	THYN1	HGNC:29560; Q9P016
16688	TIA1	HGNC:11802; P31483
16689	TIAL1	HGNC:11804; Q01085
16690	TIAM1	HGNC:11805; Q13009
16691	TIAM2	HGNC:11806; Q8IVF5
16692	TICAM1	HGNC:18348; Q8IUC6
16693	TICAM2	HGNC:21354; Q86XR7
16694	TICRR	HGNC:28704; Q7Z2Z1
16695	TIE1	HGNC:11809; P35590
16696	TIFA	HGNC:19075; Q96CG3
16697	TIFAB	HGNC:34024; Q6ZNK6
16698	TIGAR	HGNC:1185; Q9NQ88
16699	TIGD1	HGNC:14523; Q96MW7
16700	TIGD2	HGNC:18333; Q4W5G0
16701	TIGD3	HGNC:18334; Q6B0B8
16702	TIGD4	HGNC:18335; Q8IY51
16703	TIGD5	HGNC:18336; Q53EQ6
16704	TIGD6	HGNC:18332; Q17RP2
16705	TIGD7	HGNC:18331; Q6NT04
16706	TIGIT	HGNC:26838; Q495A1
16707	TIMD4	HGNC:25132; Q96H15
16708	TIMELESS	HGNC:11813; Q9UNS1
16709	TIMM8A	HGNC:11817; O60220
16710	TIMM8B	HGNC:11818; Q9Y5J9
16711	TIMM9	HGNC:11819; Q9Y5J7
16712	TIMM10	HGNC:11814; P62072
16713	TIMM10B	HGNC:4022; Q9Y5J6
16714	TIMM13	HGNC:11816; Q9Y5L4
16715	TIMM17A	HGNC:17315; Q99595
16716	TIMM17B	HGNC:17310; O60830
16717	TIMM21	HGNC:25010; Q9BVV7
16718	TIMM22	HGNC:17317; Q9Y584
16719	TIMM23	HGNC:17312; O14925
16720	TIMM23B	HGNC:23581; Q5SRD1
16721	TIMM29	HGNC:25152; Q9BSF4
16722	TIMM44	HGNC:17316; O43615
16723	TIMM50	HGNC:23656; Q3ZCQ8
16724	TIMMDC1	HGNC:1321; Q9NPL8
16725	TIMP1	HGNC:11820; P01033
16726	TIMP2	HGNC:11821; P16035
16727	TIMP3	HGNC:11822; P35625
16728	TIMP4	HGNC:11823; Q99727
16729	TINAG	HGNC:14599; Q9UJW2
16730	TINAGL1	HGNC:19168; Q9GZM7
16731	TINCR	HGNC:14607; A0A2R8Y7D0
16732	TINF2	HGNC:11824; Q9BSI4
16733	TIPARP	HGNC:23696; Q7Z3E1
16734	TIPIN	HGNC:30750; Q9BVW5
16735	TIPRL	HGNC:30231; O75663
16736	TIRAP	HGNC:17192; P58753
16737	TJAP1	HGNC:17949; Q5JTD0
16738	TJP1	HGNC:11827; Q07157
16739	TJP2	HGNC:11828; Q9UDY2
16740	TJP3	HGNC:11829; O95049
16741	TK1	HGNC:11830; P04183
16742	TK2	HGNC:11831; O00142
16743	TKFC	HGNC:24552; Q3LXA3
16744	TKT	HGNC:11834; P29401
16745	TKTL1	HGNC:11835; P51854
16746	TKTL2	HGNC:25313; Q9H0I9
16747	TLCD1	HGNC:25177; Q96CP7
16748	TLCD2	HGNC:33522; A6NGC4
16749	TLCD3A	HGNC:29646; Q8TBR7
16750	TLCD3B	HGNC:25295; Q71RH2
16751	TLCD4	HGNC:26477; Q96MV1
16752	TLCD5	HGNC:28280; Q6ZRR5
16753	TLDC2	HGNC:16112; A0PJX2
16754	TLE1	HGNC:11837; Q04724
16755	TLE2	HGNC:11838; Q04725
16756	TLE3	HGNC:11839; Q04726
16757	TLE4	HGNC:11840; Q04727
16758	TLE5	HGNC:307; Q08117
16759	TLE6	HGNC:30788; Q9H808
16760	TLE7	HGNC:53648; A0A1W2PR48
16761	TLK1	HGNC:11841; Q9UKI8
16762	TLK2	HGNC:11842; Q86UE8
16763	TLL1	HGNC:11843; O43897
16764	TLL2	HGNC:11844; Q9Y6L7
16765	TLN1	HGNC:11845; Q9Y490
16766	TLN2	HGNC:15447; Q9Y4G6
16767	TLNRD1	HGNC:13519; Q9H1K6
16768	TLR1	HGNC:11847; Q15399
16769	TLR2	HGNC:11848; O60603
16770	TLR3	HGNC:11849; O15455
16771	TLR4	HGNC:11850; O00206
16772	TLR5	HGNC:11851; O60602
16773	TLR6	HGNC:16711; Q9Y2C9
16774	TLR7	HGNC:15631; Q9NYK1
16775	TLR8	HGNC:15632; Q9NR97
16776	TLR9	HGNC:15633; Q9NR96
16777	TLR10	HGNC:15634; Q9BXR5
16778	TLX1	HGNC:5056; P31314
16779	TLX2	HGNC:5057; O43763
16780	TLX3	HGNC:13532; O43711
16781	TM2D1	HGNC:24142; Q9BX74
16782	TM2D2	HGNC:24127; Q9BX73
16783	TM2D3	HGNC:24128; Q9BRN9
16784	TM4SF1	HGNC:11853; P30408
16785	TM4SF4	HGNC:11856; P48230
16786	TM4SF5	HGNC:11857; O14894
16787	TM4SF18	HGNC:25181; Q96CE8
16788	TM4SF19	HGNC:25167; Q96DZ7
16789	TM4SF20	HGNC:26230; Q53R12
16790	TM6SF1	HGNC:11860; Q9BZW5
16791	TM6SF2	HGNC:11861; Q9BZW4
16792	TM7SF2	HGNC:11863; O76062
16793	TM7SF3	HGNC:23049; Q9NS93
16794	TM9SF1	HGNC:11864; O15321
16795	TM9SF2	HGNC:11865; Q99805
16796	TM9SF3	HGNC:21529; Q9HD45
16797	TM9SF4	HGNC:30797; Q92544
16798	TMA7	HGNC:26932; Q9Y2S6
16799	TMA7B	HGNC:53893; A0A024R1R8
16800	TMA16	HGNC:25638; Q96EY4
16801	TMBIM1	HGNC:23410; Q969X1
16802	TMBIM4	HGNC:24257; Q9HC24
16803	TMBIM6	HGNC:11723; P55061
16804	TMC1	HGNC:16513; Q8TDI8
16805	TMC2	HGNC:16527; Q8TDI7
16806	TMC3	HGNC:22995; Q7Z5M5
16807	TMC4	HGNC:22998; Q7Z404
16808	TMC5	HGNC:22999; Q6UXY8
16809	TMC6	HGNC:18021; Q7Z403
16810	TMC7	HGNC:23000; Q7Z402
16811	TMC8	HGNC:20474; Q8IU68
16812	TMCC1	HGNC:29116; O94876
16813	TMCC2	HGNC:24239; O75069
16814	TMCC3	HGNC:29199; Q9ULS5
16815	TMCO1	HGNC:18188; Q9UM00
16816	TMCO2	HGNC:23312; Q7Z6W1
16817	TMCO4	HGNC:27393; Q5TGY1
16818	TMCO5A	HGNC:28558; Q8N6Q1
16819	TMCO6	HGNC:28814; Q96DC7
16820	TMDD1	HGNC:53646; P0DPE3
16821	TMED1	HGNC:17291; Q13445
16822	TMED2	HGNC:16996; Q15363
16823	TMED3	HGNC:28889; Q9Y3Q3
16824	TMED4	HGNC:22301; Q7Z7H5
16825	TMED5	HGNC:24251; Q9Y3A6
16826	TMED6	HGNC:28331; Q8WW62
16827	TMED7	HGNC:24253; Q9Y3B3
16828	TMED8	HGNC:18633; Q6PL24
16829	TMED9	HGNC:24878; Q9BVK6
16830	TMED10	HGNC:16998; P49755
16831	TMEFF1	HGNC:11866; Q8IYR6
16832	TMEFF2	HGNC:11867; Q9UIK5
16833	TMEM8B	HGNC:21427; A6NDV4
16834	TMEM9	HGNC:18823; Q9P0T7
16835	TMEM9B	HGNC:1168; Q9NQ34
16836	TMEM11	HGNC:16823; P17152
16837	TMEM14A	HGNC:21076; Q9Y6G1
16838	TMEM14B	HGNC:21384; Q9NUH8
16839	TMEM14C	HGNC:20952; Q9P0S9
16840	TMEM17	HGNC:26623; Q86X19
16841	TMEM18	HGNC:25257; Q96B42
16842	TMEM19	HGNC:25605; Q96HH6
16843	TMEM25	HGNC:25890; Q86YD3
16844	TMEM26	HGNC:28550; Q6ZUK4
16845	TMEM30A	HGNC:16667; Q9NV96
16846	TMEM30B	HGNC:27254; Q3MIR4
16847	TMEM31	HGNC:28601; Q5JXX7
16848	TMEM33	HGNC:25541; P57088
16849	TMEM35A	HGNC:25864; Q53FP2
16850	TMEM35B	HGNC:40021; Q8NCS4
16851	TMEM37	HGNC:18216; Q8WXS4
16852	TMEM38A	HGNC:28462; Q9H6F2
16853	TMEM38B	HGNC:25535; Q9NVV0
16854	TMEM39A	HGNC:25600; Q9NV64
16855	TMEM39B	HGNC:25510; Q9GZU3
16856	TMEM40	HGNC:25620; Q8WWA1
16857	TMEM41A	HGNC:30544; Q96HV5
16858	TMEM41B	HGNC:28948; Q5BJD5
16859	TMEM42	HGNC:28444; Q69YG0
16860	TMEM43	HGNC:28472; Q9BTV4
16861	TMEM44	HGNC:25120; Q2T9K0
16862	TMEM45A	HGNC:25480; Q9NWC5
16863	TMEM45B	HGNC:25194; Q96B21
16864	TMEM47	HGNC:18515; Q9BQJ4
16865	TMEM50A	HGNC:30590; O95807
16866	TMEM50B	HGNC:1280; P56557
16867	TMEM51	HGNC:25488; Q9NW97
16868	TMEM52	HGNC:27916; Q8NDY8
16869	TMEM52B	HGNC:26438; Q4KMG9
16870	TMEM53	HGNC:26186; Q6P2H8
16871	TMEM54	HGNC:24143; Q969K7
16872	TMEM59	HGNC:1239; Q9BXS4
16873	TMEM59L	HGNC:13237; Q9UK28
16874	TMEM60	HGNC:21754; Q9H2L4
16875	TMEM61	HGNC:27296; Q8N0U2
16876	TMEM62	HGNC:26269; Q0P6H9
16877	TMEM63A	HGNC:29118; O94886
16878	TMEM63B	HGNC:17735; Q5T3F8
16879	TMEM63C	HGNC:23787; Q9P1W3
16880	TMEM64	HGNC:25441; Q6YI46
16881	TMEM65	HGNC:25203; Q6PI78
16882	TMEM67	HGNC:28396; Q5HYA8
16883	TMEM68	HGNC:26510; Q96MH6
16884	TMEM69	HGNC:28035; Q5SWH9
16885	TMEM70	HGNC:26050; Q9BUB7
16886	TMEM71	HGNC:26572; Q6P5X7
16887	TMEM72	HGNC:31658; A0PK05
16888	TMEM74	HGNC:26409; Q96NL1
16889	TMEM74B	HGNC:15893; Q9NUR3
16890	TMEM78	HGNC:32307; Q5T7P6
16891	TMEM79	HGNC:28196; Q9BSE2
16892	TMEM80	HGNC:27453; Q96HE8
16893	TMEM81	HGNC:32349; Q6P7N7
16894	TMEM82	HGNC:32350; A0PJX8
16895	TMEM86A	HGNC:26890; Q8N2M4
16896	TMEM86B	HGNC:28448; Q8N661
16897	TMEM87A	HGNC:24522; Q8NBN3
16898	TMEM87B	HGNC:25913; Q96K49
16899	TMEM88	HGNC:32371; Q6PEY1
16900	TMEM89	HGNC:32372; A2RUT3
16901	TMEM91	HGNC:32393; Q6ZNR0
16902	TMEM92	HGNC:26579; Q6UXU6
16903	TMEM94	HGNC:28983; Q12767
16904	TMEM95	HGNC:27898; Q3KNT9
16905	TMEM97	HGNC:28106; Q5BJF2
16906	TMEM98	HGNC:24529; Q9Y2Y6
16907	TMEM100	HGNC:25607; Q9NV29
16908	TMEM101	HGNC:28653; Q96IK0
16909	TMEM102	HGNC:26722; Q8N9M5
16910	TMEM106A	HGNC:28288; Q96A25
16911	TMEM106B	HGNC:22407; Q9NUM4
16912	TMEM106C	HGNC:28775; Q9BVX2
16913	TMEM107	HGNC:28128; Q6UX40
16914	TMEM108	HGNC:28451; Q6UXF1
16915	TMEM109	HGNC:28771; Q9BVC6
16916	TMEM114	HGNC:33227; B3SHH9
16917	TMEM115	HGNC:30055; Q12893
16918	TMEM116	HGNC:25084; Q8NCL8
16919	TMEM117	HGNC:25308; Q9H0C3
16920	TMEM119	HGNC:27884; Q4V9L6
16921	TMEM120A	HGNC:21697; Q9BXJ8
16922	TMEM120B	HGNC:32008; A0PK00
16923	TMEM121	HGNC:20511; Q9BTD3
16924	TMEM121B	HGNC:1844; Q9BXQ6
16925	TMEM123	HGNC:30138; Q8N131
16926	TMEM125	HGNC:28275; Q96AQ2
16927	TMEM126A	HGNC:25382; Q9H061
16928	TMEM126B	HGNC:30883; Q8IUX1
16929	TMEM127	HGNC:26038; O75204
16930	TMEM128	HGNC:28201; Q5BJH2
16931	TMEM129	HGNC:25137; A0AVI4
16932	TMEM130	HGNC:25429; Q8N3G9
16933	TMEM131	HGNC:30366; Q92545
16934	TMEM131L	HGNC:29146; A2VDJ0
16935	TMEM132A	HGNC:31092; Q24JP5
16936	TMEM132B	HGNC:29397; Q14DG7
16937	TMEM132C	HGNC:25436; Q8N3T6
16938	TMEM132D	HGNC:29411; Q14C87
16939	TMEM132E	HGNC:26991; Q6IEE7
16940	TMEM134	HGNC:26142; Q9H6X4
16941	TMEM135	HGNC:26167; Q86UB9
16942	TMEM138	HGNC:26944; Q9NPI0
16943	TMEM139	HGNC:22058; Q8IV31
16944	TMEM140	HGNC:21870; Q9NV12
16945	TMEM141	HGNC:28211; Q96I45
16946	TMEM143	HGNC:25603; Q96AN5
16947	TMEM144	HGNC:25633; Q7Z5S9
16948	TMEM145	HGNC:26912; Q8NBT3
16949	TMEM147	HGNC:30414; Q9BVK8
16950	TMEM150A	HGNC:24677; Q86TG1
16951	TMEM150B	HGNC:34415; A6NC51
16952	TMEM150C	HGNC:37263; B9EJG8
16953	TMEM151A	HGNC:28497; Q8N4L1
16954	TMEM151B	HGNC:21315; Q8IW70
16955	TMEM154	HGNC:26489; Q6P9G4
16956	TMEM156	HGNC:26260; Q8N614
16957	TMEM158	HGNC:30293; Q8WZ71
16958	TMEM160	HGNC:26042; Q9NX00
16959	TMEM161A	HGNC:26020; Q9NX61
16960	TMEM161B	HGNC:28483; Q8NDZ6
16961	TMEM163	HGNC:25380; Q8TC26
16962	TMEM164	HGNC:26217; Q5U3C3
16963	TMEM165	HGNC:30760; Q9HC07
16964	TMEM167A	HGNC:28330; Q8TBQ9
16965	TMEM167B	HGNC:30187; Q9NRX6
16966	TMEM168	HGNC:25826; Q9H0V1
16967	TMEM169	HGNC:25130; Q96HH4
16968	TMEM170A	HGNC:29577; Q8WVE7
16969	TMEM170B	HGNC:34244; Q5T4T1
16970	TMEM171	HGNC:27031; Q8WVE6
16971	TMEM174	HGNC:28187; Q8WUU8
16972	TMEM175	HGNC:28709; Q9BSA9
16973	TMEM176A	HGNC:24930; Q96HP8
16974	TMEM176B	HGNC:29596; Q3YBM2
16975	TMEM177	HGNC:28143; Q53S58
16976	TMEM178A	HGNC:28517; Q8NBL3
16977	TMEM178B	HGNC:44112; H3BS89
16978	TMEM179	HGNC:20137; Q6ZVK1
16979	TMEM179B	HGNC:33744; Q7Z7N9
16980	TMEM181	HGNC:20958; Q9P2C4
16981	TMEM182	HGNC:26391; Q6ZP80
16982	TMEM183A	HGNC:20173; Q8IXX5
16983	TMEM184A	HGNC:28797; Q6ZMB5
16984	TMEM184B	HGNC:1310; Q9Y519
16985	TMEM184C	HGNC:25587; Q9NVA4
16986	TMEM185A	HGNC:17125; Q8NFB2
16987	TMEM185B	HGNC:18896; Q9H7F4
16988	TMEM186	HGNC:24530; Q96B77
16989	TMEM187	HGNC:13705; Q14656
16990	TMEM190	HGNC:29632; Q8WZ59
16991	TMEM191B	HGNC:33600; P0C7N4
16992	TMEM191C	HGNC:33601; A6NGB0
16993	TMEM192	HGNC:26775; Q8IY95
16994	TMEM196	HGNC:22431; Q5HYL7
16995	TMEM198	HGNC:33704; Q66K66
16996	TMEM200A	HGNC:21075; Q86VY9
16997	TMEM200B	HGNC:33785; Q69YZ2
16998	TMEM200C	HGNC:37208; A6NKL6
16999	TMEM201	HGNC:33719; Q5SNT2
17000	TMEM202	HGNC:33733; A6NGA9
17001	TMEM203	HGNC:28217; Q969S6
17002	TMEM204	HGNC:14158; Q9BSN7
17003	TMEM205	HGNC:29631; Q6UW68
17004	TMEM207	HGNC:33705; Q6UWW9
17005	TMEM208	HGNC:25015; Q9BTX3
17006	TMEM209	HGNC:21898; Q96SK2
17007	TMEM210	HGNC:34059; A6NLX4
17008	TMEM212	HGNC:34295; A6NML5
17009	TMEM213	HGNC:27220; A2RRL7
17010	TMEM214	HGNC:25983; Q6NUQ4
17011	TMEM215	HGNC:33816; Q68D42
17012	TMEM216	HGNC:25018; Q9P0N5
17013	TMEM217	HGNC:21238; Q8N7C4
17014	TMEM217B	HGNC:55922; A0A494BZU4
17015	TMEM218	HGNC:27344; A2RU14
17016	TMEM219	HGNC:25201; Q86XT9
17017	TMEM220	HGNC:33757; Q6QAJ8
17018	TMEM221	HGNC:21943; A6NGB7
17019	TMEM222	HGNC:25363; Q9H0R3
17020	TMEM223	HGNC:28464; A0PJW6
17021	TMEM225	HGNC:32390; Q6GV28
17022	TMEM225B	HGNC:53075; P0DP42
17023	TMEM229A	HGNC:37279; B2RXF0
17024	TMEM229B	HGNC:20130; Q8NBD8
17025	TMEM230	HGNC:15876; Q96A57
17026	TMEM231	HGNC:37234; Q9H6L2
17027	TMEM232	HGNC:37270; C9JQI7
17028	TMEM233	HGNC:37219; B4DJY2
17029	TMEM234	HGNC:28837; Q8WY98
17030	TMEM235	HGNC:27563; A6NFC5
17031	TMEM236	HGNC:23473; Q5W0B7
17032	TMEM237	HGNC:14432; Q96Q45
17033	TMEM238	HGNC:40042; C9JI98
17034	TMEM238L	HGNC:44356; A6NJY4
17035	TMEM239	HGNC:40044; Q8WW34
17036	TMEM240	HGNC:25186; Q5SV17
17037	TMEM242	HGNC:17206; Q9NWH2
17038	TMEM243	HGNC:21707; Q9BU79
17039	TMEM244	HGNC:21571; Q5VVB8
17040	TMEM245	HGNC:1363; Q9H330
17041	TMEM247	HGNC:42967; A6NEH6
17042	TMEM248	HGNC:25476; Q9NWD8
17043	TMEM250	HGNC:31009; H0YL14
17044	TMEM252	HGNC:28537; Q8N6L7
17045	TMEM253	HGNC:32545; P0C7T8
17046	TMEM254	HGNC:25804; Q8TBM7
17047	TMEM255A	HGNC:26086; Q5JRV8
17048	TMEM255B	HGNC:28297; Q8WV15
17049	TMEM256	HGNC:28618; Q8N2U0
17050	TMEM258	HGNC:1164; P61165
17051	TMEM259	HGNC:17039; Q4ZIN3
17052	TMEM260	HGNC:20185; Q9NX78
17053	TMEM263	HGNC:28281; Q8WUH6
17054	TMEM265	HGNC:51241; A0A087WTH1
17055	TMEM266	HGNC:26763; Q2M3C6
17056	TMEM267	HGNC:26139; Q0VDI3
17057	TMEM268	HGNC:24513; Q5VZI3
17058	TMEM269	HGNC:52381; A0A1B0GVZ9
17059	TMEM270	HGNC:23018; Q6UE05
17060	TMEM271	HGNC:53639; A0A286YF58
17061	TMEM272	HGNC:26737; A0A1B0GTI8
17062	TMEM273	HGNC:27274; Q5T292
17063	TMEM275	HGNC:53938; A0A0U1RQS6
17064	TMEM276	HGNC:56235; P0DTL5
17065	TMEM278	HGNC:37099; A6NKF7
17066	TMF1	HGNC:11870; P82094
17067	TMIE	HGNC:30800; Q8NEW7
17068	TMIGD1	HGNC:32431; Q6UXZ0
17069	TMIGD2	HGNC:28324; Q96BF3
17070	TMIGD3	HGNC:51375; P0DMS9
17071	TMLHE	HGNC:18308; Q9NVH6
17072	TMOD1	HGNC:11871; P28289
17073	TMOD2	HGNC:11872; Q9NZR1
17074	TMOD3	HGNC:11873; Q9NYL9
17075	TMOD4	HGNC:11874; Q9NZQ9
17076	TMPO	HGNC:11875; P42166, P42167
17077	TMPPE	HGNC:33865; Q6ZT21
17078	TMPRSS2	HGNC:11876; O15393
17079	TMPRSS3	HGNC:11877; P57727
17080	TMPRSS4	HGNC:11878; Q9NRS4
17081	TMPRSS5	HGNC:14908; Q9H3S3
17082	TMPRSS6	HGNC:16517; Q8IU80
17083	TMPRSS7	HGNC:30846; Q7RTY8
17084	TMPRSS9	HGNC:30079; Q7Z410
17085	TMPRSS11A	HGNC:27954; Q6ZMR5
17086	TMPRSS11B	HGNC:25398; Q86T26
17087	TMPRSS11D	HGNC:24059; O60235
17088	TMPRSS11E	HGNC:24465; Q9UL52
17089	TMPRSS11F	HGNC:29994; Q6ZWK6
17090	TMPRSS12	HGNC:28779; Q86WS5
17091	TMPRSS13	HGNC:29808; Q9BYE2
17092	TMPRSS15	HGNC:9490; P98073
17093	TMSB4X	HGNC:11881; P62328
17094	TMSB4Y	HGNC:11882; O14604
17095	TMSB10	HGNC:11879; P63313
17096	TMSB15A	HGNC:30744; P0CG34
17097	TMSB15B	HGNC:28612; P0CG35
17098	TMSB15C	HGNC:55173; P0DX04
17099	TMT1A	HGNC:24550; Q9H8H3
17100	TMT1B	HGNC:28276; Q6UX53
17101	TMTC1	HGNC:24099; Q8IUR5
17102	TMTC2	HGNC:25440; Q8N394
17103	TMTC3	HGNC:26899; Q6ZXV5
17104	TMTC4	HGNC:25904; Q5T4D3
17105	TMUB1	HGNC:21709; Q9BVT8
17106	TMUB2	HGNC:28459; Q71RG4
17107	TMX1	HGNC:15487; Q9H3N1
17108	TMX2	HGNC:30739; Q9Y320
17109	TMX3	HGNC:24718; Q96JJ7
17110	TMX4	HGNC:25237; Q9H1E5
17111	TNC	HGNC:5318; P24821
17112	TNF	HGNC:11892; P01375
17113	TNFAIP1	HGNC:11894; Q13829
17114	TNFAIP2	HGNC:11895; Q03169
17115	TNFAIP3	HGNC:11896; P21580
17116	TNFAIP6	HGNC:11898; P98066
17117	TNFAIP8	HGNC:17260; O95379
17118	TNFAIP8L1	HGNC:28279; Q8WVP5
17119	TNFAIP8L2	HGNC:26277; Q6P589
17120	TNFAIP8L3	HGNC:20620; Q5GJ75
17121	TNFRSF1A	HGNC:11916; P19438
17122	TNFRSF1B	HGNC:11917; P20333
17123	TNFRSF4	HGNC:11918; P43489
17124	TNFRSF6B	HGNC:11921; O95407
17125	TNFRSF8	HGNC:11923; P28908
17126	TNFRSF9	HGNC:11924; Q07011
17127	TNFRSF10A	HGNC:11904; O00220
17128	TNFRSF10B	HGNC:11905; O14763
17129	TNFRSF10C	HGNC:11906; O14798
17130	TNFRSF10D	HGNC:11907; Q9UBN6
17131	TNFRSF11A	HGNC:11908; Q9Y6Q6
17132	TNFRSF11B	HGNC:11909; O00300
17133	TNFRSF12A	HGNC:18152; Q9NP84
17134	TNFRSF13B	HGNC:18153; O14836
17135	TNFRSF13C	HGNC:17755; Q96RJ3
17136	TNFRSF14	HGNC:11912; Q92956
17137	TNFRSF17	HGNC:11913; Q02223
17138	TNFRSF18	HGNC:11914; Q9Y5U5
17139	TNFRSF19	HGNC:11915; Q9NS68
17140	TNFRSF21	HGNC:13469; O75509
17141	TNFRSF25	HGNC:11910; Q93038
17142	TNFSF4	HGNC:11934; P23510
17143	TNFSF8	HGNC:11938; P32971
17144	TNFSF9	HGNC:11939; P41273
17145	TNFSF10	HGNC:11925; P50591
17146	TNFSF11	HGNC:11926; O14788
17147	TNFSF12	HGNC:11927; O43508
17148	TNFSF13	HGNC:11928; O75888
17149	TNFSF13B	HGNC:11929; Q9Y275
17150	TNFSF14	HGNC:11930; O43557
17151	TNFSF15	HGNC:11931; O95150
17152	TNFSF18	HGNC:11932; Q9UNG2
17153	TNIK	HGNC:30765; Q9UKE5
17154	TNIP1	HGNC:16903; Q15025
17155	TNIP2	HGNC:19118; Q8NFZ5
17156	TNIP3	HGNC:19315; Q96KP6
17157	TNK1	HGNC:11940; Q13470
17158	TNK2	HGNC:19297; Q07912
17159	TNKS	HGNC:11941; O95271
17160	TNKS1BP1	HGNC:19081; Q9C0C2
17161	TNKS2	HGNC:15677; Q9H2K2
17162	TNMD	HGNC:17757; Q9H2S6
17163	TNN	HGNC:22942; Q9UQP3
17164	TNNC1	HGNC:11943; P63316
17165	TNNC2	HGNC:11944; P02585
17166	TNNI1	HGNC:11945; P19237
17167	TNNI2	HGNC:11946; P48788
17168	TNNI3	HGNC:11947; P19429
17169	TNNI3K	HGNC:19661; Q59H18
17170	TNNT1	HGNC:11948; P13805
17171	TNNT2	HGNC:11949; P45379
17172	TNNT3	HGNC:11950; P45378
17173	TNP1	HGNC:11951; P09430
17174	TNP2	HGNC:11952; Q05952
17175	TNPO1	HGNC:6401; Q92973
17176	TNPO2	HGNC:19998; O14787
17177	TNPO3	HGNC:17103; Q9Y5L0
17178	TNR	HGNC:11953; Q92752
17179	TNRC6A	HGNC:11969; Q8NDV7
17180	TNRC6B	HGNC:29190; Q9UPQ9
17181	TNRC6C	HGNC:29318; Q9HCJ0
17182	TNRC18	HGNC:11962; O15417
17183	TNS1	HGNC:11973; Q9HBL0
17184	TNS2	HGNC:19737; Q63HR2
17185	TNS3	HGNC:21616; Q68CZ2
17186	TNS4	HGNC:24352; Q8IZW8
17187	TNXB	HGNC:11976; P22105
17188	TOB1	HGNC:11979; P50616
17189	TOB2	HGNC:11980; Q14106
17190	TOE1	HGNC:15954; Q96GM8
17191	TOGARAM1	HGNC:19959; Q9Y4F4
17192	TOGARAM2	HGNC:33715; Q6ZUX3
17193	TOLLIP	HGNC:16476; Q9H0E2
17194	TOM1	HGNC:11982; O60784
17195	TOM1L1	HGNC:11983; O75674
17196	TOM1L2	HGNC:11984; Q6ZVM7
17197	TOMM5	HGNC:31369; Q8N4H5
17198	TOMM6	HGNC:34528; Q96B49
17199	TOMM7	HGNC:21648; Q9P0U1
17200	TOMM20	HGNC:20947; Q15388
17201	TOMM20L	HGNC:33752; Q6UXN7
17202	TOMM22	HGNC:18002; Q9NS69
17203	TOMM34	HGNC:15746; Q15785
17204	TOMM40	HGNC:18001; O96008
17205	TOMM40L	HGNC:25756; Q969M1
17206	TOMM70	HGNC:11985; O94826
17207	TOMT	HGNC:55527; Q8WZ04
17208	TONSL	HGNC:7801; Q96HA7
17209	TOP1	HGNC:11986; P11387
17210	TOP1MT	HGNC:29787; Q969P6
17211	TOP2A	HGNC:11989; P11388
17212	TOP2B	HGNC:11990; Q02880
17213	TOP3A	HGNC:11992; Q13472
17214	TOP3B	HGNC:11993; O95985
17215	TOP6BL	HGNC:26197; Q8N6T0
17216	TOPAZ1	HGNC:24746; Q8N9V7
17217	TOPBP1	HGNC:17008; Q92547
17218	TOPORS	HGNC:21653; Q9NS56
17219	TOR1A	HGNC:3098; O14656
17220	TOR1AIP1	HGNC:29456; Q5JTV8
17221	TOR1AIP2	HGNC:24055; Q8NFQ8, Q9H496
17222	TOR1B	HGNC:11995; O14657
17223	TOR2A	HGNC:11996; Q5JU69, Q8N2E6
17224	TOR3A	HGNC:11997; Q9H497
17225	TOR4A	HGNC:25981; Q9NXH8
17226	TOX	HGNC:18988; O94900
17227	TOX2	HGNC:16095; Q96NM4
17228	TOX3	HGNC:11972; O15405
17229	TOX4	HGNC:20161; O94842
17230	TP53	HGNC:11998; P04637
17231	TP53AIP1	HGNC:29984; Q9HCN2
17232	TP53BP1	HGNC:11999; Q12888
17233	TP53BP2	HGNC:12000; Q13625
17234	TP53I3	HGNC:19373; Q53FA7
17235	TP53I11	HGNC:16842; O14683
17236	TP53I13	HGNC:25102; Q8NBR0
17237	TP53INP1	HGNC:18022; Q96A56
17238	TP53INP2	HGNC:16104; Q8IXH6
17239	TP53RK	HGNC:16197; Q96S44
17240	TP53TG3	HGNC:30759; Q9ULZ0
17241	TP53TG3B	HGNC:37202; Q9ULZ0
17242	TP53TG3C	HGNC:42962; Q9ULZ0
17243	TP53TG3D	HGNC:44657; Q9ULZ0
17244	TP53TG3E	HGNC:51816; Q9ULZ0
17245	TP53TG3F	HGNC:51817; Q9ULZ0
17246	TP53TG5	HGNC:15856; Q9Y2B4
17247	TP63	HGNC:15979; Q9H3D4
17248	TP73	HGNC:12003; O15350
17249	TPBG	HGNC:12004; Q13641
17250	TPBGL	HGNC:44159; P0DKB5
17251	TPCN1	HGNC:18182; Q9ULQ1
17252	TPCN2	HGNC:20820; Q8NHX9
17253	TPD52	HGNC:12005; P55327
17254	TPD52L1	HGNC:12006; Q16890
17255	TPD52L2	HGNC:12007; O43399
17256	TPD52L3	HGNC:23382; Q96J77
17257	TPGS1	HGNC:25058; Q6ZTW0
17258	TPGS2	HGNC:24561; Q68CL5
17259	TPH1	HGNC:12008; P17752
17260	TPH2	HGNC:20692; Q8IWU9
17261	TPI1	HGNC:12009; P60174
17262	TPK1	HGNC:17358; Q9H3S4
17263	TPM1	HGNC:12010; P09493
17264	TPM2	HGNC:12011; P07951
17265	TPM3	HGNC:12012; P06753
17266	TPM4	HGNC:12013; P67936
17267	TPMT	HGNC:12014; P51580
17268	TPO	HGNC:12015; P07202
17269	TPP1	HGNC:2073; O14773
17270	TPP2	HGNC:12016; P29144
17271	TPPP	HGNC:24164; O94811
17272	TPPP2	HGNC:19293; P59282
17273	TPPP3	HGNC:24162; Q9BW30
17274	TPR	HGNC:12017; P12270
17275	TPRA1	HGNC:30413; Q86W33
17276	TPRG1	HGNC:24759; Q6ZUI0
17277	TPRG1L	HGNC:27007; Q5T0D9
17278	TPRKB	HGNC:24259; Q9Y3C4
17279	TPRN	HGNC:26894; Q4KMQ1
17280	TPRX1	HGNC:32174; Q8N7U7
17281	TPRX2	HGNC:32175; P0DV77
17282	TPSAB1	HGNC:12019; Q15661
17283	TPSB2	HGNC:14120; P20231
17284	TPSD1	HGNC:14118; Q9BZJ3
17285	TPSG1	HGNC:14134; Q9NRR2
17286	TPST1	HGNC:12020; O60507
17287	TPST2	HGNC:12021; O60704
17288	TPT1	HGNC:12022; P13693
17289	TPTE	HGNC:12023; P56180
17290	TPTE2	HGNC:17299; Q6XPS3
17291	TPX2	HGNC:1249; Q9ULW0
17292	TRA	HGNC:12027; P0DSE1, P0DTU3
17293	TRA2A	HGNC:16645; Q13595
17294	TRA2B	HGNC:10781; P62995
17295	TRABD	HGNC:28805; Q9H4I3
17296	TRABD2A	HGNC:27013; Q86V40
17297	TRABD2B	HGNC:44200; A6NFA1
17298	TRADD	HGNC:12030; Q15628
17299	TRAF1	HGNC:12031; Q13077
17300	TRAF2	HGNC:12032; Q12933
17301	TRAF3	HGNC:12033; Q13114
17302	TRAF3IP1	HGNC:17861; Q8TDR0
17303	TRAF3IP2	HGNC:1343; O43734
17304	TRAF3IP3	HGNC:30766; Q9Y228
17305	TRAF4	HGNC:12034; Q9BUZ4
17306	TRAF5	HGNC:12035; O00463
17307	TRAF6	HGNC:12036; Q9Y4K3
17308	TRAF7	HGNC:20456; Q6Q0C0
17309	TRAFD1	HGNC:24808; O14545
17310	TRAIP	HGNC:30764; Q9BWF2
17311	TRAK1	HGNC:29947; Q9UPV9
17312	TRAK2	HGNC:13206; O60296
17313	TRAM1	HGNC:20568; Q15629
17314	TRAM1L1	HGNC:28371; Q8N609
17315	TRAM2	HGNC:16855; Q15035
17316	TRANK1	HGNC:29011; O15050
17317	TRAP1	HGNC:16264; Q12931
17318	TRAPPC1	HGNC:19894; Q9Y5R8
17319	TRAPPC2	HGNC:23068; P0DI81
17320	TRAPPC2B	HGNC:10710; P0DI82
17321	TRAPPC2L	HGNC:30887; Q9UL33
17322	TRAPPC3	HGNC:19942; O43617
17323	TRAPPC3L	HGNC:21090; Q5T215
17324	TRAPPC4	HGNC:19943; Q9Y296
17325	TRAPPC5	HGNC:23067; Q8IUR0
17326	TRAPPC6A	HGNC:23069; O75865
17327	TRAPPC6B	HGNC:23066; Q86SZ2
17328	TRAPPC8	HGNC:29169; Q9Y2L5
17329	TRAPPC9	HGNC:30832; Q96Q05
17330	TRAPPC10	HGNC:11868; P48553
17331	TRAPPC11	HGNC:25751; Q7Z392
17332	TRAPPC12	HGNC:24284; Q8WVT3
17333	TRAPPC13	HGNC:25828; A5PLN9
17334	TRAPPC14	HGNC:25604; Q8WVR3
17335	TRARG1	HGNC:29592; Q8IXB3
17336	TRAT1	HGNC:30698; Q6PIZ9
17337	TRB	HGNC:12155; P0DSE2, P0DTU4
17338	TRD	HGNC:12252
17339	TRDMT1	HGNC:2977; O14717
17340	TRDN	HGNC:12261; Q13061
17341	TREH	HGNC:12266; O43280
17342	TREM1	HGNC:17760; Q9NP99
17343	TREM2	HGNC:17761; Q9NZC2
17344	TREML1	HGNC:20434; Q86YW5
17345	TREML2	HGNC:21092; Q5T2D2
17346	TREML4	HGNC:30807; Q6UXN2
17347	TRERF1	HGNC:18273; Q96PN7
17348	TREX1	HGNC:12269; Q9NSU2
17349	TREX2	HGNC:12270; Q9BQ50
17350	TRG	HGNC:12271
17351	TRH	HGNC:12298; P20396
17352	TRHDE	HGNC:30748; Q9UKU6
17353	TRHR	HGNC:12299; P34981
17354	TRIAP1	HGNC:26937; O43715
17355	TRIB1	HGNC:16891; Q96RU8
17356	TRIB2	HGNC:30809; Q92519
17357	TRIB3	HGNC:16228; Q96RU7
17358	TRIL	HGNC:22200; Q7L0X0
17359	TRIM2	HGNC:15974; Q9C040
17360	TRIM3	HGNC:10064; O75382
17361	TRIM4	HGNC:16275; Q9C037
17362	TRIM5	HGNC:16276; Q9C035
17363	TRIM6	HGNC:16277; Q9C030
17364	TRIM7	HGNC:16278; Q9C029
17365	TRIM8	HGNC:15579; Q9BZR9
17366	TRIM9	HGNC:16288; Q9C026
17367	TRIM10	HGNC:10072; Q9UDY6
17368	TRIM11	HGNC:16281; Q96F44
17369	TRIM13	HGNC:9976; O60858
17370	TRIM14	HGNC:16283; Q14142
17371	TRIM15	HGNC:16284; Q9C019
17372	TRIM16	HGNC:17241; O95361
17373	TRIM17	HGNC:13430; Q9Y577
17374	TRIM21	HGNC:11312; P19474
17375	TRIM22	HGNC:16379; Q8IYM9
17376	TRIM23	HGNC:660; P36406
17377	TRIM24	HGNC:11812; O15164
17378	TRIM25	HGNC:12932; Q14258
17379	TRIM26	HGNC:12962; Q12899
17380	TRIM27	HGNC:9975; P14373
17381	TRIM28	HGNC:16384; Q13263
17382	TRIM29	HGNC:17274; Q14134
17383	TRIM31	HGNC:16289; Q9BZY9
17384	TRIM32	HGNC:16380; Q13049
17385	TRIM33	HGNC:16290; Q9UPN9
17386	TRIM34	HGNC:10063; Q9BYJ4
17387	TRIM35	HGNC:16285; Q9UPQ4
17388	TRIM36	HGNC:16280; Q9NQ86
17389	TRIM37	HGNC:7523; O94972
17390	TRIM38	HGNC:10059; O00635
17391	TRIM39	HGNC:10065; Q9HCM9
17392	TRIM40	HGNC:18736; Q6P9F5
17393	TRIM41	HGNC:19013; Q8WV44
17394	TRIM42	HGNC:19014; Q8IWZ5
17395	TRIM43	HGNC:19015; Q96BQ3
17396	TRIM43B	HGNC:37146; A6NCK2
17397	TRIM44	HGNC:19016; Q96DX7
17398	TRIM45	HGNC:19018; Q9H8W5
17399	TRIM46	HGNC:19019; Q7Z4K8
17400	TRIM47	HGNC:19020; Q96LD4
17401	TRIM48	HGNC:19021; Q8IWZ4
17402	TRIM49	HGNC:13431; P0CI25
17403	TRIM49B	HGNC:42955; A6NDI0
17404	TRIM49C	HGNC:38877; P0CI26
17405	TRIM49D1	HGNC:43973; C9J1S8
17406	TRIM49D2	HGNC:37217; C9J1S8
17407	TRIM50	HGNC:19017; Q86XT4
17408	TRIM51	HGNC:19023; Q9BSJ1
17409	TRIM51G	HGNC:43972; A0A3B3IT33
17410	TRIM52	HGNC:19024; Q96A61
17411	TRIM54	HGNC:16008; Q9BYV2
17412	TRIM55	HGNC:14215; Q9BYV6
17413	TRIM56	HGNC:19028; Q9BRZ2
17414	TRIM58	HGNC:24150; Q8NG06
17415	TRIM59	HGNC:30834; Q8IWR1
17416	TRIM60	HGNC:21162; Q495X7
17417	TRIM61	HGNC:24339; Q5EBN2
17418	TRIM62	HGNC:25574; Q9BVG3
17419	TRIM63	HGNC:16007; Q969Q1
17420	TRIM64	HGNC:14663; A6NGJ6
17421	TRIM64B	HGNC:37147; A6NI03
17422	TRIM64C	HGNC:37148; A6NLI5
17423	TRIM65	HGNC:27316; Q6PJ69
17424	TRIM66	HGNC:29005; O15016
17425	TRIM67	HGNC:31859; Q6ZTA4
17426	TRIM68	HGNC:21161; Q6AZZ1
17427	TRIM69	HGNC:17857; Q86WT6
17428	TRIM71	HGNC:32669; Q2Q1W2
17429	TRIM72	HGNC:32671; Q6ZMU5
17430	TRIM73	HGNC:18162; Q86UV7
17431	TRIM74	HGNC:17453; Q86UV6
17432	TRIM75	HGNC:32686; A6NK02
17433	TRIM77	HGNC:34228; I1YAP6
17434	TRIML1	HGNC:26698; Q8N9V2
17435	TRIML2	HGNC:26378; Q8N7C3
17436	TRIO	HGNC:12303; O75962
17437	TRIOBP	HGNC:17009; Q9H2D6
17438	TRIP4	HGNC:12310; Q15650
17439	TRIP6	HGNC:12311; Q15654
17440	TRIP10	HGNC:12304; Q15642
17441	TRIP11	HGNC:12305; Q15643
17442	TRIP12	HGNC:12306; Q14669
17443	TRIP13	HGNC:12307; Q15645
17444	TRIQK	HGNC:27828; Q629K1
17445	TRIR	HGNC:28424; Q9BQ61
17446	TRIT1	HGNC:20286; Q9H3H1
17447	TRMO	HGNC:30967; Q9BU70
17448	TRMT1	HGNC:25980; Q9NXH9
17449	TRMT1L	HGNC:16782; Q7Z2T5
17450	TRMT2A	HGNC:24974; Q8IZ69
17451	TRMT2B	HGNC:25748; Q96GJ1
17452	TRMT5	HGNC:23141; Q32P41
17453	TRMT6	HGNC:20900; Q9UJA5
17454	TRMT9B	HGNC:26725; Q9P272
17455	TRMT10A	HGNC:28403; Q8TBZ6
17456	TRMT10B	HGNC:26454; Q6PF06
17457	TRMT10C	HGNC:26022; Q7L0Y3
17458	TRMT11	HGNC:21080; Q7Z4G4
17459	TRMT13	HGNC:25502; Q9NUP7
17460	TRMT44	HGNC:26653; Q8IYL2
17461	TRMT61A	HGNC:23790; Q96FX7
17462	TRMT61B	HGNC:26070; Q9BVS5
17463	TRMT112	HGNC:26940; Q9UI30
17464	TRMU	HGNC:25481; O75648
17465	TRNAU1AP	HGNC:30813; Q9NX07
17466	TRNP1	HGNC:34348; Q6NT89
17467	TRNT1	HGNC:17341; Q96Q11
17468	TRO	HGNC:12326; Q12816
17469	TROAP	HGNC:12327; Q12815
17470	TRPA1	HGNC:497; O75762
17471	TRPC1	HGNC:12333; P48995
17472	TRPC3	HGNC:12335; Q13507
17473	TRPC4	HGNC:12336; Q9UBN4
17474	TRPC4AP	HGNC:16181; Q8TEL6
17475	TRPC5	HGNC:12337; Q9UL62
17476	TRPC5OS	HGNC:40593; A6NMA1
17477	TRPC6	HGNC:12338; Q9Y210
17478	TRPC7	HGNC:20754; Q9HCX4
17479	TRPM1	HGNC:7146; Q7Z4N2
17480	TRPM2	HGNC:12339; O94759
17481	TRPM3	HGNC:17992; Q9HCF6
17482	TRPM4	HGNC:17993; Q8TD43
17483	TRPM5	HGNC:14323; Q9NZQ8
17484	TRPM6	HGNC:17995; Q9BX84
17485	TRPM7	HGNC:17994; Q96QT4
17486	TRPM8	HGNC:17961; Q7Z2W7
17487	TRPS1	HGNC:12340; Q9UHF7
17488	TRPT1	HGNC:20316; Q86TN4
17489	TRPV1	HGNC:12716; Q8NER1
17490	TRPV2	HGNC:18082; Q9Y5S1
17491	TRPV3	HGNC:18084; Q8NET8
17492	TRPV4	HGNC:18083; Q9HBA0
17493	TRPV5	HGNC:3145; Q9NQA5
17494	TRPV6	HGNC:14006; Q9H1D0
17495	TRRAP	HGNC:12347; Q9Y4A5
17496	TRUB1	HGNC:16060; Q8WWH5
17497	TRUB2	HGNC:17170; O95900
17498	TSACC	HGNC:30636; Q96A04
17499	TSBP1	HGNC:13922; Q5SRN2
17500	TSC1	HGNC:12362; Q92574
17501	TSC2	HGNC:12363; P49815
17502	TSC22D1	HGNC:16826; Q15714
17503	TSC22D2	HGNC:29095; O75157
17504	TSC22D3	HGNC:3051; Q99576
17505	TSC22D4	HGNC:21696; Q9Y3Q8
17506	TSEN2	HGNC:28422; Q8NCE0
17507	TSEN15	HGNC:16791; Q8WW01
17508	TSEN34	HGNC:15506; Q9BSV6
17509	TSEN54	HGNC:27561; Q7Z6J9
17510	TSFM	HGNC:12367; P43897
17511	TSG101	HGNC:15971; Q99816
17512	TSGA10	HGNC:14927; Q9BZW7
17513	TSGA10IP	HGNC:26555; Q3SY00
17514	TSGA13	HGNC:12369; Q96PP4
17515	TSHB	HGNC:12372; P01222
17516	TSHR	HGNC:12373; P16473
17517	TSHZ1	HGNC:10669; Q6ZSZ6
17518	TSHZ2	HGNC:13010; Q9NRE2
17519	TSHZ3	HGNC:30700; Q63HK5
17520	TSKS	HGNC:30719; Q9UJT2
17521	TSKU	HGNC:28850; Q8WUA8
17522	TSLP	HGNC:30743; Q969D9
17523	TSN	HGNC:12379; Q15631
17524	TSNARE1	HGNC:26437; Q96NA8
17525	TSNAX	HGNC:12380; Q99598
17526	TSNAXIP1	HGNC:18586; Q2TAA8
17527	TSPAN1	HGNC:20657; O60635
17528	TSPAN2	HGNC:20659; O60636
17529	TSPAN3	HGNC:17752; O60637
17530	TSPAN4	HGNC:11859; O14817
17531	TSPAN5	HGNC:17753; P62079
17532	TSPAN6	HGNC:11858; O43657
17533	TSPAN7	HGNC:11854; P41732
17534	TSPAN8	HGNC:11855; P19075
17535	TSPAN9	HGNC:21640; O75954
17536	TSPAN10	HGNC:29942; Q9H1Z9
17537	TSPAN11	HGNC:30795; A1L157
17538	TSPAN12	HGNC:21641; O95859
17539	TSPAN13	HGNC:21643; O95857
17540	TSPAN14	HGNC:23303; Q8NG11
17541	TSPAN15	HGNC:23298; O95858
17542	TSPAN16	HGNC:30725; Q9UKR8
17543	TSPAN17	HGNC:13594; Q96FV3
17544	TSPAN18	HGNC:20660; Q96SJ8
17545	TSPAN19	HGNC:31886; P0C672
17546	TSPAN31	HGNC:10539; Q12999
17547	TSPAN32	HGNC:13410; Q96QS1
17548	TSPAN33	HGNC:28743; Q86UF1
17549	TSPEAR	HGNC:1268; Q8WU66
17550	TSPO	HGNC:1158; B1AH88, P30536
17551	TSPO2	HGNC:21256; Q5TGU0
17552	TSPOAP1	HGNC:16831; O95153
17553	TSPY1	HGNC:12381; Q01534
17554	TSPY2	HGNC:23924; A6NKD2
17555	TSPY3	HGNC:33876; P0CV98
17556	TSPY4	HGNC:37287; P0CV99
17557	TSPY8	HGNC:37471; P0CW00
17558	TSPY9	HGNC:37472; A0A494C1R9
17559	TSPY10	HGNC:37473; P0CW01
17560	TSPYL1	HGNC:12382; Q9H0U9
17561	TSPYL2	HGNC:24358; Q9H2G4
17562	TSPYL4	HGNC:21559; Q9UJ04
17563	TSPYL5	HGNC:29367; Q86VY4
17564	TSPYL6	HGNC:14521; Q8N831
17565	TSR1	HGNC:25542; Q2NL82
17566	TSR2	HGNC:25455; Q969E8
17567	TSR3	HGNC:14175; Q9UJK0
17568	TSSC4	HGNC:12386; Q9Y5U2
17569	TSSK1B	HGNC:14968; Q9BXA7
17570	TSSK2	HGNC:11401; Q96PF2
17571	TSSK3	HGNC:15473; Q96PN8
17572	TSSK4	HGNC:19825; Q6SA08
17573	TSSK6	HGNC:30410; Q9BXA6
17574	TST	HGNC:12388; Q16762
17575	TSTD1	HGNC:35410; Q8NFU3
17576	TSTD2	HGNC:30087; Q5T7W7
17577	TSTD3	HGNC:40910; H0UI37
17578	TTBK1	HGNC:19140; Q5TCY1
17579	TTBK2	HGNC:19141; Q6IQ55
17580	TTC1	HGNC:12391; Q99614
17581	TTC3	HGNC:12393; P53804
17582	TTC4	HGNC:12394; O95801
17583	TTC5	HGNC:19274; Q8N0Z6
17584	TTC6	HGNC:19739; Q86TZ1
17585	TTC7A	HGNC:19750; Q9ULT0
17586	TTC7B	HGNC:19858; Q86TV6
17587	TTC8	HGNC:20087; Q8TAM2
17588	TTC9	HGNC:20267; Q92623
17589	TTC9B	HGNC:26395; Q8N6N2
17590	TTC9C	HGNC:28432; Q8N5M4
17591	TTC12	HGNC:23700; Q9H892
17592	TTC13	HGNC:26204; Q8NBP0
17593	TTC14	HGNC:24697; Q96N46
17594	TTC16	HGNC:26536; Q8NEE8
17595	TTC17	HGNC:25596; Q96AE7
17596	TTC19	HGNC:26006; Q6DKK2
17597	TTC21A	HGNC:30761; Q8NDW8
17598	TTC21B	HGNC:25660; Q7Z4L5
17599	TTC22	HGNC:26067; Q5TAA0
17600	TTC23	HGNC:25730; Q5W5X9
17601	TTC23L	HGNC:26355; Q6PF05
17602	TTC24	HGNC:32348; A2A3L6
17603	TTC27	HGNC:25986; Q6P3X3
17604	TTC28	HGNC:29179; Q96AY4
17605	TTC29	HGNC:29936; Q8NA56
17606	TTC31	HGNC:25759; Q49AM3
17607	TTC32	HGNC:32954; Q5I0X7
17608	TTC33	HGNC:29959; Q6PID6
17609	TTC34	HGNC:34297; A8MYJ7
17610	TTC36	HGNC:33708; A6NLP5
17611	TTC38	HGNC:26082; Q5R3I4
17612	TTC39A	HGNC:18657; Q5SRH9
17613	TTC39B	HGNC:23704; Q5VTQ0
17614	TTC39C	HGNC:26595; Q8N584
17615	TTF1	HGNC:12397; Q15361
17616	TTF2	HGNC:12398; Q9UNY4
17617	TTI1	HGNC:29029; O43156
17618	TTI2	HGNC:26262; Q6NXR4
17619	TTK	HGNC:12401; P33981
17620	TTL	HGNC:21586; Q8NG68
17621	TTLL1	HGNC:1312; O95922
17622	TTLL2	HGNC:21211; Q9BWV7
17623	TTLL3	HGNC:24483; Q9Y4R7
17624	TTLL4	HGNC:28976; Q14679
17625	TTLL5	HGNC:19963; Q6EMB2
17626	TTLL6	HGNC:26664; Q8N841
17627	TTLL7	HGNC:26242; Q6ZT98
17628	TTLL8	HGNC:34000; A6PVC2
17629	TTLL9	HGNC:16118; Q3SXZ7
17630	TTLL10	HGNC:26693; Q6ZVT0
17631	TTLL11	HGNC:18113; Q8NHH1
17632	TTLL12	HGNC:28974; Q14166
17633	TTLL13	HGNC:32484; A6NNM8
17634	TTN	HGNC:12403; Q8WZ42
17635	TTPA	HGNC:12404; P49638
17636	TTPAL	HGNC:16114; Q9BTX7
17637	TTR	HGNC:12405; P02766
17638	TTYH1	HGNC:13476; Q9H313
17639	TTYH2	HGNC:13877; Q9BSA4
17640	TTYH3	HGNC:22222; Q9C0H2
17641	TUB	HGNC:12406; P50607
17642	TUBA1A	HGNC:20766; Q71U36
17643	TUBA1B	HGNC:18809; P68363
17644	TUBA1C	HGNC:20768; Q9BQE3
17645	TUBA3C	HGNC:12408; P0DPH7
17646	TUBA3D	HGNC:24071; P0DPH8
17647	TUBA3E	HGNC:20765; Q6PEY2
17648	TUBA4A	HGNC:12407; P68366
17649	TUBA4B	HGNC:18637; Q9H853
17650	TUBA8	HGNC:12410; Q9NY65
17651	TUBAL3	HGNC:23534; A6NHL2
17652	TUBB	HGNC:20778; P07437
17653	TUBB1	HGNC:16257; Q9H4B7
17654	TUBB2A	HGNC:12412; Q13885
17655	TUBB2B	HGNC:30829; Q9BVA1
17656	TUBB3	HGNC:20772; Q13509
17657	TUBB4A	HGNC:20774; P04350
17658	TUBB4B	HGNC:20771; P68371
17659	TUBB6	HGNC:20776; Q9BUF5
17660	TUBB8	HGNC:20773; Q3ZCM7
17661	TUBB8B	HGNC:24983; A6NNZ2
17662	TUBD1	HGNC:16811; Q9UJT1
17663	TUBE1	HGNC:20775; Q9UJT0
17664	TUBG1	HGNC:12417; P23258
17665	TUBG2	HGNC:12419; Q9NRH3
17666	TUBGCP2	HGNC:18599; Q9BSJ2
17667	TUBGCP3	HGNC:18598; Q96CW5
17668	TUBGCP4	HGNC:16691; Q9UGJ1
17669	TUBGCP5	HGNC:18600; Q96RT8
17670	TUBGCP6	HGNC:18127; Q96RT7
17671	TUFM	HGNC:12420; P49411
17672	TUFT1	HGNC:12422; Q9NNX1
17673	TUG1	HGNC:26066; A0A6I8PU40
17674	TULP1	HGNC:12423; O00294
17675	TULP2	HGNC:12424; O00295
17676	TULP3	HGNC:12425; O75386
17677	TULP4	HGNC:15530; Q9NRJ4
17678	TUNAR	HGNC:44088; A0A1B0GTB2
17679	TUSC1	HGNC:31010; Q2TAM9
17680	TUSC2	HGNC:17034; O75896
17681	TUSC3	HGNC:30242; Q13454
17682	TUT1	HGNC:26184; Q9H6E5
17683	TUT4	HGNC:28981; Q5TAX3
17684	TUT7	HGNC:25817; Q5VYS8
17685	TVP23A	HGNC:20398; A6NH52
17686	TVP23B	HGNC:20399; Q9NYZ1
17687	TVP23C	HGNC:30453; Q96ET8
17688	TWF1	HGNC:9620; Q12792
17689	TWF2	HGNC:9621; Q6IBS0
17690	TWIST1	HGNC:12428; Q15672
17691	TWIST2	HGNC:20670; Q8WVJ9
17692	TWNK	HGNC:1160; Q96RR1
17693	TWSG1	HGNC:12429; Q9GZX9
17694	TXK	HGNC:12434; P42681
17695	TXLNA	HGNC:30685; P40222
17696	TXLNB	HGNC:21617; Q8N3L3
17697	TXLNG	HGNC:18578; Q9NUQ3
17698	TXN	HGNC:12435; P10599
17699	TXN2	HGNC:17772; Q99757
17700	TXNDC2	HGNC:16470; Q86VQ3
17701	TXNDC5	HGNC:21073; Q8NBS9
17702	TXNDC8	HGNC:31454; Q6A555
17703	TXNDC9	HGNC:24110; O14530
17704	TXNDC11	HGNC:28030; Q6PKC3
17705	TXNDC12	HGNC:24626; O95881
17706	TXNDC15	HGNC:20652; Q96J42
17707	TXNDC16	HGNC:19965; Q9P2K2
17708	TXNDC17	HGNC:28218; Q9BRA2
17709	TXNIP	HGNC:16952; Q9H3M7
17710	TXNL1	HGNC:12436; O43396
17711	TXNL4A	HGNC:30551; P83876
17712	TXNL4B	HGNC:26041; Q9NX01
17713	TXNRD1	HGNC:12437; Q16881
17714	TXNRD2	HGNC:18155; Q9NNW7
17715	TXNRD3	HGNC:20667; Q86VQ6
17716	TYK2	HGNC:12440; P29597
17717	TYMP	HGNC:3148; P19971
17718	TYMS	HGNC:12441; P04818
17719	TYR	HGNC:12442; P14679
17720	TYRO3	HGNC:12446; Q06418
17721	TYROBP	HGNC:12449; O43914
17722	TYRP1	HGNC:12450; P17643
17723	TYSND1	HGNC:28531; Q2T9J0
17724	TYW1	HGNC:25598; Q9NV66
17725	TYW1B	HGNC:33908; Q6NUM6
17726	TYW2	HGNC:26091; Q53H54
17727	TYW3	HGNC:24757; Q6IPR3
17728	TYW5	HGNC:26754; A2RUC4
17729	U2AF1	HGNC:12453; Q01081
17730	U2AF1L4	HGNC:23020; Q8WU68
17731	U2AF2	HGNC:23156; P26368
17732	U2SURP	HGNC:30855; O15042
17733	UACA	HGNC:15947; Q9BZF9
17734	UAP1	HGNC:12457; Q16222
17735	UAP1L1	HGNC:28082; Q3KQV9
17736	UBA1	HGNC:12469; P22314
17737	UBA2	HGNC:30661; Q9UBT2
17738	UBA3	HGNC:12470; Q8TBC4
17739	UBA5	HGNC:23230; Q9GZZ9
17740	UBA6	HGNC:25581; A0AVT1
17741	UBA7	HGNC:12471; P41226
17742	UBA52	HGNC:12458; P62987
17743	UBAC1	HGNC:30221; Q9BSL1
17744	UBAC2	HGNC:20486; Q8NBM4
17745	UBALD1	HGNC:29576; Q8TB05
17746	UBALD2	HGNC:28438; Q8IYN6
17747	UBAP1	HGNC:12461; Q9NZ09
17748	UBAP1L	HGNC:40028; F5GYI3
17749	UBAP2	HGNC:14185; Q5T6F2
17750	UBAP2L	HGNC:29877; Q14157
17751	UBASH3A	HGNC:12462; P57075
17752	UBASH3B	HGNC:29884; Q8TF42
17753	UBB	HGNC:12463; P0CG47
17754	UBC	HGNC:12468; P0CG48
17755	UBD	HGNC:18795; O15205
17756	UBE2A	HGNC:12472; P49459
17757	UBE2B	HGNC:12473; P63146
17758	UBE2C	HGNC:15937; O00762
17759	UBE2D1	HGNC:12474; P51668
17760	UBE2D2	HGNC:12475; P62837
17761	UBE2D3	HGNC:12476; P61077
17762	UBE2D4	HGNC:21647; Q9Y2X8
17763	UBE2E1	HGNC:12477; P51965
17764	UBE2E2	HGNC:12478; Q96LR5
17765	UBE2E3	HGNC:12479; Q969T4
17766	UBE2F	HGNC:12480; Q969M7
17767	UBE2G1	HGNC:12482; P62253
17768	UBE2G2	HGNC:12483; P60604
17769	UBE2H	HGNC:12484; P62256
17770	UBE2I	HGNC:12485; P63279
17771	UBE2J1	HGNC:17598; Q9Y385
17772	UBE2J2	HGNC:19268; Q8N2K1
17773	UBE2K	HGNC:4914; P61086
17774	UBE2L3	HGNC:12488; P68036
17775	UBE2L5	HGNC:13477; A0A1B0GUS4
17776	UBE2L6	HGNC:12490; O14933
17777	UBE2M	HGNC:12491; P61081
17778	UBE2N	HGNC:12492; P61088
17779	UBE2NL	HGNC:31710; Q5JXB2
17780	UBE2O	HGNC:29554
17781	UBE2Q1	HGNC:15698; Q7Z7E8
17782	UBE2Q2	HGNC:19248; Q8WVN8
17783	UBE2QL1	HGNC:37269; A1L167
17784	UBE2R2	HGNC:19907; Q712K3
17785	UBE2S	HGNC:17895; Q16763
17786	UBE2T	HGNC:25009; Q9NPD8
17787	UBE2U	HGNC:28559; Q5VVX9
17788	UBE2V1	HGNC:12494; Q13404
17789	UBE2V2	HGNC:12495; Q15819
17790	UBE2W	HGNC:25616; Q96B02
17791	UBE2Z	HGNC:25847; Q9H832
17792	UBE3A	HGNC:12496; Q05086
17793	UBE3B	HGNC:13478; Q7Z3V4
17794	UBE3C	HGNC:16803; Q15386
17795	UBE3D	HGNC:21381; Q7Z6J8
17796	UBE4A	HGNC:12499; Q14139
17797	UBE4B	HGNC:12500; O95155
17798	UBFD1	HGNC:30565; O14562
17799	UBIAD1	HGNC:30791; Q9Y5Z9
17800	UBL3	HGNC:12504; O95164
17801	UBL4A	HGNC:12505; P11441
17802	UBL4B	HGNC:32309; Q8N7F7
17803	UBL5	HGNC:13736; Q9BZL1
17804	UBL7	HGNC:28221; Q96S82
17805	UBLCP1	HGNC:28110; Q8WVY7
17806	UBN1	HGNC:12506; Q9NPG3
17807	UBN2	HGNC:21931; Q6ZU65
17808	UBOX5	HGNC:17777; O94941
17809	UBP1	HGNC:12507; Q9NZI7
17810	UBQLN1	HGNC:12508; Q9UMX0
17811	UBQLN2	HGNC:12509; Q9UHD9
17812	UBQLN3	HGNC:12510; Q9H347
17813	UBQLN4	HGNC:1237; Q9NRR5
17814	UBQLNL	HGNC:28294; Q8IYU4
17815	UBR1	HGNC:16808; Q8IWV7
17816	UBR2	HGNC:21289; Q8IWV8
17817	UBR3	HGNC:30467; Q6ZT12
17818	UBR4	HGNC:30313; Q5T4S7
17819	UBR5	HGNC:16806; O95071
17820	UBR7	HGNC:20344; Q8N806
17821	UBTD1	HGNC:25683; Q9HAC8
17822	UBTD2	HGNC:24463; Q8WUN7
17823	UBTF	HGNC:12511; P17480
17824	UBTFL1	HGNC:14533; P0CB47
17825	UBXN1	HGNC:18402; Q04323
17826	UBXN2A	HGNC:27265; P68543
17827	UBXN2B	HGNC:27035; Q14CS0
17828	UBXN4	HGNC:14860; Q92575
17829	UBXN6	HGNC:14928; Q9BZV1
17830	UBXN7	HGNC:29119; O94888
17831	UBXN8	HGNC:30307; O00124
17832	UBXN10	HGNC:26354; Q96LJ8
17833	UBXN11	HGNC:30600; Q5T124
17834	UCHL1	HGNC:12513; P09936
17835	UCHL3	HGNC:12515; P15374
17836	UCHL5	HGNC:19678; Q9Y5K5
17837	UCK1	HGNC:14859; Q9HA47
17838	UCK2	HGNC:12562; Q9BZX2
17839	UCKL1	HGNC:15938; Q9NWZ5
17840	UCMA	HGNC:25205; Q8WVF2
17841	UCN	HGNC:12516; P55089
17842	UCN2	HGNC:18414; Q96RP3
17843	UCN3	HGNC:17781; Q969E3
17844	UCP1	HGNC:12517; P25874
17845	UCP2	HGNC:12518; P55851
17846	UCP3	HGNC:12519; P55916
17847	UEVLD	HGNC:30866; Q8IX04
17848	UFC1	HGNC:26941; Q9Y3C8
17849	UFD1	HGNC:12520; Q92890
17850	UFL1	HGNC:23039; O94874
17851	UFM1	HGNC:20597; P61960
17852	UFSP1	HGNC:33821; Q6NVU6
17853	UFSP2	HGNC:25640; Q9NUQ7
17854	UGCG	HGNC:12524; Q16739
17855	UGDH	HGNC:12525; O60701
17856	UGGT1	HGNC:15663; Q9NYU2
17857	UGGT2	HGNC:15664; Q9NYU1
17858	UGP2	HGNC:12527; Q16851
17859	UGT1A	HGNC:12529
17860	UGT2A1	HGNC:12542; P0DTE4
17861	UGT2A3	HGNC:28528; Q6UWM9
17862	UGT2B4	HGNC:12553; P06133
17863	UGT2B7	HGNC:12554; P16662
17864	UGT2B10	HGNC:12544; P36537
17865	UGT2B11	HGNC:12545; O75310
17866	UGT2B15	HGNC:12546; P54855
17867	UGT2B17	HGNC:12547; O75795
17868	UGT2B28	HGNC:13479; Q9BY64
17869	UGT3A1	HGNC:26625; Q6NUS8
17870	UGT3A2	HGNC:27266; Q3SY77
17871	UGT8	HGNC:12555; Q16880
17872	UHMK1	HGNC:19683; Q8TAS1
17873	UHRF1	HGNC:12556; Q96T88
17874	UHRF2	HGNC:12557; Q96PU4
17875	UIMC1	HGNC:30298; Q96RL1
17876	ULBP1	HGNC:14893; Q9BZM6
17877	ULBP2	HGNC:14894; Q9BZM5
17878	ULBP3	HGNC:14895; Q9BZM4
17879	ULK1	HGNC:12558; O75385
17880	ULK2	HGNC:13480; Q8IYT8
17881	ULK3	HGNC:19703; Q6PHR2
17882	ULK4	HGNC:15784; Q96C45
17883	UMAD1	HGNC:48955; C9J7I0
17884	UMOD	HGNC:12559; P07911
17885	UMODL1	HGNC:12560; Q5DID0
17886	UMPS	HGNC:12563; P11172
17887	UNC5A	HGNC:12567; Q6ZN44
17888	UNC5B	HGNC:12568; Q8IZJ1
17889	UNC5C	HGNC:12569; O95185
17890	UNC5CL	HGNC:21203; Q8IV45
17891	UNC5D	HGNC:18634; Q6UXZ4
17892	UNC13A	HGNC:23150; Q9UPW8
17893	UNC13B	HGNC:12566; O14795
17894	UNC13C	HGNC:23149; Q8NB66
17895	UNC13D	HGNC:23147; Q70J99
17896	UNC45A	HGNC:30594; Q9H3U1
17897	UNC45B	HGNC:14304; Q8IWX7
17898	UNC50	HGNC:16046; Q53HI1
17899	UNC79	HGNC:19966; Q9P2D8
17900	UNC80	HGNC:26582; Q8N2C7
17901	UNC93A	HGNC:12570; Q86WB7
17902	UNC93B1	HGNC:13481; Q9H1C4
17903	UNC119	HGNC:12565; Q13432
17904	UNC119B	HGNC:16488; A6NIH7
17905	UNCX	HGNC:33194; A6NJT0
17906	UNG	HGNC:12572; P13051
17907	UNK	HGNC:29369; Q9C0B0
17908	UNKL	HGNC:14184; Q9H9P5
17909	UPB1	HGNC:16297; Q9UBR1
17910	UPF1	HGNC:9962; Q92900
17911	UPF2	HGNC:17854; Q9HAU5
17912	UPF3A	HGNC:20332; Q9H1J1
17913	UPF3B	HGNC:20439; Q9BZI7
17914	UPK1A	HGNC:12577; O00322
17915	UPK1B	HGNC:12578; O75841
17916	UPK2	HGNC:12579; O00526
17917	UPK3A	HGNC:12580; O75631
17918	UPK3B	HGNC:21444; Q9BT76
17919	UPK3BL1	HGNC:37278; B0FP48
17920	UPK3BL2	HGNC:53444; E5RIL1
17921	UPP1	HGNC:12576; Q16831
17922	UPP2	HGNC:23061; O95045
17923	UPRT	HGNC:28334; Q96BW1
17924	UQCC1	HGNC:15891; Q9NVA1
17925	UQCC2	HGNC:21237; Q9BRT2
17926	UQCC3	HGNC:34399; Q6UW78
17927	UQCC4	HGNC:27558; Q4G0I0
17928	UQCC5	HGNC:37257; Q8WVI0
17929	UQCC6	HGNC:34450; Q69YU5
17930	UQCR10	HGNC:30863; Q9UDW1
17931	UQCR11	HGNC:30862; O14957
17932	UQCRB	HGNC:12582; P14927
17933	UQCRC1	HGNC:12585; P31930
17934	UQCRC2	HGNC:12586; P22695
17935	UQCRFS1	HGNC:12587; P47985
17936	UQCRH	HGNC:12590; P07919
17937	UQCRHL	HGNC:51714; A0A096LP55
17938	UQCRQ	HGNC:29594; O14949
17939	URAD	HGNC:17785; A6NGE7
17940	URB1	HGNC:17344; O60287
17941	URB2	HGNC:28967; Q14146
17942	URGCP	HGNC:30890; Q8TCY9
17943	URI1	HGNC:13236; O94763
17944	URM1	HGNC:28378; Q9BTM9
17945	UROC1	HGNC:26444; Q96N76
17946	UROD	HGNC:12591; P06132
17947	UROS	HGNC:12592; P10746
17948	USB1	HGNC:25792; Q9BQ65
17949	USE1	HGNC:30882; Q9NZ43
17950	USF1	HGNC:12593; P22415
17951	USF2	HGNC:12594; Q15853
17952	USF3	HGNC:30494; Q68DE3
17953	USH1C	HGNC:12597; Q9Y6N9
17954	USH1G	HGNC:16356; Q495M9
17955	USH2A	HGNC:12601; O75445
17956	USHBP1	HGNC:24058; Q8N6Y0
17957	USO1	HGNC:30904; O60763
17958	USP1	HGNC:12607; O94782
17959	USP2	HGNC:12618; O75604
17960	USP3	HGNC:12626; Q9Y6I4
17961	USP4	HGNC:12627; Q13107
17962	USP5	HGNC:12628; P45974
17963	USP6	HGNC:12629; P35125
17964	USP6NL	HGNC:16858; Q92738
17965	USP7	HGNC:12630; Q93009
17966	USP8	HGNC:12631; P40818
17967	USP9X	HGNC:12632; Q93008
17968	USP9Y	HGNC:12633; O00507
17969	USP10	HGNC:12608; Q14694
17970	USP11	HGNC:12609; P51784
17971	USP12	HGNC:20485; O75317
17972	USP13	HGNC:12611; Q92995
17973	USP14	HGNC:12612; P54578
17974	USP15	HGNC:12613; Q9Y4E8
17975	USP16	HGNC:12614; Q9Y5T5
17976	USP17L1	HGNC:37182; Q7RTZ2
17977	USP17L2	HGNC:34434; Q6R6M4
17978	USP17L3	HGNC:37175; A6NCW0
17979	USP17L4	HGNC:37176; A6NCW7
17980	USP17L5	HGNC:37177; A8MUK1
17981	USP17L7	HGNC:37180; P0C7H9
17982	USP17L8	HGNC:37181; P0C7I0
17983	USP17L10	HGNC:44438; C9JJH3
17984	USP17L11	HGNC:44439; C9JVI0
17985	USP17L12	HGNC:44440; C9JPN9
17986	USP17L13	HGNC:44441; C9JLJ4
17987	USP17L15	HGNC:44443; C9J2P7
17988	USP17L17	HGNC:44445; D6RBQ6
17989	USP17L18	HGNC:44446; D6R9N7
17990	USP17L19	HGNC:44447; D6RCP7
17991	USP17L20	HGNC:44448; D6RJB6
17992	USP17L21	HGNC:44449; D6R901
17993	USP17L22	HGNC:44450; D6RA61
17994	USP17L23	HGNC:44451; D6RBM5
17995	USP17L24	HGNC:44453; Q0WX57
17996	USP17L25	HGNC:44452; Q0WX57
17997	USP17L26	HGNC:44454; Q0WX57
17998	USP17L27	HGNC:44455; Q0WX57
17999	USP17L28	HGNC:44456; Q0WX57
18000	USP17L29	HGNC:44457; Q0WX57
