= UBASH3B =

Protein-coding gene in the species Homo sapiens

An Error has occurred retrieving Wikidata item for infobox Ubiquitin-associated and SH3 domain-containing protein B is a protein that in humans is encoded by the UBASH3B gene.

This gene encodes a protein that contains a ubiquitin associated protein domain at the N-terminus, an SH3 domain, and a C-terminal domain with similarities to the catalytic motif of phosphoglycerate mutase. The encoded protein was found to inhibit endocytosis of epidermal growth factor receptor (EGFR) and platelet-derived growth factor receptor.
