= Tubulin polymerization promoting protein family member 3 =

Protein-coding gene in the species Homo sapiens

TPPP3

Identifiers
- Aliases: TPPP3, TPPP/p20, p20, p25gamma, CGI-38, tubulin polymerization promoting protein family member 3
- External IDs: OMIM: 616957; MGI: 1915221; GeneCards: TPPP3
Available structures
PDB	Ortholog search: PDBe RCSB
PDB	List of PDB id codes 2JRF

Gene location (Human)
Chr.	Chromosome 16 (human)
Band	16q22.1	Start	67,389,809 bp
Band	16q22.1	End	67,393,518 bp

Gene location (Mouse)
Chr.	Chromosome 8 (mouse)
Band	8|8 D3	Start	106,194,125 bp
Band	8|8 D3	End	106,198,158 bp
RNA expression pattern
Bgee	Human / Mouse (ortholog); Top expressed in: right uterine tube; C1 segment; hypothalamus; olfactory zone of nasal mucosa; corpus callosum; substantia nigra; amygdala; hippocampus proper; putamen; skin of leg / Top expressed in: facial motor nucleus; right lung lobe; esophagus; lip; anterior horn of spinal cord; carotid body; sciatic nerve; ventromedial nucleus; optic nerve; trachea; More reference expression data
BioGPS	n/a
Gene ontology
Molecular function	tubulin binding
Cellular component	cytoplasm; microtubule; cytoskeleton; perinuclear region of cytoplasm; microtubule bundle
Biological process	microtubule polymerization; microtubule bundle formation; positive regulation of protein polymerization
Sources:Amigo / QuickGO
Orthologs
Databases	NCBI: entry; OMA: entry
Species	Human	Mouse
Entrez	51673	67971
Ensembl	ENSG00000159713	ENSMUSG00000014846
UniProt	Q9BW30	Q9CRB6
RefSeq (mRNA)	NM_016140; NM_015964	NM_026481
RefSeq (protein)	NP_057048; NP_057224	NP_080757
Location (UCSC)	Chr 16: 67.39 – 67.39 Mb	Chr 8: 106.19 – 106.2 Mb
PubMed search
- Wikidata
View/Edit Human	View/Edit Mouse

Tubulin polymerization promoting protein family member 3 is a protein that in humans is encoded by the TPPP3 gene.
