= Transmembrane protein 150B =

Protein found in humans

TMEM150B

Identifiers
- Aliases: TMEM150B, TMEM224, transmembrane protein 150B, TTN2, DRAM3
- External IDs: OMIM: 617291; MGI: 2679718; GeneCards: TMEM150B

Gene location (Human)
Chr.	Chromosome 19 (human)
Band	19q13.42	Start	55,312,801 bp
Band	19q13.42	End	55,334,048 bp

Gene location (Mouse)
Chr.	Chromosome 7 (mouse)
Band	7|7 A1	Start	4,709,831 bp
Band	7|7 A1	End	4,728,248 bp
RNA expression pattern
Bgee	Human / Mouse (ortholog); Top expressed in: monocyte; granulocyte; mucosa of transverse colon; upper lobe of left lung; duodenum; right lung; rectum; appendix; spleen; blood / Top expressed in: intestinal villus; duodenum; jejunum; ileum; fetal liver hematopoietic progenitor cell; dentate gyrus of hippocampal formation granule cell; neural layer of retina; colon; granulocyte; stomach; More reference expression data
BioGPS	n/a
Orthologs
Databases	NCBI: entry; OMA: entry
Species	Human	Mouse
Entrez	284417	330460
Ensembl	ENSG00000180061	ENSMUSG00000046456
UniProt	A6NC51; K7EKL2	Q8R218
RefSeq (mRNA)	NM_001085488; NM_001282011	NM_001142792; NM_177887
RefSeq (protein)	NP_001078957; NP_001268940	NP_001136264; NP_808555
Location (UCSC)	Chr 19: 55.31 – 55.33 Mb	Chr 7: 4.71 – 4.73 Mb
PubMed search
- Wikidata
View/Edit Human	View/Edit Mouse

Transmembrane protein 150B is a protein that in humans is encoded by the TMEM150B gene.

== Function ==
The protein belongs to the DRAM (damage-regulated autophagy modulator) family of membrane-spanning proteins. Alternate splicing results in multiple transcript variants. [provided by RefSeq, Aug 2013].
