= TINAG =

Protein-coding gene in the species Homo sapiens

Identifiers
- Aliases: TINAG, TIN-AG, tubulointerstitial nephritis antigen
- External IDs: OMIM: 606749; MGI: 1349477; HomoloGene: 8082; GeneCards: TINAG; OMA:TINAG - orthologs

Gene location (Human)
Chr.	Chromosome 6 (human)
Band	6p12.1	Start	54,307,859 bp
Band	6p12.1	End	54,390,142 bp

Gene location (Mouse)
Chr.	Chromosome 9 (mouse)
Band	9|9 D	Start	76,858,975 bp
Band	9|9 D	End	76,953,076 bp
RNA expression pattern
Bgee	Human / Mouse (ortholog); Top expressed in: mucosa of ileum; human kidney; rectum; mucosa of transverse colon; jejunal mucosa; mucosa of sigmoid colon; testicle; duodenum; renal cortex; gallbladder / Top expressed in: human kidney; right kidney; Paneth cell; left lung lobe; efferent ductule; left colon; ileum; intestinal villus; jejunum; duodenum; More reference expression data
BioGPS	n/a
Gene ontology
Molecular function	scavenger receptor activity; nucleotide binding; cysteine-type endopeptidase activity; polysaccharide binding; cysteine-type peptidase activity
Cellular component	basement membrane; extracellular region; lysosome; extracellular space
Biological process	cell adhesion; proteolysis involved in cellular protein catabolic process; receptor-mediated endocytosis; immune response; proteolysis; vesicle-mediated transport; endocytosis
Sources:Amigo / QuickGO
Orthologs
Species	Human	Mouse
Entrez	27283	26944
Ensembl	ENSG00000137251	ENSMUSG00000032357
UniProt	Q9UJW2	n/a
RefSeq (mRNA)	NM_014464	NM_012033
RefSeq (protein)	NP_055279	n/a
Location (UCSC)	Chr 6: 54.31 – 54.39 Mb	Chr 9: 76.86 – 76.95 Mb
PubMed search
- Wikidata
View/Edit Human	View/Edit Mouse

Tubulointerstitial nephritis antigen is a protein that in humans is encoded by the TINAG gene.

TINAG is a basement membrane glycoprotein initially identified as a target of antibodies in some forms of immunologically mediated tubulointerstitial nephritis.[supplied by OMIM]
