= TTPA =

TTPA may refer to:

== Biology ==
- Alpha-tocopherol transfer protein, a protein encoded by the gene TTPA

== Law ==
- Transparency and Targeting of Political Advertising, a European Union regulation adopted in March 2024
