= TPK1 =

Protein-coding gene in the species Homo sapiens

Identifiers
- Aliases: TPK1, HPP20, THMD5, thiamin pyrophosphokinase 1
- External IDs: OMIM: 606370; MGI: 1352500; GeneCards: TPK1
Available structures
PDB	Ortholog search: PDBe RCSB
PDB	List of PDB id codes 3S4Y

Gene location (Human)
Chr.	Chromosome 7 (human)
Band	7q35	Start	144,451,941 bp
Band	7q35	End	144,836,395 bp

Gene location (Mouse)
Chr.	Chromosome 6 (mouse)
Band	6|6 B2.1	Start	43,321,935 bp
Band	6|6 B2.1	End	43,643,212 bp
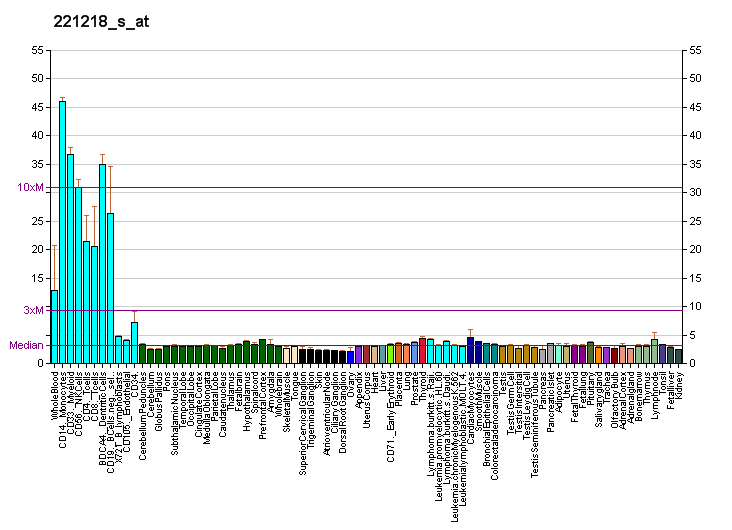
RNA expression pattern
Bgee	Human / Mouse (ortholog); Top expressed in: secondary oocyte; jejunal mucosa; monocyte; duodenum; Achilles tendon; blood; gonad; endothelial cell; testicle; granulocyte / Top expressed in: right kidney; proximal tubule; epithelium of stomach; human kidney; pyloric antrum; ileum; duodenum; jejunum; mucous cell of stomach; genital tubercle; More reference expression data
BioGPS	More reference expression data
Gene ontology
Molecular function	thiamine diphosphokinase activity; transferase activity; thiamine binding; nucleotide binding; ATP binding; kinase activity
Cellular component	cytosol
Biological process	thiamine metabolic process; thiamine diphosphate biosynthetic process; phosphorylation; thiamine-containing compound metabolic process
Sources:Amigo / QuickGO
Orthologs
Databases	NCBI: entry; OMA: entry
Species	Human	Mouse
Entrez	27010	29807
Ensembl	ENSG00000196511	ENSMUSG00000029735
UniProt	Q9H3S4	Q9R0M5
RefSeq (mRNA)	NM_001042482; NM_022445; NM_001350879; NM_001350880; NM_001350881 NM_001350882; NM_001350883; NM_001350884; NM_001350885; NM_001350886; NM_001350887; NM_001350889; NM_001350893; NM_001350894; NM_001350895	NM_013861; NM_001311111
RefSeq (protein)	NP_001035947; NP_071890; NP_001337808; NP_001337809; NP_001337810 NP_001337811; NP_001337812; NP_001337813; NP_001337814; NP_001337815; NP_001337816; NP_001337818; NP_001337822; NP_001337823; NP_001337824	NP_001298040; NP_038889
Location (UCSC)	Chr 7: 144.45 – 144.84 Mb	Chr 6: 43.32 – 43.64 Mb
PubMed search
- Wikidata
View/Edit Human	View/Edit Mouse

Thiamin pyrophosphokinase 1 is an enzyme that in humans is encoded by the TPK1 gene.

This gene encodes a protein, that exists as a homodimer, which catalyzes the conversion of thiamine to thiamine pyrophosphate. Alternate transcriptional splice variants, encoding different isoforms, have been characterized.
