= TMEM184B =

Protein-coding gene in the species Homo sapiens

Identifiers
- Aliases: TMEM184B, C22orf5, FM08, HS5O6A, HSPC256, transmembrane protein 184B
- External IDs: MGI: 2445179; GeneCards: TMEM184B

Gene location (Human)
Chr.	Chromosome 22 (human)
Band	22q13.1	Start	38,219,291 bp
Band	22q13.1	End	38,273,010 bp

Gene location (Mouse)
Chr.	Chromosome 15 (mouse)
Band	15|15 E1	Start	79,244,884 bp
Band	15|15 E1	End	79,287,769 bp
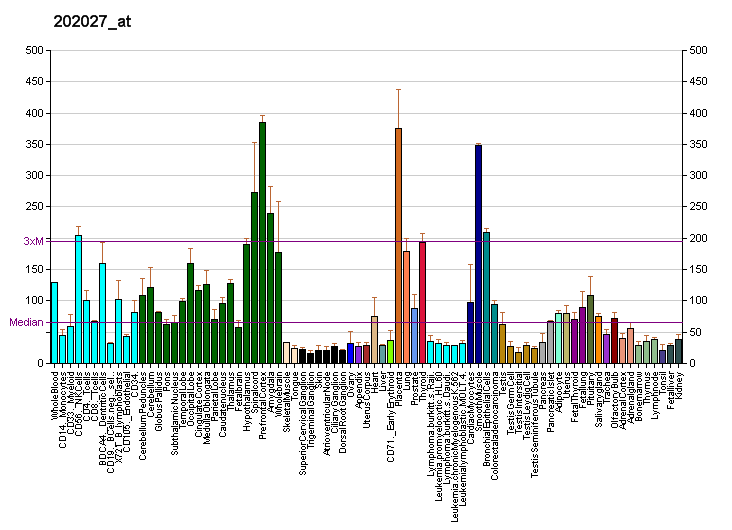
RNA expression pattern
Bgee	Human / Mouse (ortholog); Top expressed in: C1 segment; right frontal lobe; stromal cell of endometrium; inferior ganglion of vagus nerve; prefrontal cortex; cingulate gyrus; anterior cingulate cortex; right hemisphere of cerebellum; right lung; apex of heart / Top expressed in: interventricular septum; granulocyte; visual cortex; primary visual cortex; superior frontal gyrus; yolk sac; zygote; cerebellar cortex; muscle of thigh; molar; More reference expression data
BioGPS	More reference expression data
Gene ontology
Molecular function	transporter activity
Cellular component	membrane; integral component of membrane
Biological process	transport
Sources:Amigo / QuickGO
Orthologs
Databases	NCBI: entry; OMA: entry
Species	Human	Mouse
Entrez	25829	223693
Ensembl	ENSG00000198792	ENSMUSG00000009035
UniProt	Q9Y519	Q8BG09
RefSeq (mRNA)	NM_001195071; NM_001195072; NM_012264	NM_001253817; NM_001253819; NM_001253820; NM_172608; NM_001378998
RefSeq (protein)	NP_001182000; NP_001182001; NP_036396	NP_001240746; NP_001240748; NP_001240749; NP_766196; NP_001365927
Location (UCSC)	Chr 22: 38.22 – 38.27 Mb	Chr 15: 79.24 – 79.29 Mb
PubMed search
- Wikidata
View/Edit Human	View/Edit Mouse

Transmembrane protein 184B is a protein that in humans is encoded by the TMEM184B gene.
