= Trafficking protein particle complex 6A =

Protein-coding gene in the species Homo sapiens

TRAPPC6A

Identifiers
- Aliases: TRAPPC6A, TRS33, trafficking protein particle complex 6A, trafficking protein particle complex subunit 6A
- External IDs: OMIM: 610396; MGI: 1914341; GeneCards: TRAPPC6A
Available structures
PDB	Ortholog search: PDBe RCSB
PDB	List of PDB id codes 2C0J, 2J3T

Gene location (Human)
Chr.	Chromosome 19 (human)
Band	19q13.32	Start	45,162,928 bp
Band	19q13.32	End	45,178,237 bp
RNA expression pattern
Bgee	Human / Mouse (ortholog); Top expressed in: right uterine tube; granulocyte; skin of abdomen; C1 segment; skin of leg; right lobe of liver; mucosa of transverse colon; olfactory zone of nasal mucosa; left lobe of thyroid gland; spleen / n/a; More reference expression data
BioGPS	n/a
Gene ontology
Molecular function	protein binding
Cellular component	cytosol; Golgi apparatus; endoplasmic reticulum; Golgi membrane; cis-Golgi network; trans-Golgi network; TRAPP complex
Biological process	pigmentation; COPII vesicle coating; vesicle-mediated transport; endoplasmic reticulum to Golgi vesicle-mediated transport; melanosome assembly; regulation of GTPase activity; Golgi vesicle transport
Sources:Amigo / QuickGO
Orthologs
Databases	NCBI: entry; OMA: entry
Species	Human	Mouse
Entrez	79090	67091
Ensembl	ENSG00000007255	ENSMUSG00000002043
UniProt	O75865	Q78XR0
RefSeq (mRNA)	NM_024108; NM_001270891; NM_001270892; NM_001270893	NM_025960
RefSeq (protein)	NP_001257820; NP_001257821; NP_001257822; NP_077013; NP_001257820.1	NP_001318110; NP_080236
Location (UCSC)	Chr 19: 45.16 – 45.18 Mb	n/a
PubMed search
- Wikidata
View/Edit Human	View/Edit Mouse

Trafficking protein particle complex 6A is a protein that in humans is encoded by the TRAPPC6A gene.

== Function ==
This gene encodes a component of the trafficking protein particle complex, which tethers transport vesicles to the cis-Golgi membrane. Loss of expression of the related gene in mouse affects coat and eye pigmentation, suggesting that the encoded protein may be involved in melanosome biogenesis. Alternatively spliced transcript variants encoding multiple isoforms have been observed for this gene. [provided by RefSeq, Aug 2012].
