= TRMT13 =

Protein-coding gene in humans

Identifiers
- Aliases: TRMT13, CCDC76, tRNA methyltransferase 13 homolog
- External IDs: MGI: 1925219; GeneCards: TRMT13
Enzyme activity
EC #	BRENDA	ExPASy	KEGG	MetaCyc
2.1.1.225	↗	↗	↗	↗

Gene location (Human)
Chr.	Chromosome 1 (human)
Band	1p21.2	Start	100,133,150 bp
Band	1p21.2	End	100,150,496 bp

Gene location (Mouse)
Chr.	Chromosome 3 (mouse)
Band	3|3 G1	Start	116,374,742 bp
Band	3|3 G1	End	116,408,236 bp
RNA expression pattern
Bgee	Human / Mouse (ortholog); Top expressed in: secondary oocyte; Achilles tendon; corpus callosum; body of pancreas; right uterine tube; right ovary; left ovary; lymph node; rectum; sural nerve / Top expressed in: Rostral migratory stream; hand; zygote; genital tubercle; tail of embryo; neural layer of retina; secondary oocyte; Paneth cell; embryo; granulocyte; More reference expression data
BioGPS	n/a
Orthologs
Databases	NCBI: entry; OMA: entry
Species	Human	Mouse
Entrez	54482	229780
Ensembl	ENSG00000122435	ENSMUSG00000033439
UniProt	Q9NUP7	Q8BYH3
RefSeq (mRNA)	NM_019083; NM_001393409; NM_001393410; NM_001393411; NM_001393412 NM_001393413; NM_001393414	NM_030016
RefSeq (protein)	NP_061956	NP_084292
Location (UCSC)	Chr 1: 100.13 – 100.15 Mb	Chr 3: 116.37 – 116.41 Mb
PubMed search
- Wikidata
View/Edit Human	View/Edit Mouse

TRNA methyltransferase 13 homolog is a protein that in humans is encoded by the TRMT13 gene.
