= UEVLD =

Protein-coding gene in the species Homo sapiens

Available structures
PDB	Ortholog search: PDBe RCSB
PDB	List of PDB id codes 2I6T, 3DL2

Identifiers
- Aliases: UEVLD, ATTP, UEV3, UEV and lactate/malate dehyrogenase domains
- External IDs: OMIM: 610985; MGI: 1860490; HomoloGene: 69251; GeneCards: UEVLD; OMA:UEVLD - orthologs

Gene location (Human)
Chr.	Chromosome 11 (human)
Band	11p15.1	Start	18,529,609 bp
Band	11p15.1	End	18,588,747 bp

Gene location (Mouse)
Chr.	Chromosome 7 (mouse)
Band	7|7 B3	Start	46,572,964 bp
Band	7|7 B3	End	46,608,275 bp
RNA expression pattern
Bgee	Human / Mouse (ortholog); Top expressed in: mucosa of sigmoid colon; bronchial epithelial cell; mucosa of paranasal sinus; seminal vesicula; right ventricle; oral cavity; Achilles tendon; human penis; biceps brachii; buccal mucosa cell / Top expressed in: saccule; tail of embryo; ectoderm; otic vesicle; genital tubercle; otic placode; ventricular zone; cumulus cell; yolk sac; muscle of thigh; More reference expression data
BioGPS	n/a
Gene ontology
Molecular function	oxidoreductase activity, acting on the CH-OH group of donors, NAD or NADP as acceptor; oxidoreductase activity; catalytic activity; molecular function
Cellular component	extracellular exosome
Biological process	protein transport; carboxylic acid metabolic process; carbohydrate metabolic process; biological process
Sources:Amigo / QuickGO
Orthologs
Species	Human	Mouse
Entrez	55293	54122
Ensembl	ENSG00000151116	ENSMUSG00000043262
UniProt	Q8IX04	Q3U1V6
RefSeq (mRNA)	NM_001040697; NM_001040698; NM_001261382; NM_001261383; NM_001261384 NM_001261385; NM_001261386; NM_001297771; NM_018314	NM_001040695; NM_016855
RefSeq (protein)	NP_001035787; NP_001248311; NP_001248312; NP_001248313; NP_001248314 NP_001248315; NP_001284700; NP_060784	NP_001035785
Location (UCSC)	Chr 11: 18.53 – 18.59 Mb	Chr 7: 46.57 – 46.61 Mb
PubMed search
- Wikidata
View/Edit Human	View/Edit Mouse

UEV and lactate/malate dehyrogenase domains is a protein that in humans is encoded by the UEVLD gene.
