= TP53 target 3D =

Protein-coding gene in the species Homo sapiens

TP53TG3D

Identifiers
- Aliases: TP53TG3D, TP53TG3, TP53TG3B, TP53TG3C, TP53TG3E, TP53TG3F, TP53 target 3D
- External IDs: GeneCards: TP53TG3D

Gene location (Human)
Chr.	Chromosome 16 (human)
Band	16p11.2	Start	32,252,719 bp
Band	16p11.2	End	32,255,922 bp
RNA expression pattern
Bgee	Human / Mouse (ortholog); Top expressed in: testicle; right testis; left testis; gonad; cerebellum; cerebellar cortex; cerebellar hemisphere; right hemisphere of cerebellum; stromal cell of endometrium; placenta / n/a; More reference expression data
BioGPS	n/a
Orthologs
Databases	NCBI: entry; OMA: entry
Species	Human	Mouse
Entrez	729264	n/a
Ensembl	ENSG00000205456	n/a
UniProt	Q9ULZ0	n/a
RefSeq (mRNA)	NM_001243722	n/a
RefSeq (protein)	NP_057296; NP_001316990; NP_001230651; NP_001355160; NP_001093157 NP_001355166	n/a
Location (UCSC)	Chr 16: 32.25 – 32.26 Mb	n/a
PubMed search		n/a
- Wikidata
View/Edit Human

TP53 target 3D is a protein that in humans is encoded by the TP53TG3D gene.
