= TMPRSS11B =

Mammalian protein found in Homo sapiens

Identifiers
- Aliases: TMPRSS11B, transmembrane protease, serine 11B, transmembrane serine protease 11B, HATL5
- External IDs: GeneCards: TMPRSS11B

Gene location (Human)
Chr.	Chromosome 4 (human)
Band	4q13.2	Start	68,226,653 bp
Band	4q13.2	End	68,245,694 bp
RNA expression pattern
Bgee	Human / Mouse (ortholog); Top expressed in: mucosa of pharynx; oral cavity; body of tongue; gums; gingival epithelium; superior surface of tongue; amniotic fluid; vagina; sperm; buccal mucosa cell / n/a; More reference expression data
BioGPS	n/a
Gene ontology
Molecular function	peptidase activity; hydrolase activity; serine-type peptidase activity; serine-type endopeptidase activity
Cellular component	integral component of plasma membrane; membrane; extracellular region; extracellular exosome; integral component of membrane; plasma membrane
Biological process	proteolysis; biological process
Sources:Amigo / QuickGO
Orthologs
Databases	NCBI: entry; OMA: entry
Species	Human	Mouse
Entrez	132724	n/a
Ensembl	ENSG00000185873	n/a
UniProt	Q86T26	n/a
RefSeq (mRNA)	NM_182502	n/a
RefSeq (protein)	NP_872308	n/a
Location (UCSC)	Chr 4: 68.23 – 68.25 Mb	n/a
PubMed search		n/a
- Wikidata
View/Edit Human

Transmembrane protease, serine 11B is a protein that in humans is encoded by the TMPRSS11B gene.
