= Synaptogyrin 3 =

Protein-coding gene in the species Homo sapiens

SYNGR3

Identifiers
- Aliases: SYNGR3, synaptogyrin 3
- External IDs: OMIM: 603927; MGI: 1341881; GeneCards: SYNGR3

Gene location (Human)
Chr.	Chromosome 16 (human)
Band	16p13.3	Start	1,989,660 bp
Band	16p13.3	End	1,994,275 bp

Gene location (Mouse)
Chr.	Chromosome 17 (mouse)
Band	17|17 A3.3	Start	24,904,066 bp
Band	17|17 A3.3	End	24,908,929 bp
RNA expression pattern
Bgee	Human / Mouse (ortholog); Top expressed in: middle temporal gyrus; Brodmann area 23; superior frontal gyrus; Brodmann area 46; orbitofrontal cortex; pons; primary visual cortex; entorhinal cortex; dorsolateral prefrontal cortex; frontal pole / Top expressed in: primary visual cortex; superior frontal gyrus; dentate gyrus of hippocampal formation granule cell; central gray substance of midbrain; dorsomedial hypothalamic nucleus; nucleus of stria terminalis; ventral tegmental area; piriform cortex; medial dorsal nucleus; lateral hypothalamus; More reference expression data
BioGPS	n/a
Gene ontology
Molecular function	SH2 domain binding; protein N-terminus binding
Cellular component	cell junction; integral component of membrane; cytoplasmic vesicle; synapse; synaptic vesicle; membrane; neuromuscular junction; synaptic vesicle membrane
Biological process	substantia nigra development; positive regulation of transporter activity; regulated exocytosis
Sources:Amigo / QuickGO
Orthologs
Databases	NCBI: entry; OMA: entry
Species	Human	Mouse
Entrez	9143	20974
Ensembl	ENSG00000127561	ENSMUSG00000007021
UniProt	O43761	Q8R191
RefSeq (mRNA)	NM_004209	NM_011522
RefSeq (protein)	NP_004200	NP_035652
Location (UCSC)	Chr 16: 1.99 – 1.99 Mb	Chr 17: 24.9 – 24.91 Mb
PubMed search
- Wikidata
View/Edit Human	View/Edit Mouse

Synaptogyrin 3 is a protein that in humans is encoded by the SYNGR3 gene.

== Function ==
This gene encodes an integral membrane protein. The exact function of this protein is unclear, but studies of a similar murine protein suggest that it is a synaptic vesicle protein that also interacts with the dopamine transporter. The gene product belongs to the synaptogyrin gene family. [provided by RefSeq, Dec 2010].
