= UBE2G1 =

Protein-coding gene in the species Homo sapiens

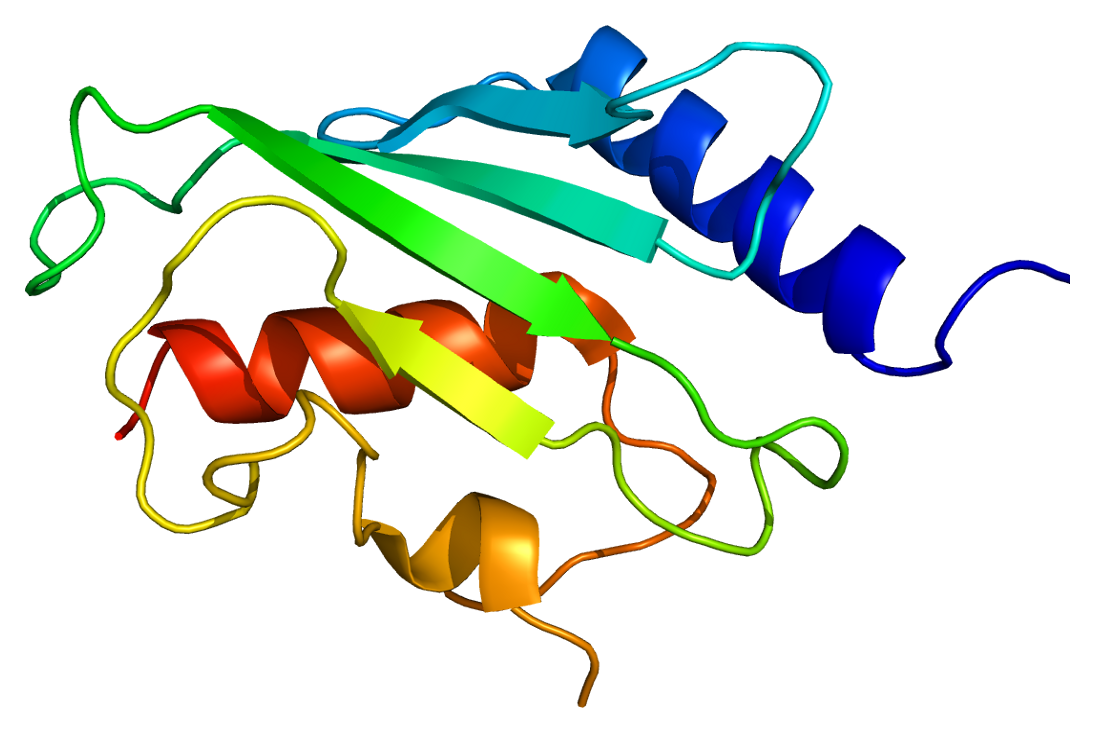

Identifiers
- Aliases: UBE2G1, E217K, UBC7, UBE2G, ubiquitin conjugating enzyme E2 G1
- External IDs: OMIM: 601569; MGI: 1914378; GeneCards: UBE2G1
Available structures
PDB	Ortholog search: PDBe RCSB
PDB	List of PDB id codes 2AWF
Enzyme activity
EC #	BRENDA	ExPASy	KEGG	MetaCyc
2.3.2.23	↗	↗	↗	↗

Gene location (Human)
Chr.	Chromosome 17 (human)
Band	17p13.2	Start	4,269,259 bp
Band	17p13.2	End	4,366,675 bp

Gene location (Mouse)
Chr.	Chromosome 11 (mouse)
Band	11|11 B4	Start	72,498,109 bp
Band	11|11 B4	End	72,577,307 bp
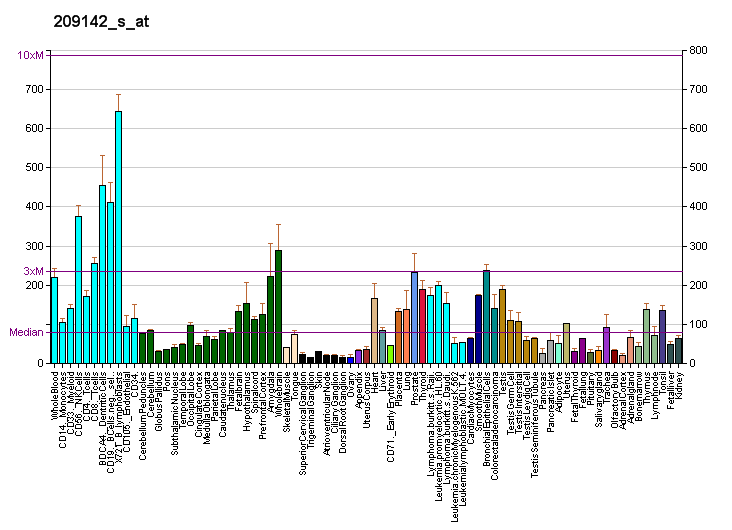

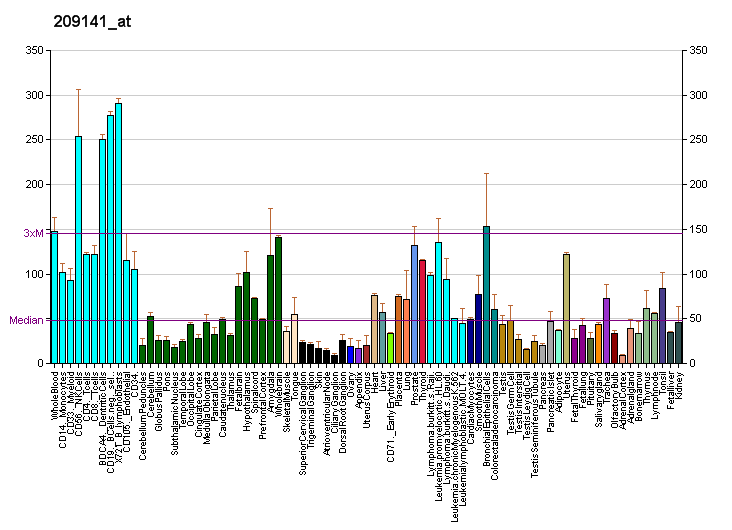
RNA expression pattern
Bgee	Human / Mouse (ortholog); Top expressed in: sperm; secondary oocyte; biceps brachii; vastus lateralis muscle; Skeletal muscle tissue of rectus abdominis; Skeletal muscle tissue of biceps brachii; glutes; deltoid muscle; muscle of thigh; tibialis anterior muscle / Top expressed in: primary oocyte; otic placode; otic vesicle; saccule; triceps brachii muscle; sternocleidomastoid muscle; extensor digitorum longus muscle; temporal muscle; medial ganglionic eminence; plantaris muscle; More reference expression data
BioGPS	More reference expression data
Gene ontology
Molecular function	transferase activity; nucleotide binding; ATP binding; ubiquitin conjugating enzyme activity; ubiquitin protein ligase binding; ubiquitin protein ligase activity; ubiquitin-protein transferase activity
Cellular component	cytoplasm; extracellular exosome; cytosol
Biological process	protein K63-linked ubiquitination; protein K48-linked ubiquitination; ubiquitin-dependent protein catabolic process; protein ubiquitination; protein polyubiquitination; proteasome-mediated ubiquitin-dependent protein catabolic process
Sources:Amigo / QuickGO
Orthologs
Databases	NCBI: entry; OMA: entry
Species	Human	Mouse
Entrez	7326	67128
Ensembl	ENSG00000132388	ENSMUSG00000020794
UniProt	P62253	P62254
RefSeq (mRNA)	NM_182682; NM_003342	NM_025985
RefSeq (protein)	NP_003333	NP_080261
Location (UCSC)	Chr 17: 4.27 – 4.37 Mb	Chr 11: 72.5 – 72.58 Mb
PubMed search
- Wikidata
View/Edit Human	View/Edit Mouse

Ubiquitin-conjugating enzyme E2 G1 is a protein that in humans is encoded by the UBE2G1 gene.

The modification of proteins with ubiquitin is an important cellular mechanism for targeting abnormal or short-lived proteins for degradation. Ubiquitination involves at least three classes of enzymes: ubiquitin-activating enzymes, or E1s, ubiquitin-conjugating enzymes, or E2s, and ubiquitin-protein ligases, or E3s. This gene encodes a member of the E2 ubiquitin-conjugating enzyme family and catalyzes the covalent attachment of ubiquitin to other proteins. The protein may be involved in degradation of muscle-specific proteins.
