= UBA7 =

Protein-coding gene in the species Homo sapiens

Identifiers
- Aliases: UBA7, D8, UBA1B, UBE1L, UBE2, ubiquitin like modifier activating enzyme 7, UBE7
- External IDs: OMIM: 191325; MGI: 1349462; GeneCards: UBA7

Gene location (Human)
Chr.	Chromosome 3 (human)
Band	3p21.31	Start	49,805,209 bp
Band	3p21.31	End	49,813,953 bp

Gene location (Mouse)
Chr.	Chromosome 9 (mouse)
Band	9 F1|9 59.07 cM	Start	107,852,704 bp
Band	9 F1|9 59.07 cM	End	107,861,259 bp
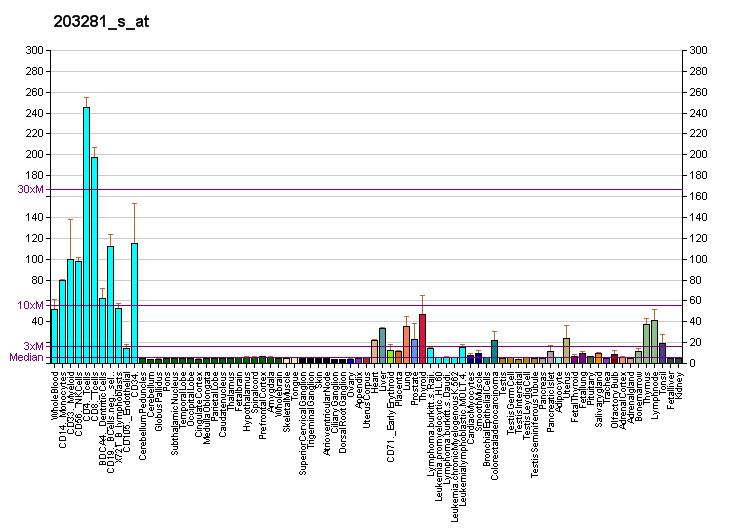

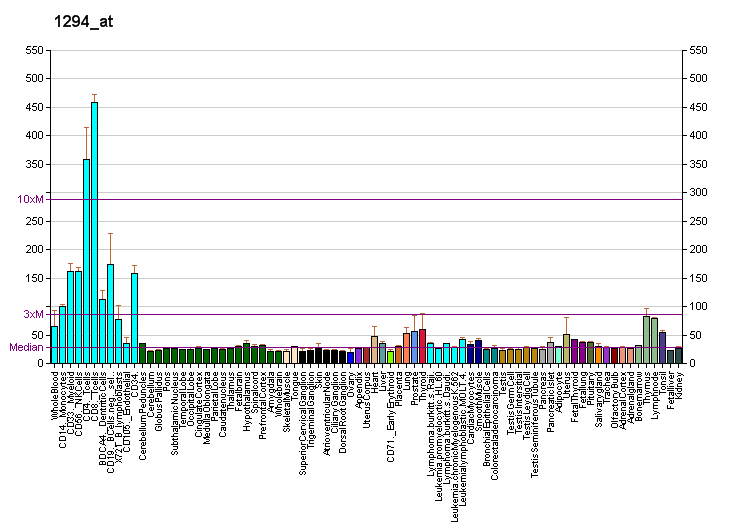
RNA expression pattern
Bgee	Human / Mouse (ortholog); Top expressed in: granulocyte; spleen; right uterine tube; lymph node; appendix; duodenum; gallbladder; right ovary; left ovary; right lobe of thyroid gland / Top expressed in: granulocyte; spleen; blood; duodenum; thymus; mesenteric lymph nodes; submandibular gland; jejunum; intestinal villus; ileum; More reference expression data
BioGPS	More reference expression data
Gene ontology
Molecular function	ATP binding; ISG15 activating enzyme activity; nucleotide binding; ubiquitin-like modifier activating enzyme activity; ligase activity; protein binding; ubiquitin-protein transferase activity; ubiquitin activating enzyme activity
Cellular component	nucleoplasm; cytosol; cytoplasm; nucleus
Biological process	negative regulation of type I interferon production; ISG15-protein conjugation; protein ubiquitination; modification-dependent protein catabolic process; ubiquitin-dependent protein catabolic process; cellular response to DNA damage stimulus; protein modification by small protein conjugation
Sources:Amigo / QuickGO
Orthologs
Databases	NCBI: entry; OMA: entry
Species	Human	Mouse
Entrez	7318	74153
Ensembl	ENSG00000182179	ENSMUSG00000032596
UniProt	P41226	n/a
RefSeq (mRNA)	NM_003335	NM_023738
RefSeq (protein)	NP_003326	n/a
Location (UCSC)	Chr 3: 49.81 – 49.81 Mb	Chr 9: 107.85 – 107.86 Mb
PubMed search
- Wikidata
View/Edit Human	View/Edit Mouse

Ubiquitin-like modifier-activating enzyme 7 is a protein that in humans is encoded by the UBA7 gene.

The modification of proteins with ubiquitin is an important cellular mechanism for targeting abnormal or short-lived proteins for degradation. Ubiquitination involves at least three classes of enzymes: ubiquitin-activating enzymes, or E1s, ubiquitin-conjugating enzymes, or E2s, and ubiquitin-protein ligases, or E3s. This gene encodes a member of the E1 ubiquitin-activating enzyme family. The encoded enzyme is a retinoid target that triggers promyelocytic leukemia (PML)/retinoic acid receptor alpha (RARalpha) degradation and apoptosis in acute promyelocytic leukemia.
