= UBE2C =

Protein-coding gene in the species Homo sapiens

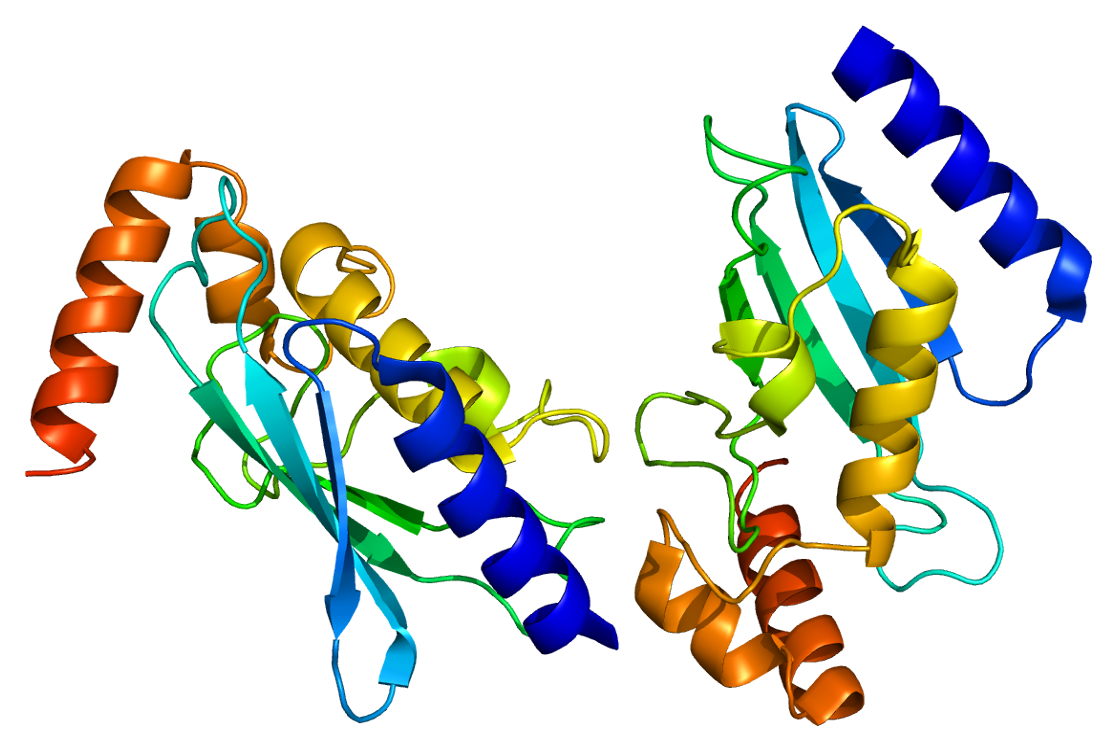

Identifiers
- Aliases: UBE2C, UBCH10, dJ447F3.2, ubiquitin conjugating enzyme E2 C
- External IDs: OMIM: 605574; MGI: 1915862; GeneCards: UBE2C
Available structures
PDB	Ortholog search: PDBe RCSB
PDB	List of PDB id codes 1I7K, 4YII, 5A31
Enzyme activity
EC #	BRENDA	ExPASy	KEGG	MetaCyc
2.3.2.23	↗	↗	↗	↗
2.3.2.24	↗	↗	↗	↗

Gene location (Human)
Chr.	Chromosome 20 (human)
Band	20q13.12	Start	45,812,576 bp
Band	20q13.12	End	45,816,957 bp

Gene location (Mouse)
Chr.	Chromosome 2 (mouse)
Band	2 H3|2 85.27 cM	Start	164,611,818 bp
Band	2 H3|2 85.27 cM	End	164,620,742 bp
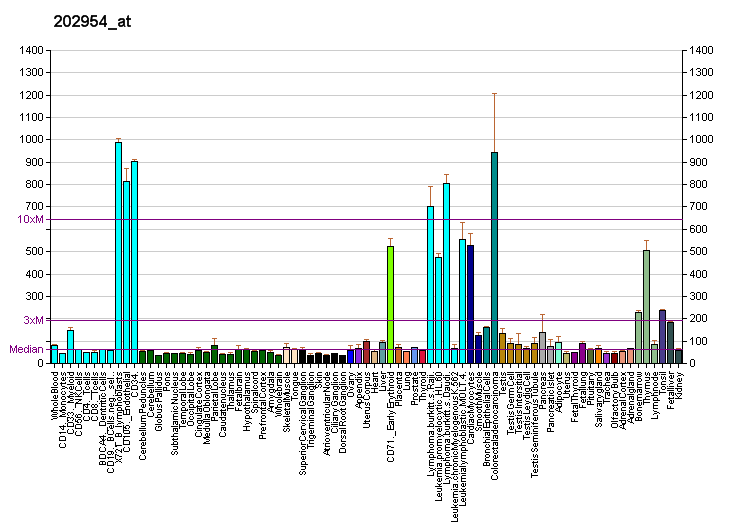
RNA expression pattern
Bgee	Human / Mouse (ortholog); Top expressed in: ventricular zone; embryo; ganglionic eminence; oocyte; mucosa of transverse colon; gonad; bone marrow; secondary oocyte; thymus; trabecular bone / Top expressed in: fetal liver hematopoietic progenitor cell; tail of embryo; zygote; genital tubercle; medial ganglionic eminence; ventricular zone; somite; otic placode; abdominal wall; morula; More reference expression data
BioGPS	More reference expression data
Gene ontology
Molecular function	transferase activity; nucleotide binding; ubiquitin protein ligase activity; ubiquitin-protein transferase activity; protein binding; ATP binding; ubiquitin conjugating enzyme activity; ubiquitin protein ligase binding; ubiquitin-like protein ligase binding
Cellular component	cytoplasm; nucleoplasm; anaphase-promoting complex; cytosol; plasma membrane; ubiquitin ligase complex; nucleus
Biological process	free ubiquitin chain polymerization; ubiquitin-dependent protein catabolic process; exit from mitosis; positive regulation of exit from mitosis; protein K11-linked ubiquitination; cell division; protein K48-linked ubiquitination; regulation of mitotic metaphase/anaphase transition; cell cycle; anaphase-promoting complex-dependent catabolic process; positive regulation of ubiquitin protein ligase activity; protein ubiquitination; regulation of mitotic cell cycle phase transition
Sources:Amigo / QuickGO
Orthologs
Databases	NCBI: entry; OMA: entry
Species	Human	Mouse
Entrez	11065	68612
Ensembl	ENSG00000175063	ENSMUSG00000001403
UniProt	O00762; Q5TZN3	Q9D1C1
RefSeq (mRNA)	NM_001281741; NM_001281742; NM_007019; NM_181799; NM_181800 NM_181801; NM_181802; NM_181803	NM_026785
RefSeq (protein)	NP_001268670; NP_001268671; NP_008950; NP_861515; NP_861516 NP_861517; NP_008950.1	NP_081061
Location (UCSC)	Chr 20: 45.81 – 45.82 Mb	Chr 2: 164.61 – 164.62 Mb
PubMed search
- Wikidata
View/Edit Human	View/Edit Mouse

Ubiquitin-conjugating enzyme E2 C is a protein that in humans is encoded by the UBE2C gene.

The modification of proteins with ubiquitin is an important cellular mechanism for targeting abnormal or short-lived proteins for degradation. Ubiquitination involves at least three classes of enzymes: ubiquitin-activating enzymes, or E1s, ubiquitin-conjugating enzymes, or E2s, and ubiquitin-protein ligases, or E3s. This gene encodes a member of the E2 ubiquitin-conjugating enzyme family. This enzyme is required for the destruction of mitotic cyclins and for cell cycle progression. Multiple alternatively spliced transcript variants have been found for this gene, but the full-length nature of some variants has not been defined.
