= UBE2Z =

Protein-coding gene in the species Homo sapiens

Identifiers
- Aliases: UBE2Z, USE1, HOYS7, ubiquitin conjugating enzyme E2 Z
- External IDs: OMIM: 611362; MGI: 1343160; GeneCards: UBE2Z
Available structures
PDB	Ortholog search: PDBe RCSB
PDB	List of PDB id codes 5A4P
Enzyme activity
EC #	BRENDA	ExPASy	KEGG	MetaCyc
2.3.2.23	↗	↗	↗	↗

Gene location (Human)
Chr.	Chromosome 17 (human)
Band	17q21.32	Start	48,908,407 bp
Band	17q21.32	End	48,929,056 bp

Gene location (Mouse)
Chr.	Chromosome 11 (mouse)
Band	11 D|11 59.28 cM	Start	95,938,258 bp
Band	11 D|11 59.28 cM	End	95,956,214 bp
RNA expression pattern
Bgee	Human / Mouse (ortholog); Top expressed in: islet of Langerhans; stromal cell of endometrium; cartilage tissue; corpus epididymis; mucosa of ileum; smooth muscle tissue; beta cell; granulocyte; nipple; lymph node / Top expressed in: choroid plexus of fourth ventricle; corneal stroma; saccule; ectoderm; otic placode; otic vesicle; Gonadal ridge; somite; endocardial cushion; lactiferous gland; More reference expression data
BioGPS	n/a
Gene ontology
Molecular function	transferase activity; nucleotide binding; protein binding; ATP binding; ubiquitin conjugating enzyme activity; ubiquitin protein ligase binding; ubiquitin protein ligase activity; cysteine-type endopeptidase inhibitor activity
Cellular component	nucleoplasm; cytoplasm; cytosol; nucleus
Biological process	apoptotic process; protein ubiquitination; positive regulation of apoptotic process; ubiquitin-dependent protein catabolic process; negative regulation of endopeptidase activity; negative regulation of apoptotic process
Sources:Amigo / QuickGO
Orthologs
Databases	NCBI: entry; OMA: entry
Species	Human	Mouse
Entrez	65264	268470
Ensembl	ENSG00000159202	ENSMUSG00000014349
UniProt	Q9H832	Q3UE37
RefSeq (mRNA)	NM_023079	NM_172300
RefSeq (protein)	NP_075567	NP_758504
Location (UCSC)	Chr 17: 48.91 – 48.93 Mb	Chr 11: 95.94 – 95.96 Mb
PubMed search
- Wikidata
View/Edit Human	View/Edit Mouse

Ubiquitin conjugating enzyme E2 Z (UBE2Z), also known as UBA6-specific E2 enzyme 1 (USE1), is an enzyme that in humans is encoded by the UBE2Z gene on chromosome 17. It is ubiquitously expressed in many tissues and cell types. UBE2Z is an E2 ubiquitin conjugating enzyme and participates in the second step of protein ubiquitination during proteolysis. A genome-wide association study (GWAS) revealed the UBE2Z gene to be associated with chronic kidney disease. The UBE2Z gene also contains one of 27 SNPs associated with increased risk of coronary artery disease.

== Structure ==
=== Gene ===
The UBE2Z gene resides on chromosome 17 at the band 17q21.32 and contains 7 exons. This gene produces 2 isoforms through alternative splicing. The UBE2Z cDNA spans a length of 3,054 base pairs.

=== Protein ===
This protein belongs to the ubiquitin conjugating enzyme family and is one of the E2 enzymes. UBE2Z spans 246 amino acids, 150 of which encode a conserved 16–18 kDa ubiquitin conjugating enzyme E2 domain (UBC domain) that is located at the enzyme's N-terminal and responsible for the enzyme's catalytic function. This UBC domain has a relatively inflexible β-sheet structure with flanking helices and contains a highly conserved cysteine residue, Cys80, which functions as an active site for the thiol ester formation with ubiquitin. UBE2Z also contains a C-terminal extension, suggested to participate in substrate binding, which is characteristic of a class II E2 ubiquitin conjugating enzyme.

== Function ==
The UBE2Z gene is ubiquitously expressed in human tissues, and its expression is relatively high in placenta, pancreas, spleen and testis. Notably, its expression in cancer tissues is much higher than in relevant normal tissues, especially in kidney, lymph node, colon and ovary cancer. As an E2 member of the ubiquitin-conjugating enzyme family, UBE2Z mainly participates in the second step of protein ubiquitination, which is a major component of protein degradation machinery. Specifically, UBE2Z receives ubiquitin (Ub) from ubiquitin-activating enzyme (E1), mediates the transfer of Ub from E2 to substrate, directly or indirectly with the help of ligase enzyme (E3), which interacts with the substrate and E2-Ub complex. UBE2Z could only be charged by Ub or FAT10 from UBA6 instead of UBA1, distinguishing it from other E2s.

== Clinical significance ==
A study in genetic variants that regulate lipid metabolism and determine the susceptibility to dyslipidemia in Japanese individuals revealed that UBE2Z, together with ZPR1 and Interleukin-6R, may be important loci for hypertriglyceridemia. Moreover, in a GWAS among 2247 Japanese individuals, 29 polymorphisms that were previously identified as susceptible loci for coronary artery disease were investigated to identify a correlation of these loci to chronic kidney disease. This GWAS meta-analysis revealed through a chi-square test that rs46522 on the UBE2Z gene was significantly related to chronic kidney disease.

=== Clinical marker ===
A multi-locus genetic risk score study based on a combination of 27 loci, including the UBE2Z gene, identified individuals at increased risk for both incident and recurrent coronary artery disease events, as well as an enhanced clinical benefit from statin therapy. The study was based on a community cohort study (the Malmo Diet and Cancer study) and four additional randomized controlled trials of primary prevention cohorts (JUPITER and ASCOT) and secondary prevention cohorts (CARE and PROVE IT-TIMI 22).
