= UBE2G2 =

Protein-coding gene in the species Homo sapiens

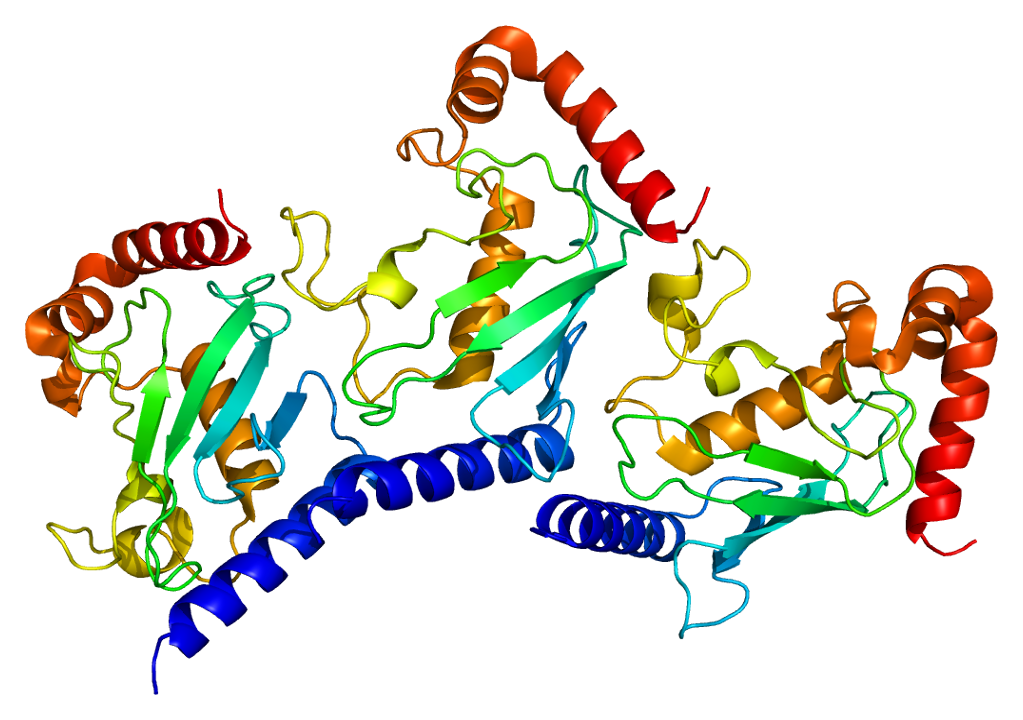

Identifiers
- Aliases: UBE2G2, UBC7, ubiquitin conjugating enzyme E2 G2
- External IDs: OMIM: 603124; MGI: 1343188; GeneCards: UBE2G2
Available structures
PDB	Ortholog search: PDBe RCSB
PDB	List of PDB id codes 2CYX, 2KLY, 2LXP, 3H8K, 4LAD
Enzyme activity
EC #	BRENDA	ExPASy	KEGG	MetaCyc
2.3.2.23	↗	↗	↗	↗

Gene location (Human)
Chr.	Chromosome 21 (human)
Band	21q22.3	Start	44,768,580 bp
Band	21q22.3	End	44,801,826 bp

Gene location (Mouse)
Chr.	Chromosome 10 (mouse)
Band	10 C1|10 39.72 cM	Start	77,458,109 bp
Band	10 C1|10 39.72 cM	End	77,481,827 bp
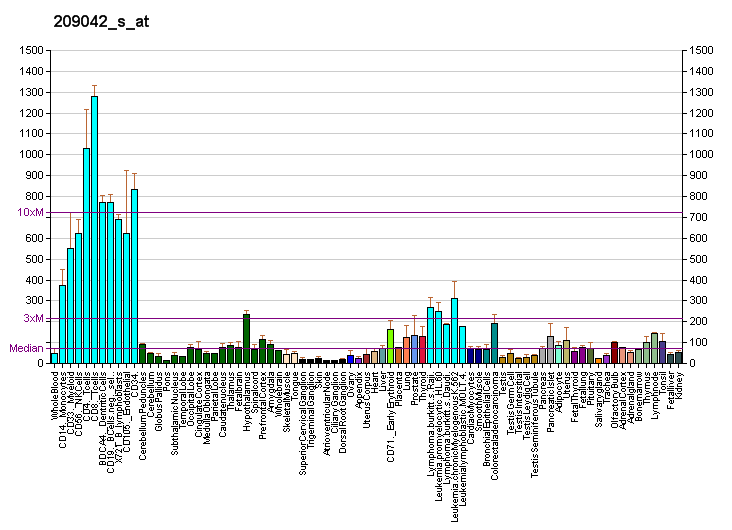

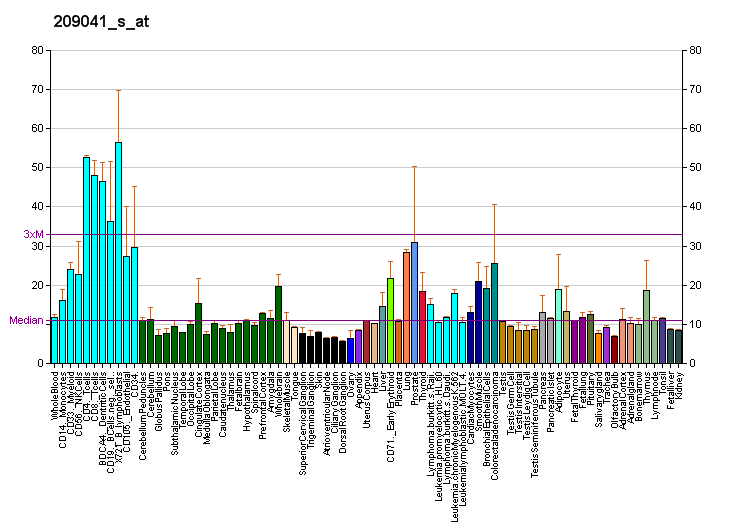
RNA expression pattern
Bgee	Human / Mouse (ortholog); Top expressed in: tendon of biceps brachii; middle frontal gyrus; internal globus pallidus; body of pancreas; paraflocculus of cerebellum; epithelium of colon; right coronary artery; gastrocnemius muscle; endothelial cell; muscle layer of sigmoid colon / Top expressed in: otic placode; otic vesicle; muscle of thigh; saccule; soleus muscle; masseter muscle; interventricular septum; esophagus; lip; ventricular zone; More reference expression data
BioGPS	More reference expression data
Gene ontology
Molecular function	transferase activity; nucleotide binding; protein binding; ATP binding; ubiquitin conjugating enzyme activity; ubiquitin protein ligase binding; ubiquitin protein ligase activity; identical protein binding; ubiquitin-protein transferase activity
Cellular component	endoplasmic reticulum; cytosol
Biological process	ubiquitin-dependent protein catabolic process; protein K48-linked ubiquitination; protein N-linked glycosylation via asparagine; ubiquitin-dependent ERAD pathway; cellular response to interferon-beta; negative regulation of retrograde protein transport, ER to cytosol; protein ubiquitination; protein polyubiquitination
Sources:Amigo / QuickGO
Orthologs
Databases	NCBI: entry; OMA: entry
Species	Human	Mouse
Entrez	7327	22213
Ensembl	ENSG00000184787	ENSMUSG00000009293
UniProt	P60604	P60605
RefSeq (mRNA)	NM_182688; NM_001202489; NM_003343	NM_019803
RefSeq (protein)	NP_001189418; NP_003334; NP_872630	NP_062777
Location (UCSC)	Chr 21: 44.77 – 44.8 Mb	Chr 10: 77.46 – 77.48 Mb
PubMed search
- Wikidata
View/Edit Human	View/Edit Mouse

Ubiquitin-conjugating enzyme E2 G2 is a protein that in humans is encoded by the UBE2G2 gene.

The modification of proteins with ubiquitin is an important cellular mechanism for targeting abnormal or short-lived proteins for degradation. Ubiquitination involves at least three classes of enzymes: ubiquitin-activating enzymes, or E1s, ubiquin-conjugating enzymes, or E2s, and ubiquitin-protein ligases, or E3s. This gene encodes a member of the E2 ubiquitin-conjugating enzyme family. The encoded protein shares 100% sequence identity with the mouse counterpart. This gene is ubiquitously expressed, with high expression seen in adult muscle. Two alternatively spliced transcript variants encoding distinct isoforms have been found for this gene. Ube2g2 is known to interact with a variety of other proteins, including ubiquitin, the AMFR (E3 gp78), and the SYVN1 (Hrd1 RING).
