= UBE2L6 =

Protein-coding gene in the species Homo sapiens

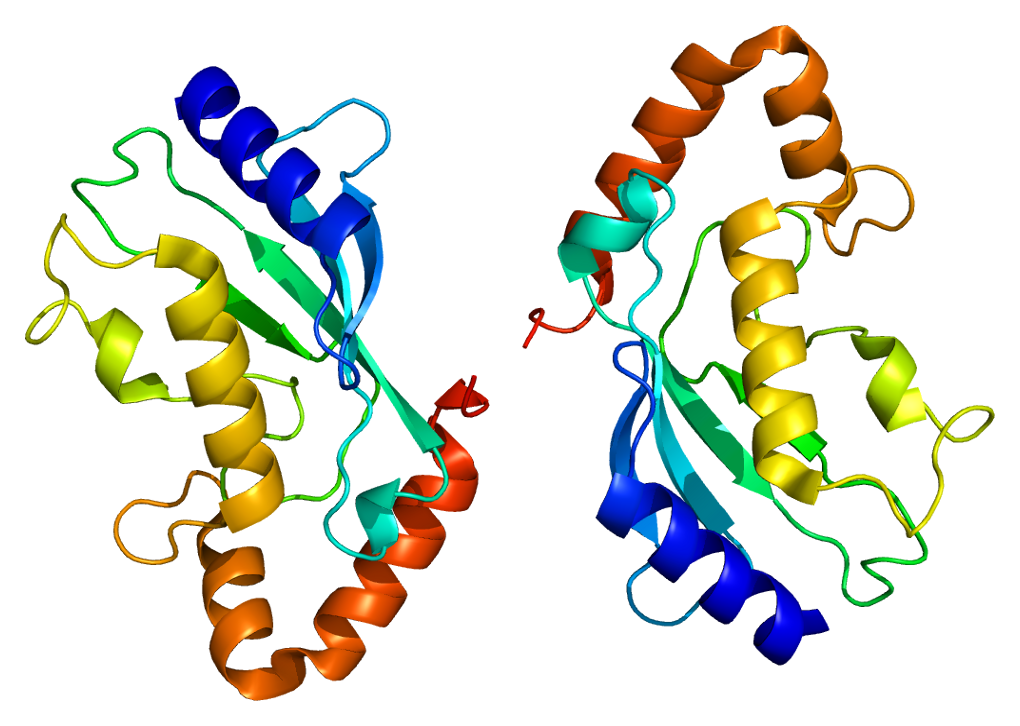

Identifiers
- Aliases: UBE2L6, RIG-B, UBCH8, ubiquitin conjugating enzyme E2 L6
- External IDs: OMIM: 603890; MGI: 1914500; GeneCards: UBE2L6
Available structures
PDB	Ortholog search: PDBe RCSB
PDB	List of PDB id codes 1WZV, 1WZW, 2KJH
Enzyme activity
EC #	BRENDA	ExPASy	KEGG	MetaCyc
2.3.2.23	↗	↗	↗	↗

Gene location (Human)
Chr.	Chromosome 11 (human)
Band	11q12.1	Start	57,551,656 bp
Band	11q12.1	End	57,568,284 bp

Gene location (Mouse)
Chr.	Chromosome 2 (mouse)
Band	2|2 D	Start	84,629,172 bp
Band	2|2 D	End	84,640,679 bp
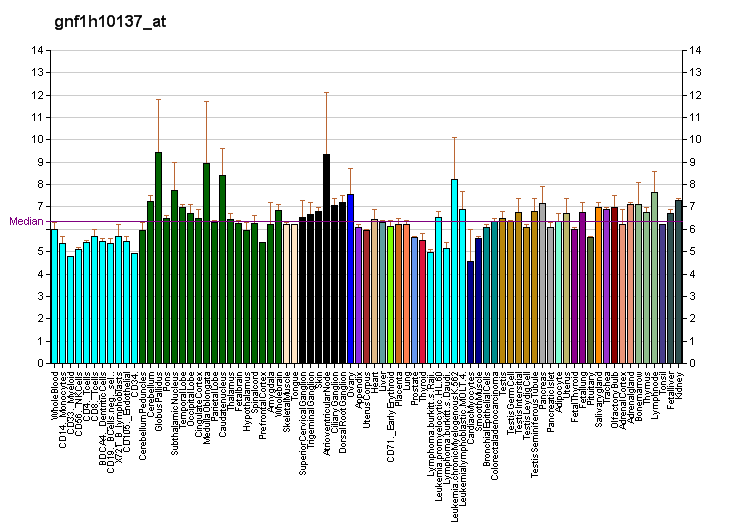

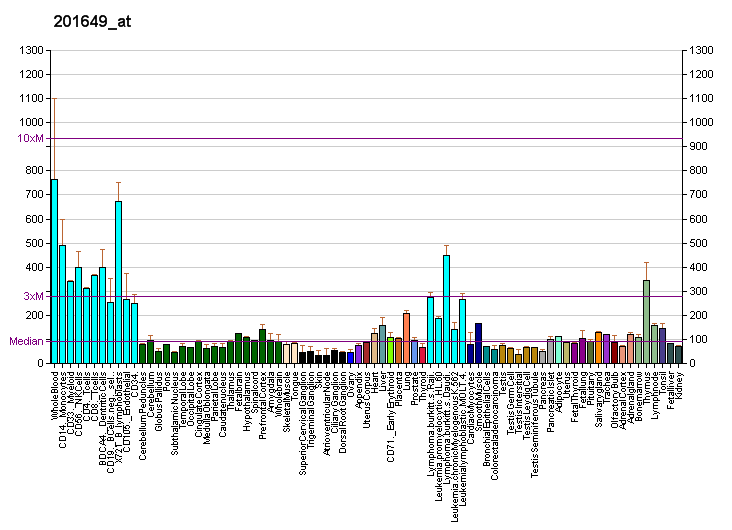
RNA expression pattern
Bgee	Human / Mouse (ortholog); Top expressed in: granulocyte; monocyte; tendon of biceps brachii; palpebral conjunctiva; ganglionic eminence; lymph node; spleen; appendix; gallbladder; stromal cell of endometrium / Top expressed in: blood; blastocyst; granulocyte; fetal liver hematopoietic progenitor cell; yolk sac; tibiofemoral joint; spleen; embryo; lumbar spinal ganglion; duodenum; More reference expression data
BioGPS	More reference expression data
Gene ontology
Molecular function	ubiquitin-like protein transferase activity; transferase activity; ISG15 transferase activity; protein binding; ubiquitin-protein transferase activity; ubiquitin binding; ubiquitin protein ligase binding; ubiquitin conjugating enzyme activity
Cellular component	cytosol; nucleoplasm; ubiquitin ligase complex
Biological process	ISG15-protein conjugation; translesion synthesis; negative regulation of type I interferon production; modification-dependent protein catabolic process; protein ubiquitination; ubiquitin-dependent protein catabolic process
Sources:Amigo / QuickGO
Orthologs
Databases	NCBI: entry; OMA: entry
Species	Human	Mouse
Entrez	9246	56791
Ensembl	ENSG00000156587	ENSMUSG00000027078
UniProt	O14933	Q9QZU9
RefSeq (mRNA)	NM_198183; NM_004223	NM_019949
RefSeq (protein)	NP_004214; NP_937826	NP_064333
Location (UCSC)	Chr 11: 57.55 – 57.57 Mb	Chr 2: 84.63 – 84.64 Mb
PubMed search
- Wikidata
View/Edit Human	View/Edit Mouse

Ubiquitin/ISG15-conjugating enzyme E2 L6 is a protein that in humans is encoded by the UBE2L6 gene.

The modification of proteins with ubiquitin is an important cellular mechanism for targeting abnormal or short-lived proteins for degradation. Ubiquitination involves at least three classes of enzymes: ubiquitin-activating enzymes (E1s), ubiquitin-conjugating enzymes (E2s) and ubiquitin-protein ligases (E3s). This gene encodes a member of the E2 ubiquitin-conjugating enzyme family.

This enzyme is highly similar in primary structure to the enzyme encoded by UBE2L3 gene. Two alternatively spliced transcript variants encoding distinct isoforms have been found for this gene.
