= UBE2E3 =

Protein-coding gene in the species Homo sapiens

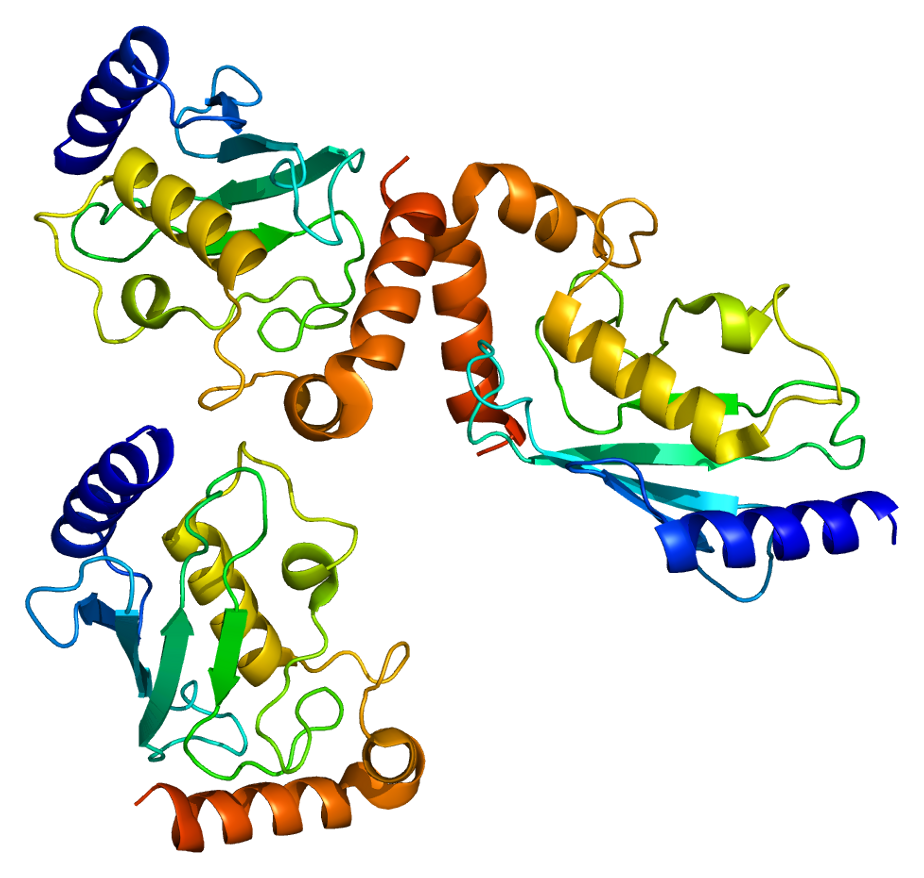

Identifiers
- Aliases: UBE2E3, UBCH9, UbcM2, ubiquitin conjugating enzyme E2 E3
- External IDs: OMIM: 604151; MGI: 107412; GeneCards: UBE2E3
Enzyme activity
EC #	BRENDA	ExPASy	KEGG	MetaCyc
2.3.2.23	↗	↗	↗	↗

Gene location (Human)
Chr.	Chromosome 2 (human)
Band	2q31.3	Start	180,967,248 bp
Band	2q31.3	End	181,076,585 bp

Gene location (Mouse)
Chr.	Chromosome 2 (mouse)
Band	2|2 C3	Start	78,698,468 bp
Band	2|2 C3	End	78,751,637 bp
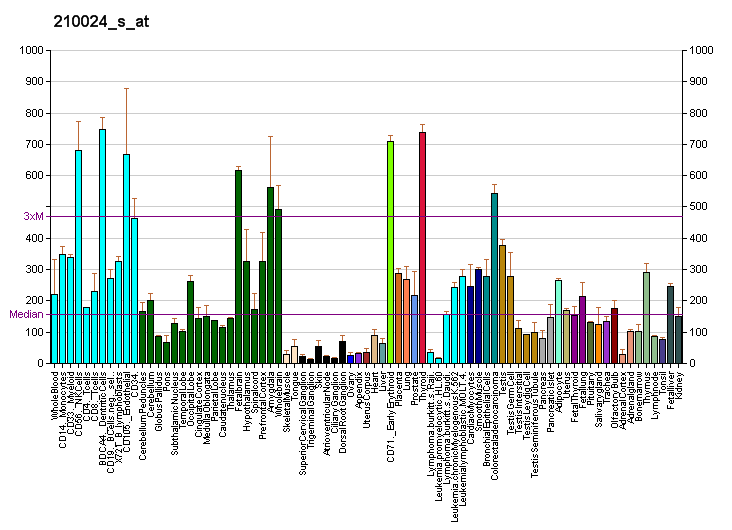
RNA expression pattern
Bgee	Human / Mouse (ortholog); Top expressed in: ganglionic eminence; stromal cell of endometrium; ventricular zone; superior frontal gyrus; muscle of thigh; prefrontal cortex; gallbladder; dorsolateral prefrontal cortex; Brodmann area 9; gastrocnemius muscle / Top expressed in: medial ganglionic eminence; endocardial cushion; abdominal wall; Gonadal ridge; fetal liver hematopoietic progenitor cell; human fetus; atrioventricular valve; atrium; ureter; habenula; More reference expression data
BioGPS	More reference expression data
Gene ontology
Molecular function	ATP binding; nucleotide binding; ubiquitin conjugating enzyme activity; ubiquitin-protein transferase activity; transferase activity; protein binding
Cellular component	nucleus; cytoplasm; nucleoplasm; cytosol
Biological process	protein K63-linked ubiquitination; protein K48-linked ubiquitination; protein K11-linked ubiquitination; regulation of growth; protein ubiquitination
Sources:Amigo / QuickGO
Orthologs
Databases	NCBI: entry; OMA: entry
Species	Human	Mouse
Entrez	10477	22193
Ensembl	ENSG00000170035	ENSMUSG00000027011
UniProt	Q969T4	P52483
RefSeq (mRNA)	NM_001278554; NM_001278555; NM_006357; NM_182678	NM_009454; NM_001356395
RefSeq (protein)	NP_001265483; NP_001265484; NP_006348; NP_872619	NP_033480; NP_001343324
Location (UCSC)	Chr 2: 180.97 – 181.08 Mb	Chr 2: 78.7 – 78.75 Mb
PubMed search
- Wikidata
View/Edit Human	View/Edit Mouse

Ubiquitin-conjugating enzyme E2 E3 is a protein that in humans is encoded by the UBE2E3 gene.

The modification of proteins with ubiquitin is an important cellular mechanism for targeting abnormal or short-lived proteins for degradation. Ubiquitination involves at least three classes of enzymes: ubiquitin-activating enzymes, or E1s, ubiquitin-conjugating enzymes, or E2s, and ubiquitin-protein ligases, or E3s. This gene encodes a member of the E2 ubiquitin-conjugating enzyme family. The encoded protein shares 100% sequence identity with the mouse and rat counterparts, which indicates that this enzyme is highly conserved in eukaryotes. Two alternatively spliced transcript variants encoding the same protein have been found for this gene.
