= UBE2V2 =

Protein-coding gene in the species Homo sapiens

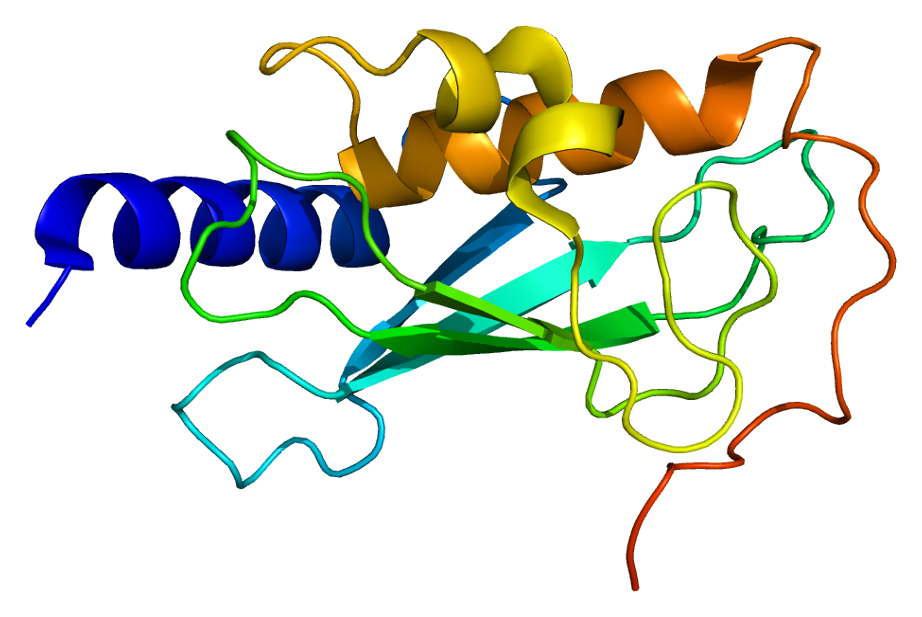

Identifiers
- Aliases: UBE2V2, DDVIT1, DDVit-1, EDAF-1, EDPF-1, EDPF1, MMS2, UEV-2, UEV2, ubiquitin conjugating enzyme E2 V2
- External IDs: OMIM: 603001; MGI: 1917870; GeneCards: UBE2V2
Available structures
PDB	Ortholog search: PDBe RCSB
PDB	List of PDB id codes 1J74, 1J7D, 1ZGU, 3VON, 4NR3, 4NRG, 4NRI, 4ONL, 4ONM, 4ONN, 4ORH, 5AIT

Gene location (Human)
Chr.	Chromosome 8 (human)
Band	8q11.21	Start	48,008,415 bp
Band	8q11.21	End	48,064,708 bp

Gene location (Mouse)
Chr.	Chromosome 16 (mouse)
Band	16|16 A1- A2	Start	15,369,941 bp
Band	16|16 A1- A2	End	15,413,637 bp
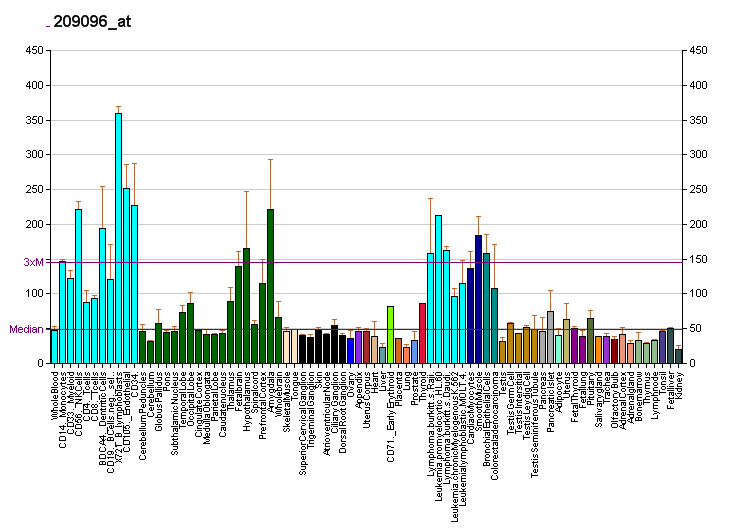
RNA expression pattern
Bgee	Human / Mouse (ortholog); Top expressed in: ganglionic eminence; ventricular zone; prefrontal cortex; pons; Brodmann area 9; islet of Langerhans; Achilles tendon; cartilage tissue; Skeletal muscle tissue of rectus abdominis; oral cavity / Top expressed in: dentate gyrus of hippocampal formation granule cell; embryo; embryo; ventricular zone; morula; blastocyst; primary visual cortex; superior frontal gyrus; yolk sac; muscle of thigh; More reference expression data
BioGPS	More reference expression data
Gene ontology
Molecular function	ubiquitin protein ligase activity; protein binding; ubiquitin conjugating enzyme activity; ubiquitin protein ligase binding
Cellular component	cytoplasm; UBC13-MMS2 complex; extracellular exosome; nucleus; nucleoplasm
Biological process	negative regulation of neuron apoptotic process; postreplication repair; protein K63-linked ubiquitination; regulation of DNA repair; DNA double-strand break processing; positive regulation of DNA repair; protein polyubiquitination; global genome nucleotide-excision repair; protein ubiquitination; error-free postreplication DNA repair; positive regulation of neuron projection development; cell population proliferation; double-strand break repair via nonhomologous end joining; positive regulation of proteasomal ubiquitin-dependent protein catabolic process; positive regulation of synapse assembly
Sources:Amigo / QuickGO
Orthologs
Databases	NCBI: entry; OMA: entry
Species	Human	Mouse
Entrez	7336	70620
Ensembl	ENSG00000169139	ENSMUSG00000022674
UniProt	Q15819	Q9D2M8
RefSeq (mRNA)	NM_003350	NM_001159351; NM_023585
RefSeq (protein)	NP_003341	NP_001152823; NP_076074
Location (UCSC)	Chr 8: 48.01 – 48.06 Mb	Chr 16: 15.37 – 15.41 Mb
PubMed search
- Wikidata
View/Edit Human	View/Edit Mouse

Ubiquitin-conjugating enzyme E2 variant 2 is a protein that in humans is encoded by the UBE2V2 gene. Ubiquitin-conjugating enzyme E2 variant proteins constitute a distinct subfamily within the E2 protein family.

== Structure ==
UBE2V2 has sequence similarity to other ubiquitin-conjugating enzymes but lack the conserved cysteine residue that is critical for the catalytic activity of E2s. The protein encoded by this gene also shares homology with ubiquitin-conjugating enzyme E2 variant 1 and yeast MMS2 gene product.

== Function ==
UBE2V2 has also been implicated as an intracellular sensor of reactive electrophilic species, which are present in high levels during periods of pathogenic and/or environmental stress. The C69 residue of UBE2V2 is capable of binding with various RES. It has been shown that binding of RES to UBE2V2 promotes UBE2V2-mediated activation of Ube2N, another E2 protein that complexes with UBE2V2. Activated Ube2N has been shown to play a major role in promoting DNA-damage responses. Thus, UBE2V2 may promote genome integrity by directly sensing RES and effecting DNA damage responses. It may also be involved in the differentiation of monocytes and enterocytes.

== Interactions ==
UBE2V2 has been shown to interact with HLTF. Although UBE2V2 itself lacks ubiquitin-conjugating activity, it can interact with different Ubiquitin-conjugating enzymes to facilitate their catalytic activities. For instance, UBE2V2 can complex with UBE2N to form a heterodimer capable of synthesizing Lys-63 linked polyubiquitin chains. UBE2V2 may facilitate UBE2N activity by coordinating UBE2N's positioning to promote ubiquitin chain formation specifically at Lys-63, as the ubiquitin molecule has multiple potential Lysine binding sites. Similarly, it has been shown that UBE2V2 interact with the ubiquitin-conjugating enzyme, Ubc13, to induce Ubc13 to adopt an active conformation that can create Lys-63 polyubiquitin chains on various substrates.

Addition of Lys-63 polyubiquitin chains to intracellular targets is distinct from the canonical Lys-48 polyubiquitin chains in that Lys-63 chains do not mediate proteasomal degradation of its substrate. Although their function remains poorly characterized, Lys-63 chains have been shown to regulate signaling pathways by either activating or inhibiting its target protein function. For example, TRIM5alpha restriction of retroviral reverse-transcription is dependent on UBE2V2/UBE2N-mediated poly-ubiquitination. UBE2V2 has been shown to regulate TRIM21 antiviral activity in an analogous manner.
