= HLTF =

Protein-coding gene in the species Homo sapiens

Identifiers
- Aliases: HLTF, HIP116, HIP116A, HLTF1, RNF80, SMARCA3, SNF2L3, ZBU1, helicase-like transcription factor, helicase like transcription factor
- External IDs: OMIM: 603257; MGI: 1196437; GeneCards: HLTF
Available structures
PDB	Ortholog search: PDBe RCSB
PDB	List of PDB id codes 2MZN, 4HRE, 4HRH, 4S0N, 4XZF, 4XZG, 5BNH, 5K5F
Enzyme activity
EC #	BRENDA	ExPASy	KEGG	MetaCyc
2.3.2.27	↗	↗	↗	↗

Gene location (Human)
Chr.	Chromosome 3 (human)
Band	3q24	Start	149,030,127 bp
Band	3q24	End	149,086,554 bp

Gene location (Mouse)
Chr.	Chromosome 3 (mouse)
Band	3 A2|3 6.15 cM	Start	20,111,975 bp
Band	3 A2|3 6.15 cM	End	20,172,654 bp
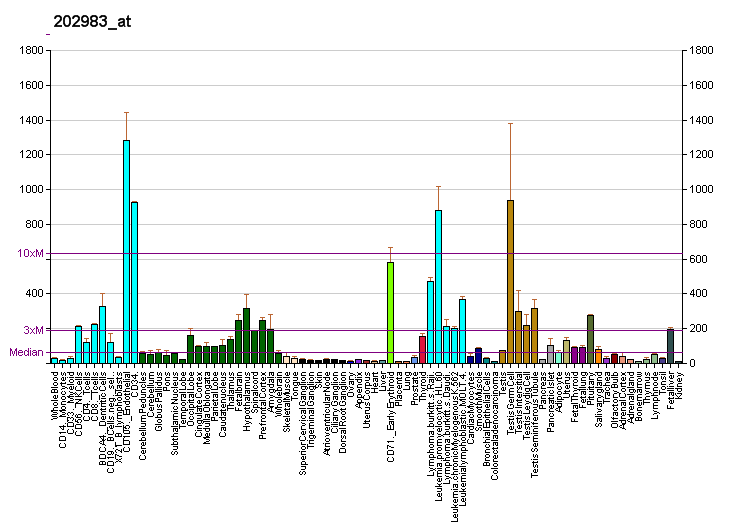
RNA expression pattern
Bgee	Human / Mouse (ortholog); Top expressed in: testicle; pons; lateral nuclear group of thalamus; pars compacta; Epithelium of choroid plexus; pars reticulata; subthalamic nucleus; superior vestibular nucleus; external globus pallidus; cerebellar vermis / Top expressed in: saccule; otic placode; otic vesicle; habenula; atrioventricular valve; transitional epithelium of urinary bladder; mesenteric lymph nodes; retinal pigment epithelium; blood; primitive streak; More reference expression data
BioGPS	More reference expression data
Gene ontology
Molecular function	DNA binding; nucleotide binding; helicase activity; zinc ion binding; DNA-binding transcription activator activity, RNA polymerase II-specific; metal ion binding; RNA polymerase II cis-regulatory region sequence-specific DNA binding; hydrolase activity, acting on acid anhydrides, in phosphorus-containing anhydrides; ATPase activity; protein binding; catalytic activity; nucleic acid binding; hydrolase activity; ATP binding; ubiquitin protein ligase binding; transferase activity; RNA binding; ubiquitin protein ligase activity
Cellular component	cytoplasm; membrane; nucleolus; nucleus; nucleoplasm
Biological process	regulation of transcription, DNA-templated; regulation of transcription by RNA polymerase II; transcription by RNA polymerase II; transcription, DNA-templated; metabolism; positive regulation of transcription by RNA polymerase II; protein ubiquitination; chromatin organization
Sources:Amigo / QuickGO
Orthologs
Databases	NCBI: entry; OMA: entry
Species	Human	Mouse
Entrez	6596	20585
Ensembl	ENSG00000071794	ENSMUSG00000002428
UniProt	Q14527	Q6PCN7
RefSeq (mRNA)	NM_003071; NM_139048; NM_001318934; NM_001318935	NM_009210; NM_144959; NM_001355097
RefSeq (protein)	NP_001305863; NP_001305864; NP_003062; NP_620636	NP_033236; NP_001342026
Location (UCSC)	Chr 3: 149.03 – 149.09 Mb	Chr 3: 20.11 – 20.17 Mb
PubMed search
- Wikidata
View/Edit Human	View/Edit Mouse

Helicase-like transcription factor is an enzyme that in humans is encoded by the HLTF gene.

== Function ==
This gene encodes a member of the SWI/SNF family. Members of this family have helicase and ATPase activities and are thought to regulate transcription of certain genes by altering the chromatin structure around those genes. The encoded protein contains a RING finger DNA binding motif. Two transcript variants encoding the same protein have been found for this gene. However, use of an alternative translation start site produces an isoform that is truncated at the N-terminus compared to the full-length protein.

HLTF is a double-stranded DNA translocase, one of two human homologs of Saccharomyces cerevisiae RAD5 besides SHPRH (SNF2 histone linker PHD RING helicase), that is able to carry out fork regression, similarly to Rad5.

== Interactions ==
HLTF has been shown to interact with UBE2N, RAD18 and UBE2V2(see also STRING functional and physical associations network : under the option 'search by name' enter 'protein name' of interest, HLTF, klick on 'GO! ', choose 'organism ', klick on 'continue ->' ).
