= UBE2Q2 =

Protein-coding gene in humans

Identifiers
- Aliases: UBE2Q2, ubiquitin conjugating enzyme E2 Q2
- External IDs: OMIM: 612501; MGI: 2388672; GeneCards: UBE2Q2
Available structures
PDB	Ortholog search: PDBe RCSB
PDB	List of PDB id codes 1ZUO
Enzyme activity
EC #	BRENDA	ExPASy	KEGG	MetaCyc
2.3.2.23	↗	↗	↗	↗

Gene location (Human)
Chr.	Chromosome 15 (human)
Band	15q24.2	Start	75,843,307 bp
Band	15q24.2	End	75,901,078 bp

Gene location (Mouse)
Chr.	Chromosome 9 (mouse)
Band	9|9 B	Start	55,056,138 bp
Band	9|9 B	End	55,114,813 bp
RNA expression pattern
Bgee	Human / Mouse (ortholog); Top expressed in: secondary oocyte; tibia; palpebral conjunctiva; Achilles tendon; parietal pleura; visceral pleura; synovial membrane; synovial joint; germinal epithelium; saphenous vein / Top expressed in: superior cervical ganglion; spermatid; seminal vesicula; interventricular septum; parotid gland; spermatocyte; hand; muscle of thigh; visual cortex; right kidney; More reference expression data
BioGPS	n/a
Gene ontology
Molecular function	transferase activity; nucleotide binding; ATP binding; ubiquitin-protein transferase activity; ubiquitin conjugating enzyme activity
Cellular component	cytoplasm; cytosol
Biological process	protein K48-linked ubiquitination; protein ubiquitination
Sources:Amigo / QuickGO
Orthologs
Databases	NCBI: entry; OMA: entry
Species	Human	Mouse
Entrez	92912	109161
Ensembl	ENSG00000140367	ENSMUSG00000032307
UniProt	Q8WVN8	Q8K2Z8
RefSeq (mRNA)	NM_001145335; NM_001284382; NM_173469	NM_180600; NM_001346657; NM_001346658
RefSeq (protein)	NP_001138807; NP_001271311; NP_775740	NP_001333586; NP_001333587; NP_850931
Location (UCSC)	Chr 15: 75.84 – 75.9 Mb	Chr 9: 55.06 – 55.11 Mb
PubMed search
- Wikidata
View/Edit Human	View/Edit Mouse

Ubiquitin conjugating enzyme E2 Q2 is an enzyme that in humans is encoded by the gene UBE2Q2. This ubiquitin-conjugating enzyme catalyzes Lys-48-linked polyubiquitination.
