= ATG3 =

Identifiers
- Aliases: ATG3, APG3-LIKE, APG3, autophagy related 3, APG3L, PC3-96
- External IDs: OMIM: 609606; MGI: 1915091; GeneCards: ATG3
Available structures
PDB	Ortholog search: PDBe RCSB
PDB	List of PDB id codes 4NAW

Gene location (Human)
Chr.	Chromosome 3 (human)
Band	3q13.2	Start	112,532,510 bp
Band	3q13.2	End	112,562,046 bp

Gene location (Mouse)
Chr.	Chromosome 16 (mouse)
Band	16|16 B5	Start	44,979,148 bp
Band	16|16 B5	End	45,008,901 bp
RNA expression pattern
Bgee	Human / Mouse (ortholog); Top expressed in: monocyte; sperm; trabecular bone; jejunal mucosa; corpus callosum; bone marrow; external globus pallidus; inferior ganglion of vagus nerve; mucosa of sigmoid colon; pons / Top expressed in: parotid gland; granulocyte; left lobe of liver; epithelium of lens; mesenteric lymph nodes; deep cerebellar nuclei; medial vestibular nucleus; cerebellar vermis; lobe of cerebellum; stroma of bone marrow; More reference expression data
BioGPS	n/a
Gene ontology
Molecular function	ubiquitin-like protein transferase activity; enzyme binding; Atg12 transferase activity; protein binding; Atg8 ligase activity; transferase activity
Cellular component	cytoplasm; cytosol; cytoplasmic ubiquitin ligase complex
Biological process	regulation of cilium assembly; mitochondrial fragmentation involved in apoptotic process; autophagy; protein transport; autophagy of nucleus; autophagy of mitochondrion; autophagosome assembly; protein ubiquitination; protein targeting to membrane; macroautophagy; negative regulation of phagocytosis
Sources:Amigo / QuickGO
Orthologs
Databases	NCBI: entry; OMA: entry
Species	Human	Mouse
Entrez	64422	67841
Ensembl	ENSG00000144848	ENSMUSG00000022663
UniProt	Q9NT62	Q9CPX6
RefSeq (mRNA)	NM_001278712; NM_022488	NM_026402; NM_001356366
RefSeq (protein)	NP_001265641; NP_071933	NP_080678; NP_001343295
Location (UCSC)	Chr 3: 112.53 – 112.56 Mb	Chr 16: 44.98 – 45.01 Mb
PubMed search
- Wikidata
View/Edit Human	View/Edit Mouse

Autophagocytosis associated protein N-terminal

Identifiers
- Symbol: Autophagy_N
- Pfam: PF03986
- InterPro: IPR007134
Available protein structures:
- PDB: IPR007134 PF03986 (ECOD; PDBsum)
- AlphaFold: IPR007134; PF03986

Autophagocytosis associated protein active site domain

Identifiers
- Symbol: Autophagy_act_C
- Pfam: PF03987
- InterPro: IPR007135
Available protein structures:
- PDB: IPR007135 PF03987 (ECOD; PDBsum)
- AlphaFold: IPR007135; PF03987

Autophagocytosis associated protein C-terminal

Identifiers
- Symbol: Autophagy_Cterm
- Pfam: PF10381
- InterPro: IPR019461
Available protein structures:
- PDB: IPR019461 PF10381 (ECOD; PDBsum)
- AlphaFold: IPR019461; PF10381

In molecular biology, autophagy related 3 (Atg3) is the E2 enzyme for the LC3 lipidation process. It is essential for autophagy. The super protein complex, the Atg16L complex, consists of multiple Atg12-Atg5 conjugates. Atg16L has an E3-like role in the LC3 lipidation reaction. The activated intermediate, LC3-Atg3 (E2), is recruited to the site where the lipidation takes place.

Atg3 catalyses the conjugation of Atg8 and phosphatidylethanolamine (PE). Atg3 has an alpha/beta-fold, and its core region is topologically similar to canonical E2 enzymes. Atg3 has two regions inserted in the core region and another with a long alpha-helical structure that protrudes from the core region as far as 30 A. It interacts with atg8 through an intermediate thioester bond between Cys-288 and the C-terminal Gly of atg8. It also interacts with the C-terminal region of the E1-like atg7 enzyme.

Autophagocytosis is a starvation-induced process responsible for transport of cytoplasmic proteins to the lysosome/vacuole. Atg3 is a ubiquitin like modifier that is topologically similar to the canonical E2 enzyme. It catalyses the conjugation of Atg8 and phosphatidylethanolamine.

Atg3 consists of three domains, an N-terminal domain, a catalytic domain and a C-terminal domain. The catalytic domain contains a cysteine residue within an HPC motif, this is the putative active-site residue for recognition of the Apg5 subunit of the autophagosome complex. The small C-terminal domain is likely to be a distinct binding region for the stability of the autophagosome complex. It carries a highly characteristic conserved FLKF sequence motif.
