= SHPRH =

Protein-coding gene in the species Homo sapiens

Identifiers
- Aliases: SHPRH, bA545I5.2, SNF2 histone linker PHD RING helicase, RAD5
- External IDs: OMIM: 608048; MGI: 1917581; GeneCards: SHPRH
Available structures
PDB	Ortholog search: PDBe RCSB
PDB	List of PDB id codes 2M85, 4QN1
Enzyme activity
EC #	BRENDA	ExPASy	KEGG	MetaCyc
2.3.2.27	↗	↗	↗	↗

Gene location (Human)
Chr.	Chromosome 6 (human)
Band	6q24.3	Start	145,864,245 bp
Band	6q24.3	End	145,964,423 bp

Gene location (Mouse)
Chr.	Chromosome 10 (mouse)
Band	10|10 A1	Start	11,025,171 bp
Band	10|10 A1	End	11,093,339 bp
RNA expression pattern
Bgee	Human / Mouse (ortholog); Top expressed in: Achilles tendon; testicle; pancreatic epithelial cell; sural nerve; retinal pigment epithelium; germinal epithelium; gonad; tibia; skin of thigh; bone marrow cell / Top expressed in: secondary oocyte; lobe of cerebellum; cerebellar vermis; primary oocyte; zygote; genital tubercle; lumbar subsegment of spinal cord; ganglionic eminence; trigeminal ganglion; ventricular zone; More reference expression data
BioGPS	n/a
Gene ontology
Molecular function	DNA binding; nucleotide binding; protein binding; hydrolase activity; ATP binding; helicase activity; metal ion binding; ubiquitin-protein transferase activity; ubiquitin protein ligase binding; transferase activity; ubiquitin protein ligase activity
Cellular component	nucleosome; nucleus; nucleoplasm
Biological process	nucleosome assembly; protein polyubiquitination; DNA repair; cellular response to DNA damage stimulus; protein ubiquitination
Sources:Amigo / QuickGO
Orthologs
Databases	NCBI: entry; OMA: entry
Species	Human	Mouse
Entrez	257218	268281
Ensembl	ENSG00000146414	ENSMUSG00000090112
UniProt	Q149N8	Q7TPQ3
RefSeq (mRNA)	NM_001042683; NM_173082; NM_001370327; NM_001370328	NM_001077707; NM_001284354; NM_172937
RefSeq (protein)	NP_001036148; NP_775105; NP_001357256; NP_001357257	NP_001071175; NP_001271283; NP_766525
Location (UCSC)	Chr 6: 145.86 – 145.96 Mb	Chr 10: 11.03 – 11.09 Mb
PubMed search
- Wikidata
View/Edit Human	View/Edit Mouse

E3 ubiquitin-protein ligase SHPRH is an enzyme that in humans is encoded by the SHPRH gene.

== Function ==
SHPRH is a ubiquitously expressed protein that contains motifs characteristics of several DNA repair proteins, transcription factors, and helicases.[supplied by OMIM] SHPRH is a nucleosome-stimulated ATPase and a nucleosome-E3 ubiquitin ligase.
