= UBE2D3 =

Protein-coding gene in the species Homo sapiens

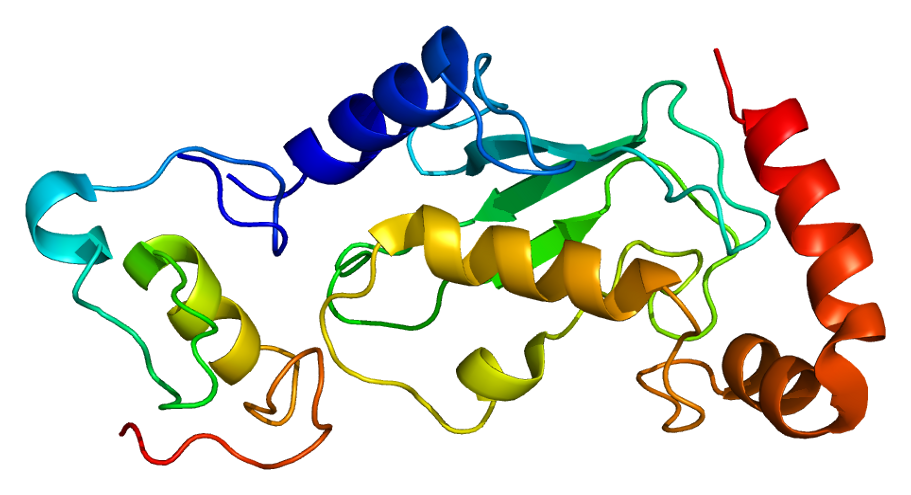

Identifiers
- Aliases: UBE2D3, E2(17)KB3, UBC4/5, UBCH5C, ubiquitin conjugating enzyme E2 D3
- External IDs: OMIM: 602963; MGI: 1913355; GeneCards: UBE2D3
Available structures
| PDB | Ortholog search: PDBe RCSB |
| PDB | List of PDB id codes 1X23, 2FUH, 3L1Z, 3RPG, 3UGB, 4BVU, 4R8P, 4S3O, 5IFR |
Enzyme activity
| EC # | BRENDA | ExPASy | KEGG | MetaCyc |
|---|---|---|---|---|
| 2.3.2.23 | ↗ | ↗ | ↗ | ↗ |
| 2.3.2.24 | ↗ | ↗ | ↗ | ↗ |

Gene location (Human)
| Chr. | Chromosome 4 (human) |
| Band | 4q24 | Start | 102,794,383 bp |
| Band | 4q24 | End | 102,868,896 bp |

Gene location (Mouse)
| Chr. | Chromosome 3 (mouse) |
| Band | 3|3 G3 | Start | 135,438,149 bp |
| Band | 3|3 G3 | End | 135,468,198 bp |
RNA expression pattern
| Bgee | Human / Mouse (ortholog); Top expressed in: secondary oocyte; sperm; Achilles tendon; monocyte; buccal mucosa cell; blood; cartilage tissue; islet of Langerhans; appendix; right lung / Top expressed in: genital tubercle; seminiferous tubule; tail of embryo; zygote; somite; secondary oocyte; dermis; molar; skin of external ear; abdominal wall; More reference expression data |
| BioGPS | n/a |
Gene ontology
| Molecular function | transferase activity; nucleotide binding; protein binding; ATP binding; ubiquitin conjugating enzyme activity; ubiquitin-protein transferase activity |
| Cellular component | cytosol; endosome; membrane; plasma membrane; nucleoplasm; endosome membrane; extracellular exosome |
| Biological process | positive regulation of protein targeting to mitochondrion; protein polyubiquitination; negative regulation of transcription by RNA polymerase II; protein monoubiquitination; BMP signaling pathway; cellular response to DNA damage stimulus; protein K11-linked ubiquitination; TRIF-dependent toll-like receptor signaling pathway; protein K48-linked ubiquitination; regulation of transcription from RNA polymerase II promoter in response to hypoxia; DNA repair; protein autoubiquitination; apoptotic process; protein ubiquitination; ubiquitin-dependent protein catabolic process; proteasome-mediated ubiquitin-dependent protein catabolic process; MyD88-independent toll-like receptor signaling pathway |
Sources:Amigo / QuickGO
Orthologs
| Databases | NCBI: entry; OMA: entry |
| Species | Human | Mouse |
| Entrez | 7323 | 66105 |
| Ensembl | ENSG00000109332 | ENSMUSG00000078578 |
| UniProt | P61077 | P61079 |
| RefSeq (mRNA) | NM_001300795; NM_003340; NM_181886; NM_181887; NM_181888 NM_181889; NM_181890; NM_181891; NM_181892; NM_181893 | NM_025356 |
| RefSeq (protein) | NP_001287724; NP_003331; NP_871615; NP_871616; NP_871617 NP_871618; NP_871619; NP_871620; NP_871621; NP_871622 | NP_079632; NP_001343523; NP_001343524; NP_001343525; NP_001343526 NP_001343527 |
| Location (UCSC) | Chr 4: 102.79 – 102.87 Mb | Chr 3: 135.44 – 135.47 Mb |
| PubMed search |
- Wikidata
| View/Edit Human | View/Edit Mouse |

Ubiquitin-conjugating enzyme E2 D3 is a protein that in humans is encoded by the UBE2D3 gene.

== Function ==
The modification of proteins with ubiquitin is an important cellular mechanism for targeting abnormal or short-lived proteins for degradation. Ubiquitination involves at least three classes of enzymes: ubiquitin-activating enzymes, or E1s, ubiquitin-conjugating enzymes, or E2s, and ubiquitin-protein ligases, or E3s. This gene encodes a member of the E2 ubiquitin-conjugating enzyme family. This enzyme functions in the ubiquitination of the tumor-suppressor protein p53, which is induced by an E3 ubiquitin-protein ligase. Multiple spliced transcript variants have been found for this gene, but the full-length nature of some variants has not been determined.

== Interactions ==
UBE2D3 has been shown to interact with NEDD4.
