= UBE2V1 =

Protein-coding gene in the species Homo sapiens

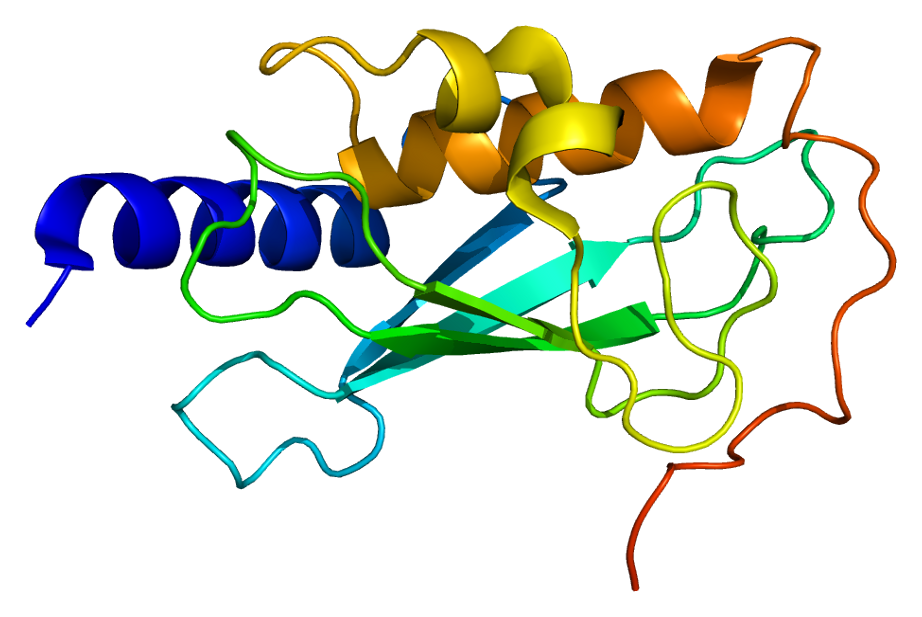

Identifiers
- Aliases: UBE2V1, CIR1, CROC-1, CROC1, UBE2V, UEV-1, UEV1, UEV1A, ubiquitin conjugating enzyme E2 V1
- External IDs: OMIM: 602995; MGI: 1913839; GeneCards: UBE2V1
Available structures
PDB	Ortholog search: PDBe RCSB
PDB	List of PDB id codes 2A4D, 2C2V, 2HLW

Gene location (Human)
Chr.	Chromosome 20 (human)
Band	20q13.13	Start	50,081,124 bp
Band	20q13.13	End	50,115,959 bp

Gene location (Mouse)
Chr.	Chromosome 2 (mouse)
Band	2 H3|2 87.44 cM	Start	167,449,558 bp
Band	2 H3|2 87.44 cM	End	167,474,015 bp
RNA expression pattern
Bgee	Human / Mouse (ortholog); Top expressed in: epithelium of colon; superior frontal gyrus; tonsil; smooth muscle tissue; placenta; ganglionic eminence; primary visual cortex; bone marrow cell; skin of leg; monocyte / Top expressed in: tail of embryo; epiblast; Cortex of frontal lobe; dentate gyrus of hippocampal formation granule cell; superior frontal gyrus; striatum of neuraxis; neural tube; urinary bladder; ventricular zone; primary visual cortex; More reference expression data
BioGPS	n/a
Gene ontology
Molecular function	protein binding; ubiquitin protein ligase activity; ubiquitin protein ligase binding; ubiquitin conjugating enzyme activity
Cellular component	cytoplasm; cytosol; ubiquitin conjugating enzyme complex; UBC13-UEV1A complex; ubiquitin ligase complex; extracellular exosome; nucleus; nucleoplasm; protein-containing complex
Biological process	protein polyubiquitination; Fc-epsilon receptor signaling pathway; protein K63-linked ubiquitination; nucleotide-binding oligomerization domain containing signaling pathway; positive regulation of transcription, DNA-templated; stimulatory C-type lectin receptor signaling pathway; regulation of DNA repair; regulation of transcription, DNA-templated; T cell receptor signaling pathway; cell differentiation; postreplication repair; positive regulation of I-kappaB kinase/NF-kappaB signaling; JNK cascade; positive regulation of NF-kappaB transcription factor activity; interleukin-1-mediated signaling pathway
Sources:Amigo / QuickGO
Orthologs
Databases	NCBI: entry; OMA: entry
Species	Human	Mouse
Entrez	7335	66589
Ensembl	ENSG00000244687	ENSMUSG00000078923
UniProt	Q13404	Q9CZY3
RefSeq (mRNA)	NM_001032288; NM_001257393; NM_001257394; NM_001257395; NM_001257396 NM_001257397; NM_001257398; NM_001257399; NM_001282575; NM_001282576; NM_001282577; NM_001282578; NM_001282579; NM_001282580; NM_021988; NM_022442; NM_199144	NM_023230; NM_001311131; NM_001311146
RefSeq (protein)	NP_001027459; NP_001244322; NP_001244323; NP_001244324; NP_001244325 NP_001244326; NP_001244327; NP_001244328; NP_001269504; NP_001269505; NP_001269506; NP_001269507; NP_001269508; NP_001269509; NP_068823; NP_071887; NP_954595; NP_954673	NP_001298060; NP_001298075; NP_075719
Location (UCSC)	Chr 20: 50.08 – 50.12 Mb	Chr 2: 167.45 – 167.47 Mb
PubMed search
- Wikidata
View/Edit Human	View/Edit Mouse

Ubiquitin-conjugating enzyme E2 variant 1 is a protein that in humans is encoded by the UBE2V1 gene.

== Function ==
Ubiquitin-conjugating E2 enzyme variant proteins constitute a distinct subfamily within the E2 protein family. They have sequence similarity to other ubiquitin-conjugating enzymes but lack the conserved cysteine residue that is critical for the catalytic activity of E2s. The protein encoded by this gene is located in the nucleus and can cause transcriptional activation of the human FOS proto-oncogene. It is thought to be involved in the control of differentiation by altering cell cycle behavior. Multiple alternatively spliced transcripts encoding different isoforms have been described for this gene. A pseudogene has been identified which is also located on chromosome 20. Co-transcription of this gene and the neighboring upstream gene generates a rare transcript (Kua-UEV), which encodes a fusion protein consisting of sequence sharing identity with each individual gene product.

== Interactions ==
UBE2V1 has been shown to interact with UBE2N.
