= UBE2R2 =

Protein-coding gene in the species Homo sapiens

Identifiers
- Aliases: UBE2R2, CDC34B, E2-CDC34B, UBC3B, ubiquitin conjugating enzyme E2 R2
- External IDs: OMIM: 612506; MGI: 1914865; GeneCards: UBE2R2
Enzyme activity
EC #	BRENDA	ExPASy	KEGG	MetaCyc
2.3.2.23	↗	↗	↗	↗

Gene location (Human)
Chr.	Chromosome 9 (human)
Band	9p13.3	Start	33,817,160 bp
Band	9p13.3	End	33,920,399 bp

Gene location (Mouse)
Chr.	Chromosome 4 (mouse)
Band	4|4 A5	Start	41,135,743 bp
Band	4|4 A5	End	41,193,380 bp
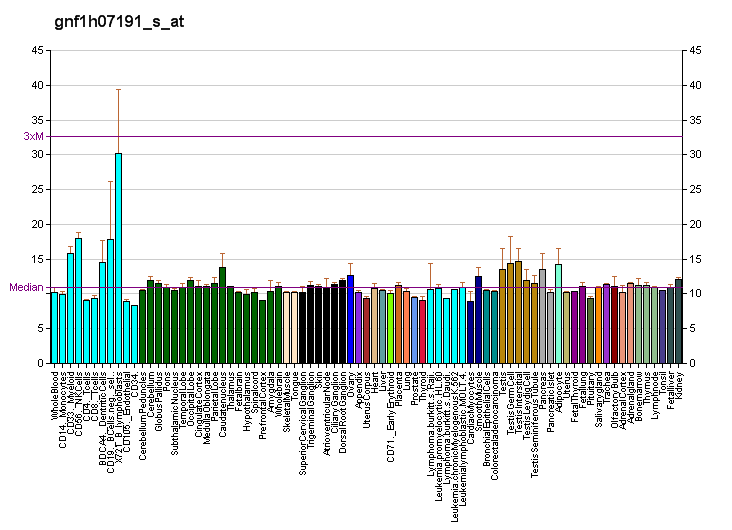

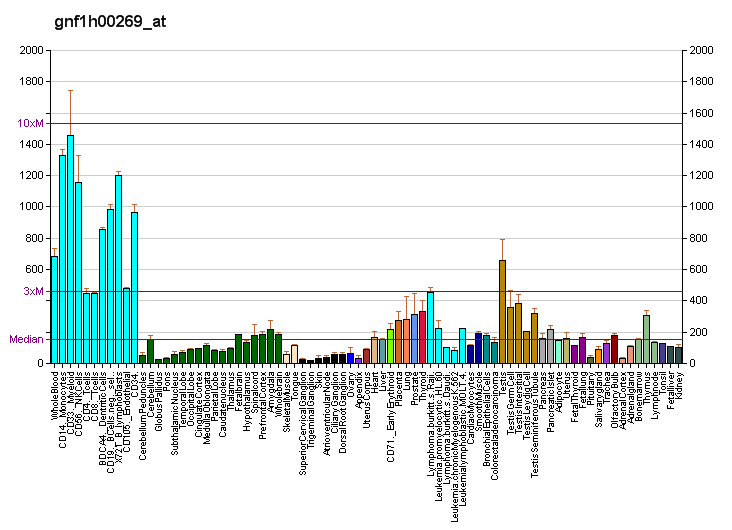
RNA expression pattern
Bgee	Human / Mouse (ortholog); Top expressed in: sperm; secondary oocyte; mucosa of ileum; myocardium of left ventricle; tibialis anterior muscle; cardiac muscle tissue of right atrium; nipple; skin of arm; Skeletal muscle tissue of rectus abdominis; decidua / Top expressed in: genital tubercle; tail of embryo; blood; ascending aorta; aortic valve; Rostral migratory stream; internal carotid artery; lactiferous gland; muscle of thigh; external carotid artery; More reference expression data
BioGPS	More reference expression data
Gene ontology
Molecular function	transferase activity; nucleotide binding; protein binding; ATP binding; ubiquitin conjugating enzyme activity; ubiquitin protein ligase binding; ubiquitin protein ligase activity; ubiquitin-protein transferase activity
Cellular component	cytoplasm; cytosol
Biological process	protein K48-linked ubiquitination; protein monoubiquitination; proteasome-mediated ubiquitin-dependent protein catabolic process; protein ubiquitination; protein polyubiquitination; ubiquitin-dependent protein catabolic process
Sources:Amigo / QuickGO
Orthologs
Databases	NCBI: entry; OMA: entry
Species	Human	Mouse
Entrez	54926	67615
Ensembl	ENSG00000107341	ENSMUSG00000036241
UniProt	Q712K3	Q6ZWZ2
RefSeq (mRNA)	NM_017811	NM_026275
RefSeq (protein)	NP_060281	NP_080551
Location (UCSC)	Chr 9: 33.82 – 33.92 Mb	Chr 4: 41.14 – 41.19 Mb
PubMed search
- Wikidata
View/Edit Human	View/Edit Mouse

Ubiquitin-conjugating enzyme E2 R2 is a protein that in humans is encoded by the UBE2R2 gene.

Protein kinase CK2 is a ubiquitous and pleiotropic Ser/Thr protein kinase involved in cell growth and transformation. This gene encodes a protein similar to the E2 ubiquitin conjugating enzyme UBC3/CDC34. Studies suggest that CK2-dependent phosphorylation of this ubiquitin-conjugating enzyme functions by regulating beta-TrCP substrate recognition and induces its interaction with beta-TrCP, enhancing beta-catenin degradation.
