= UBE2J1 =

Protein-coding gene in the species Homo sapiens

Identifiers
- Aliases: UBE2J1, HSPC153, HSPC205, HSU93243, NCUBE-1, NCUBE1, UBC6, Ubc6p, CGI-76, UBC6E, ubiquitin conjugating enzyme E2 J1
- External IDs: OMIM: 616175; MGI: 1926245; GeneCards: UBE2J1
Enzyme activity
EC #	BRENDA	ExPASy	KEGG	MetaCyc
2.3.2.23	↗	↗	↗	↗

Gene location (Human)
Chr.	Chromosome 6 (human)
Band	6q15	Start	89,326,625 bp
Band	6q15	End	89,352,722 bp

Gene location (Mouse)
Chr.	Chromosome 4 (mouse)
Band	4|4 A5	Start	33,031,416 bp
Band	4|4 A5	End	33,052,363 bp
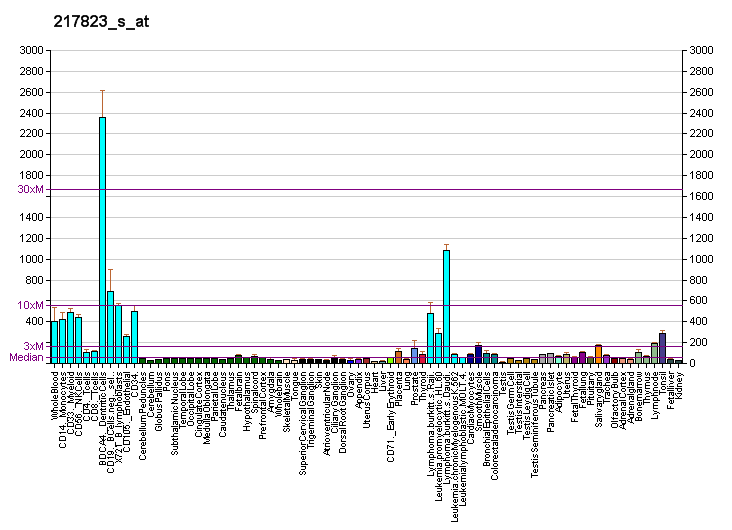

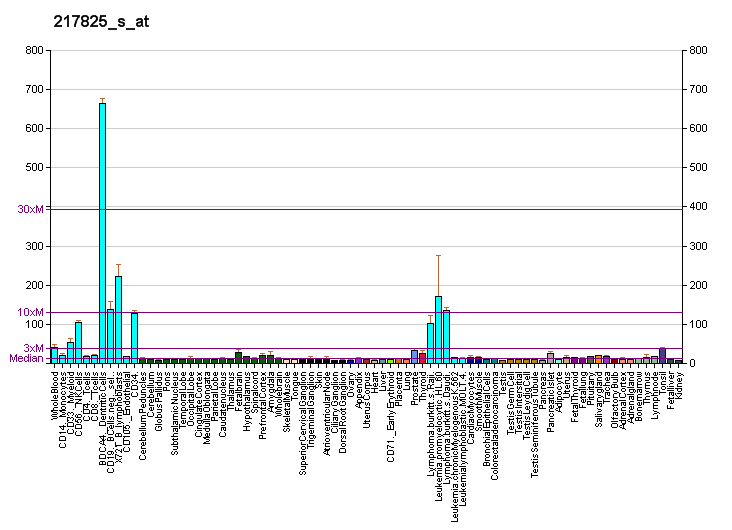

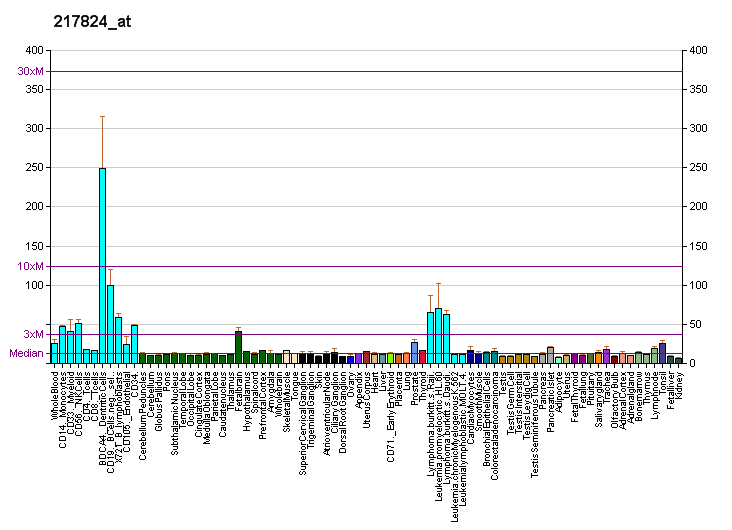
RNA expression pattern
Bgee	Human / Mouse (ortholog); Top expressed in: sperm; monocyte; bone marrow cell; parotid gland; rectum; epithelium of nasopharynx; amniotic fluid; tonsil; appendix; lymph node / Top expressed in: seminiferous tubule; lacrimal gland; ectoderm; otic vesicle; otic placode; saccule; facial motor nucleus; anterior horn of spinal cord; spermatid; medial vestibular nucleus; More reference expression data
BioGPS	More reference expression data
Gene ontology
Molecular function	transferase activity; nucleotide binding; ATP binding; ubiquitin protein ligase binding; ubiquitin protein ligase activity; ubiquitin conjugating enzyme activity
Cellular component	cytoplasm; membrane; integral component of membrane; endoplasmic reticulum membrane; endoplasmic reticulum
Biological process	protein N-linked glycosylation via asparagine; protein ubiquitination; ubiquitin-dependent ERAD pathway; spermatid development; negative regulation of retrograde protein transport, ER to cytosol
Sources:Amigo / QuickGO
Orthologs
Databases	NCBI: entry; OMA: entry
Species	Human	Mouse
Entrez	51465	56228
Ensembl	ENSG00000198833	ENSMUSG00000028277
UniProt	Q9Y385	Q9JJZ4
RefSeq (mRNA)	NM_016021	NM_019586; NM_001355494
RefSeq (protein)	NP_057105	NP_062532; NP_001342423
Location (UCSC)	Chr 6: 89.33 – 89.35 Mb	Chr 4: 33.03 – 33.05 Mb
PubMed search
- Wikidata
View/Edit Human	View/Edit Mouse

Ubiquitin-conjugating enzyme E2 J1 is a protein that in humans is encoded by the UBE2J1 gene.

The modification of proteins with ubiquitin is an important cellular mechanism for targeting abnormal or short-lived proteins for degradation. Ubiquitination involves at least three classes of enzymes: ubiquitin-activating enzymes, or E1s, ubiquitin-conjugating enzymes, or E2s, and ubiquitin-protein ligases, or E3s.

This gene encodes a member of the E2 ubiquitin-conjugating enzyme family. This enzyme is located in the membrane of the endoplasmic reticulum (ER) and may contribute to quality control ER-associated degradation by the ubiquitin-proteasome system.
