= UBE2T =

Human protein-coding gene

Identifiers
- Aliases: UBE2T, PIG50, FANCT, HSPC150, ubiquitin conjugating enzyme E2 T
- External IDs: OMIM: 610538; MGI: 1914446; GeneCards: UBE2T
Available structures
PDB	Ortholog search: PDBe RCSB
PDB	List of PDB id codes 1YH2, 4CCG
Enzyme activity
EC #	BRENDA	ExPASy	KEGG	MetaCyc
2.3.2.23	↗	↗	↗	↗

Gene location (Human)
Chr.	Chromosome 1 (human)
Band	1q32.1	Start	202,331,657 bp
Band	1q32.1	End	202,341,980 bp

Gene location (Mouse)
Chr.	Chromosome 1 (mouse)
Band	1|1 E4	Start	134,890,303 bp
Band	1|1 E4	End	134,901,900 bp
RNA expression pattern
Bgee	Human / Mouse (ortholog); Top expressed in: oocyte; ventricular zone; ganglionic eminence; gonad; secondary oocyte; testicle; mucosa of transverse colon; rectum; right testis; biceps brachii / Top expressed in: primary oocyte; spermatocyte; zygote; secondary oocyte; seminiferous tubule; embryo; morula; epiblast; endocardial cushion; embryo; More reference expression data
BioGPS	n/a
Gene ontology
Molecular function	transferase activity; nucleotide binding; ubiquitin protein ligase activity; chromatin binding; ubiquitin-protein transferase activity; ATP binding; ubiquitin conjugating enzyme activity; ubiquitin protein ligase binding; protein binding
Cellular component	cytoplasm; nucleoplasm; nucleus; nucleolus
Biological process	protein K29-linked ubiquitination; interstrand cross-link repair; protein K63-linked ubiquitination; protein monoubiquitination; protein K27-linked ubiquitination; cellular response to DNA damage stimulus; protein K11-linked ubiquitination; protein K48-linked ubiquitination; protein K6-linked ubiquitination; protein autoubiquitination; DNA repair; protein ubiquitination
Sources:Amigo / QuickGO
Orthologs
Databases	NCBI: entry; OMA: entry
Species	Human	Mouse
Entrez	29089	67196
Ensembl	ENSG00000077152	ENSMUSG00000026429
UniProt	Q9NPD8	Q9CQ37
RefSeq (mRNA)	NM_014176; NM_001310326	NM_001278115; NM_026024
RefSeq (protein)	NP_001297255; NP_054895; NP_054895.1	NP_001265044; NP_080300
Location (UCSC)	Chr 1: 202.33 – 202.34 Mb	Chr 1: 134.89 – 134.9 Mb
PubMed search
- Wikidata
View/Edit Human	View/Edit Mouse

Ubiquitin conjugating enzyme E2 T is a protein that in humans is encoded by the UBE2T gene.

The protein encoded by this gene catalyzes the covalent attachment of ubiquitin to protein substrates. Defects in this gene have been associated with Fanconi anemia of complementation group T. Two transcript variants encoding different isoforms have been found for this gene.
