= UBE2N =

Protein-coding gene in humans

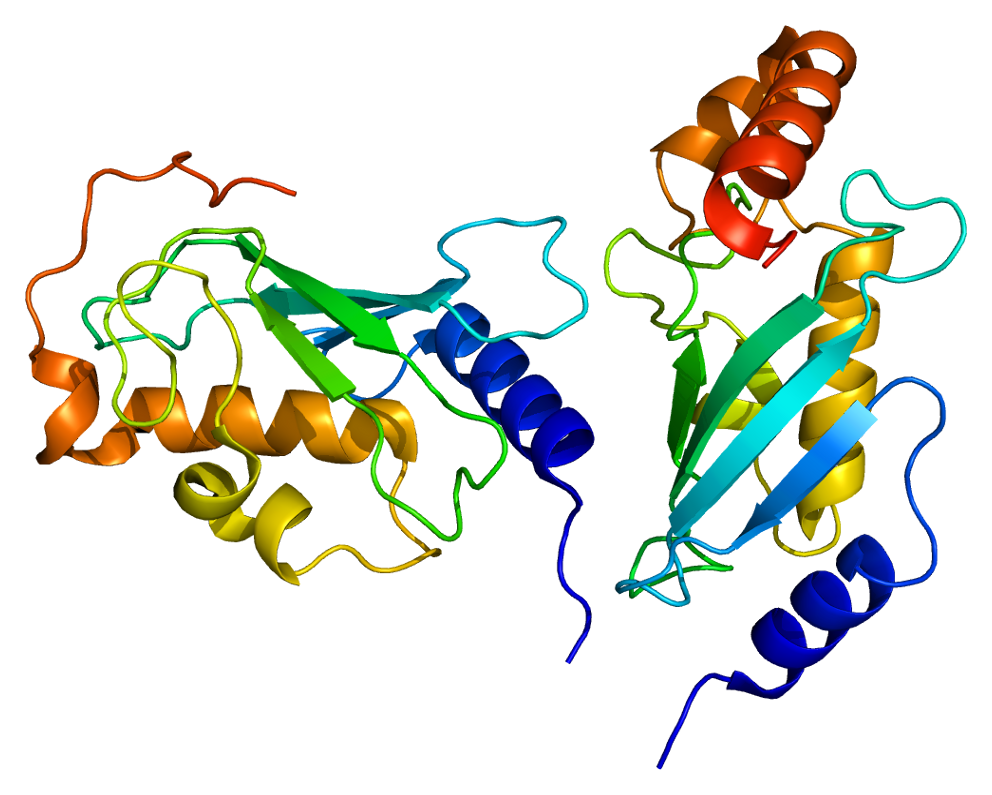

Identifiers
- Aliases: UBE2N, HEL-S-71, UBC13, UBCHBEN; UBC13, UbcH-ben, UbcH13, ubiquitin conjugating enzyme E2 N, UBCHBEN
- External IDs: OMIM: 603679; MGI: 1934835; GeneCards: UBE2N
Available structures
| PDB | Ortholog search: PDBe RCSB |
| PDB | List of PDB id codes 1J7D, 2C2V, 3HCT, 3HCU, 3VON, 3W31, 4DHI, 4DHJ, 4DHZ, 4IP3, 4NR3, 4NRG, 4NRI, 4ONL, 4ONM, 4ONN, 4ORH, 4TKP, 5AIT, 5AIU, 4WHV |
Enzyme activity
| EC # | BRENDA | ExPASy | KEGG | MetaCyc |
|---|---|---|---|---|
| 2.3.2.23 | ↗ | ↗ | ↗ | ↗ |

Gene location (Human)
| Chr. | Chromosome 12 (human) |
| Band | 12q22 | Start | 93,405,673 bp |
| Band | 12q22 | End | 93,441,947 bp |

Gene location (Mouse)
| Chr. | Chromosome 10 (mouse) |
| Band | 10|10 C2 | Start | 95,351,007 bp |
| Band | 10|10 C2 | End | 95,381,519 bp |
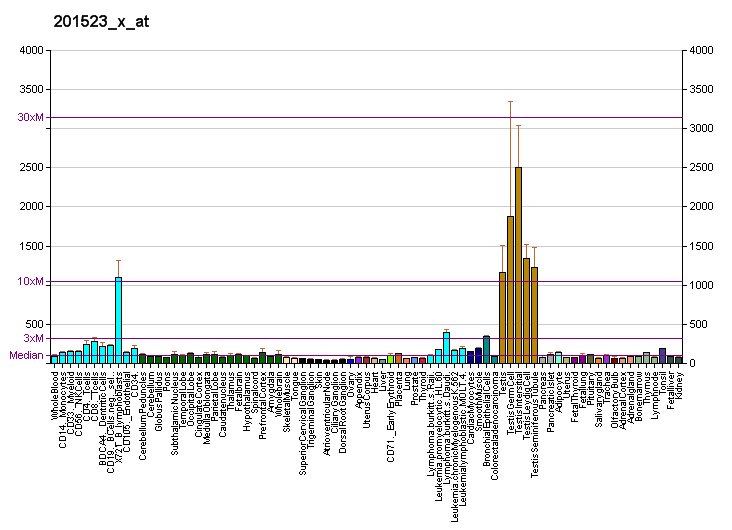

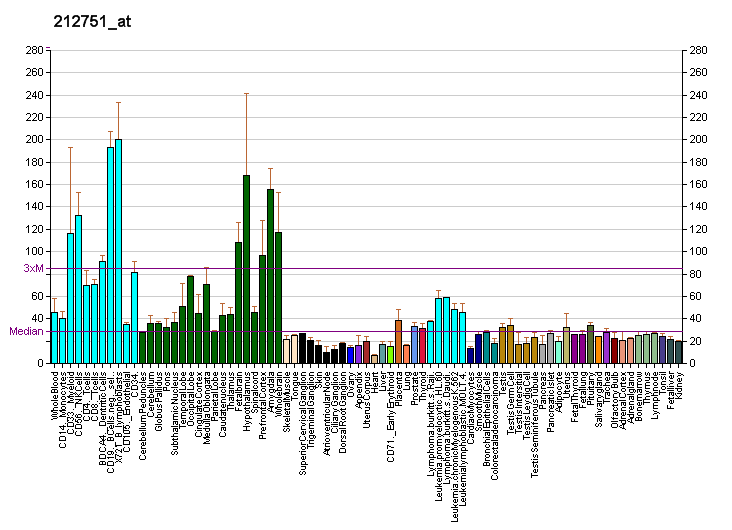

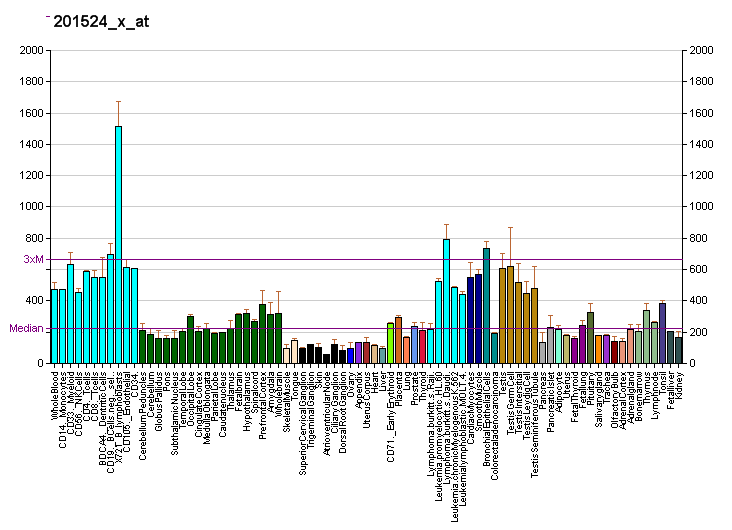
RNA expression pattern
| Bgee | Human / Mouse (ortholog); Top expressed in: left testis; right testis; sperm; ganglionic eminence; islet of Langerhans; ventricular zone; right ventricle; pons; human penis; myocardium / Top expressed in: spermatid; spermatocyte; ventricular zone; tail of embryo; esophagus; embryo; embryo; dentate gyrus of hippocampal formation granule cell; blastocyst; yolk sac; More reference expression data |
| BioGPS | More reference expression data |
Gene ontology
| Molecular function | transferase activity; nucleotide binding; ubiquitin protein ligase activity; ubiquitin binding; protein binding; ATP binding; ubiquitin protein ligase binding; RNA binding; ubiquitin-protein transferase activity; ubiquitin conjugating enzyme activity |
| Cellular component | cytoplasm; cytosol; UBC13-UEV1A complex; ubiquitin ligase complex; nucleoplasm; extracellular exosome; UBC13-MMS2 complex; nucleus; fibrillar center; protein-containing complex |
| Biological process | postreplication repair; protein K63-linked ubiquitination; regulation of DNA repair; DNA double-strand break processing; positive regulation of DNA repair; stimulatory C-type lectin receptor signaling pathway; proteolysis; cellular response to DNA damage stimulus; Fc-epsilon receptor signaling pathway; global genome nucleotide-excision repair; positive regulation of histone modification; positive regulation of ubiquitin-protein transferase activity; protein ubiquitination; regulation of histone ubiquitination; positive regulation of I-kappaB kinase/NF-kappaB signaling; T cell receptor signaling pathway; double-strand break repair via nonhomologous end joining; nucleotide-binding oligomerization domain containing signaling pathway; histone ubiquitination; DNA repair; double-strand break repair via homologous recombination; JNK cascade; positive regulation of NF-kappaB transcription factor activity; ubiquitin-dependent protein catabolic process; interleukin-1-mediated signaling pathway |
Sources:Amigo / QuickGO
Orthologs
| Databases | NCBI: entry; OMA: entry |
| Species | Human | Mouse |
| Entrez | 7334 | 93765 |
| Ensembl | ENSG00000177889 | ENSMUSG00000074781 |
| UniProt | P61088 | P61089 |
| RefSeq (mRNA) | NM_003348 | NM_080560 |
| RefSeq (protein) | NP_003339 | NP_542127 |
| Location (UCSC) | Chr 12: 93.41 – 93.44 Mb | Chr 10: 95.35 – 95.38 Mb |
| PubMed search |
- Wikidata
| View/Edit Human | View/Edit Mouse |

Ubiquitin-conjugating enzyme E2 N is a protein that in humans is encoded by the UBE2N gene.

== Function ==
The modification of proteins with ubiquitin is an important cellular mechanism for targeting abnormal or short-lived proteins for degradation. Ubiquitination involves at least three classes of enzymes: ubiquitin-activating enzymes, or E1s, ubiquitin-conjugating enzymes, or E2s, and ubiquitin-protein ligases, or E3s. This gene encodes a member of the E2 ubiquitin-conjugating enzyme family. Studies in mouse suggest that this protein plays a role in DNA postreplication repair.

== Interactions ==
UBE2N has been shown to interact with:

- AURKA,
- HLTF,
- TRAF2,
- TRAF6, and
- UBE2V1.
