= Ubiquitin-activating enzyme =

Class of enzymes

Ubiquitin-activating enzymes
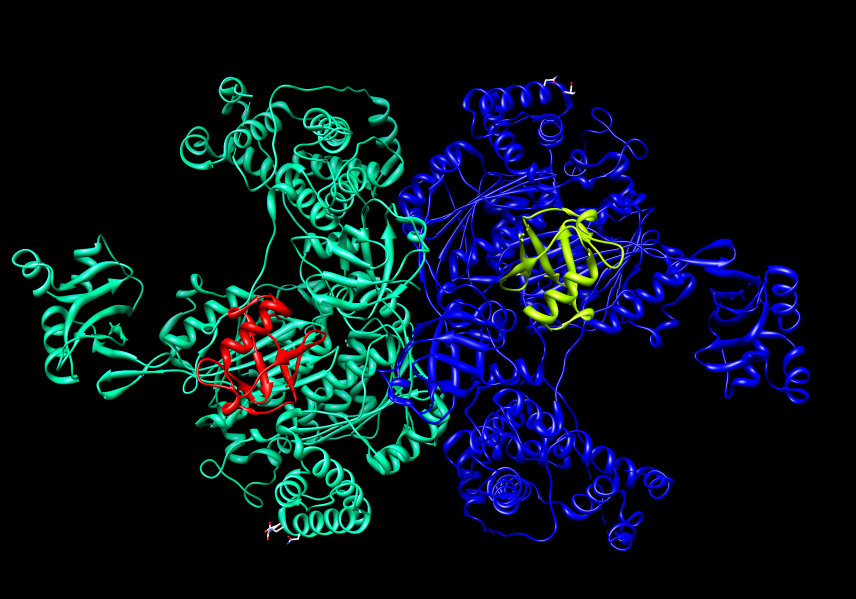
- Crystal structure of the yeast ubiquitin-activating enzyme E1 / ubiquitin complex.

Identifiers
- EC no.: 6.2.1.45
- CAS no.: 74812-49-0
- Alt. names: E1 enzymes

Databases
- IntEnz: IntEnz view
- BRENDA: BRENDA entry
- ExPASy: NiceZyme view
- KEGG: KEGG entry
- MetaCyc: metabolic pathway
- PRIAM: profile
- PDB structures: RCSB PDB PDBe PDBsum
- Gene Ontology: AmiGO / QuickGO
Search
- PMC: articles
- PubMed: articles
- NCBI: proteins

Ubiquitin-activating enzymes, also known as E1 enzymes, catalyze the first step in the ubiquitination reaction, which (among other things) can target a protein for degradation via a proteasome. This covalent bond of ubiquitin or ubiquitin-like proteins to targeted proteins is a major mechanism for regulating protein function in eukaryotic organisms. Many processes such as cell division, immune responses and embryonic development are also regulated by post-translational modification by ubiquitin and ubiquitin-like proteins.

== Ubiquitination (ubiquitylation) ==
Ubiquitin-activating enzyme (E1) starts the ubiquitination process (Figure 1). The E1 enzyme, along with ATP, binds to the ubiquitin protein. The E1 enzyme then passes the ubiquitin protein to a second protein, called ubiquitin carrier or conjugation protein (E2). The E2 protein complexes with a ubiquitin protein ligase (E3). This ubiquitin protein ligase recognizes which protein needs to be tagged and catalyzes the transfer of ubiquitin to that protein. This pathway repeats itself until the target protein has a full chain of ubiquitin attached to itself.

== Structure and mechanism ==
At the start of the ubiquitination cascade, the E1 enzyme (Figure 2) binds ATP-Mg^{2+} and ubiquitin and catalyses ubiquitin C-terminal acyl adenylation. In the next step a catalytic cysteine (Figure 3) on the E1 enzyme attacks the ubiquitin-AMP complex through acyl substitution, simultaneously creating a thioester bond and an AMP leaving group. Finally, the E1-ubiquitin complex transfers ubiquitin to an E2 enzyme through a transthioesterification reaction, in which an E2 catalytic cysteine attacks the backside of the E1-ubiquitin complex. However, the transthioesterification process is very complicated, as both E1 and E2 enzymes form an intermediate complex wherein both enzymes undergo a series of conformational changes in order to bind with one another.

Throughout this mechanism, the E1 enzyme is bound to two ubiquitin molecules. Although this secondary ubiquitin is similarly adenylated, it does not form the same thioester complex described previously. The function of the secondary ubiquitin remains largely unknown, however it is believed that it may facilitate conformational changes seen in the E1 enzyme during the transthioesterification process.

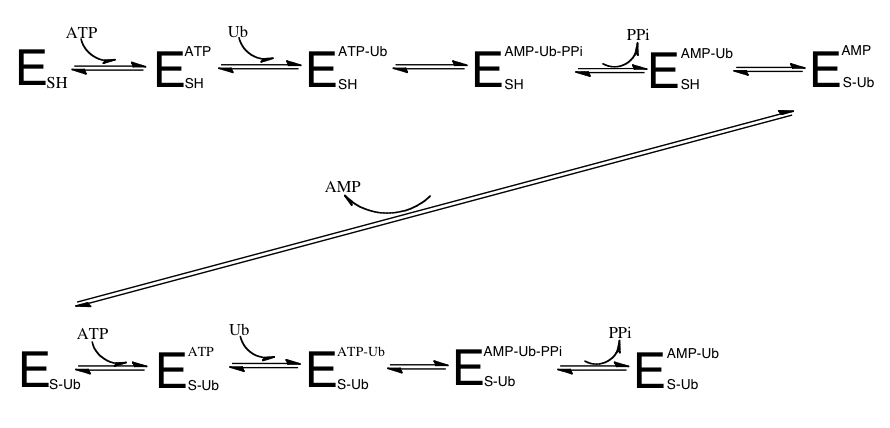
Figure 1. shows the sequence of how the ubiquitin activating enzyme attaches to ATP and the ubiquitin substrate. It also shows how two ubiquitin substrates can be bound at one time.

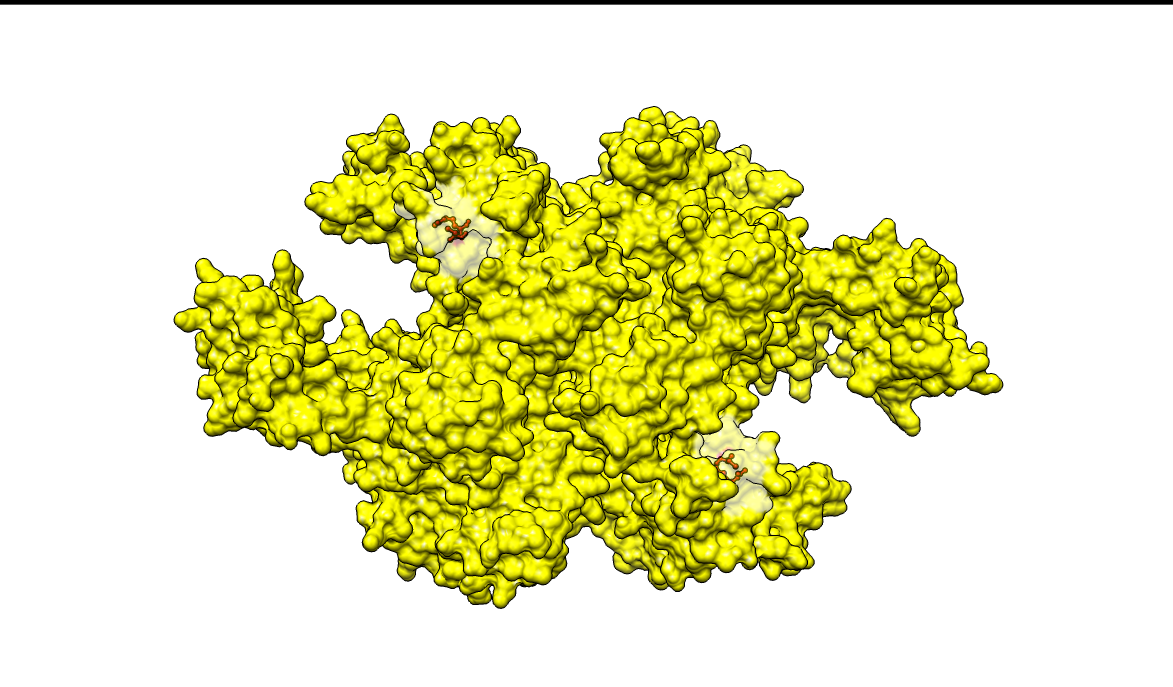
Figure 2. E1 protein binds a molecule of ubiquitin in each of two identical active sites (highlighted). The important residues, Cysteine and Arginine, are labeled in red.

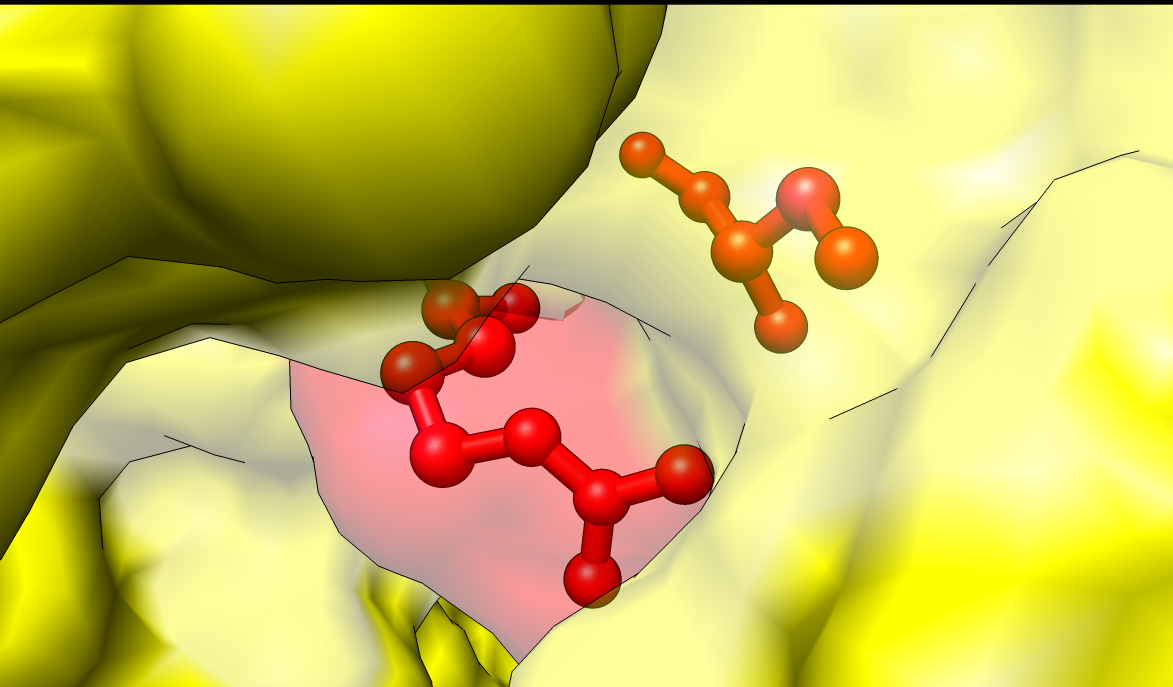
Figure 3. Close-up view of the unbound active site. Arg (603) is believed to recharge the catalytic Cys (600) once ubiquitin has been transferred to the E2 enzyme.

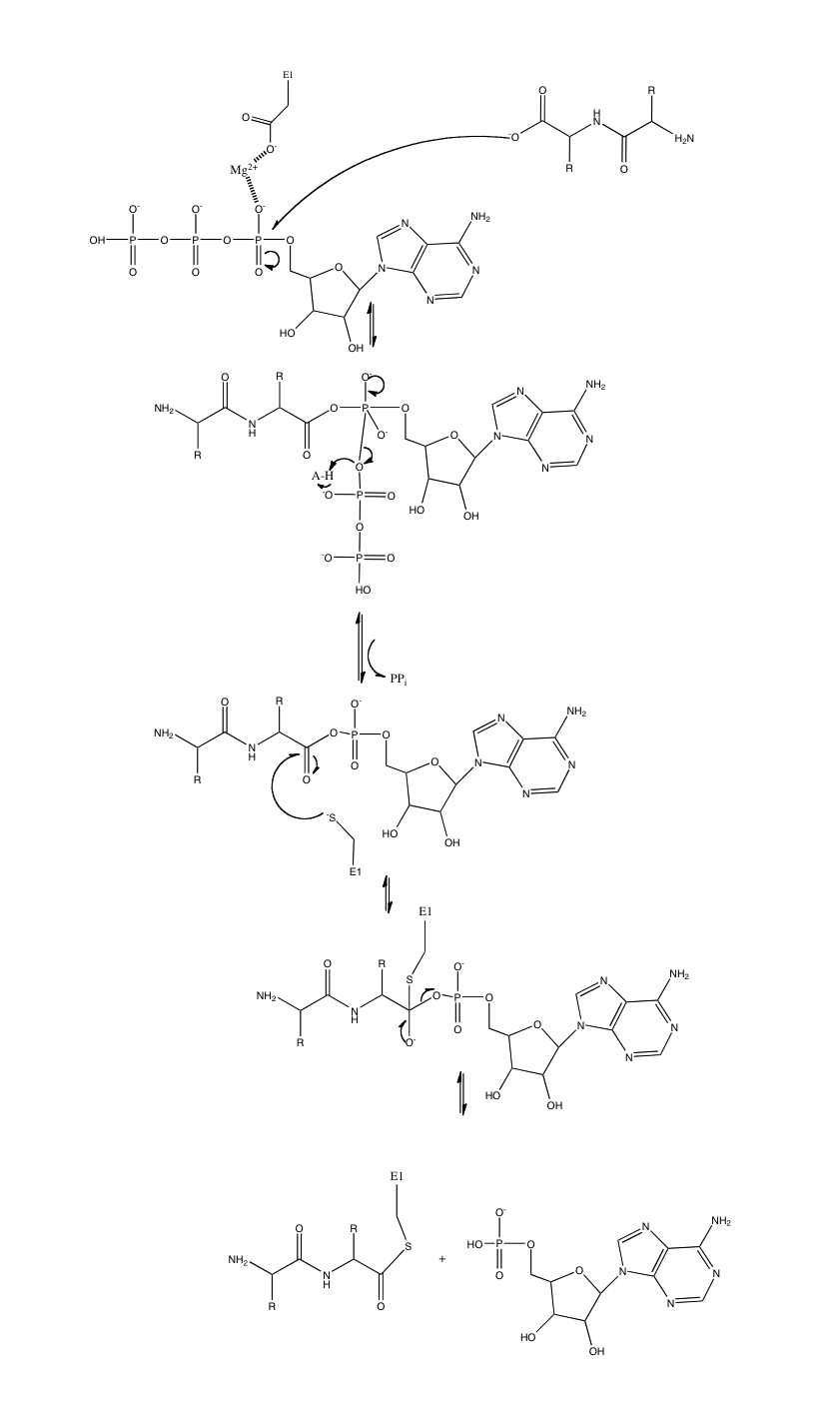
Figure 4. Full mechanism for adenylation of ubiquitin and subsequent ubiquitin binding to E1.

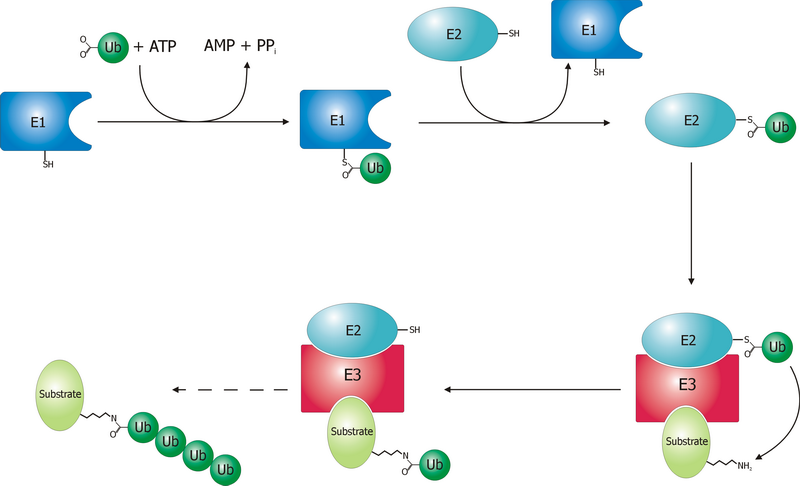
Schematic diagram of the ubiquitylation system.

== Isozymes ==
The following genes encode ubiquitin-activating enzymes:

- UBA1
- UBA2
- UBA3
- UBA5
- UBA6
- UBA7
- ATG7
- NAE1
- SAE1

== Disease association ==
The ubiquitin-proteasome system is critical to appropriate protein degradation within cells. Dysfunctions of this system can disrupt cellular homeostasis and lead to a host of disorders. In normally functioning cells, the covalent linkage of ubiquitin or ubiquitin-like protein to a target protein changes the target protein's surface. These ubiquitinated proteins are subject to degradation by proteolytic and non-proteolytic pathways. If this system malfunctions, numerous inherited and acquired diseases may result, such as cancer, diabetes, stroke, Alzheimer's disease, amyotrophic lateral sclerosis, multiple sclerosis, asthma, inflammatory bowel disease, autoimmune thyroiditis, inflammatory arthritis, lupus, and VEXAS syndrome.

== Missense in UBE1 and X-linked infantile spinal muscular atrophy (XL-SMA) ==
Among the various disorders associated with the ubiquitin-proteasome pathway is X-linked infantile spinal muscular atrophy (XL-SMA). The fatal childhood disorder is associated with loss of anterior horn cells and infantile death. Clinical features include hypotonia, areflexia, and multiple congenital contractures. In a large-scale mutation analysis, screening of six XL-SMA families provided results indicating two novel missense mutations in two families and a novel synonymous C→T substitution in another three families. All of these detected mutations were located in exon 15 of the UBE1 gene (the gene encoding ubiquitin-activating enzyme) and were observed to segregate with disease in the families. In brevity, UBE1 missense may lead to a disturbed complex building with gigaxonin, a protein involved in axonal structure and neuronal maintenance. This can lead to impaired degradation of microtubule-associated protein 1B (MAP1B), resulting in the build-up of MAP1B protein, which may enhance neuronal cell death. Thus, mutations in UBE1 are suspected to be the cause of genetic defects in XL-SMA individuals.
