= DNA replication stress =

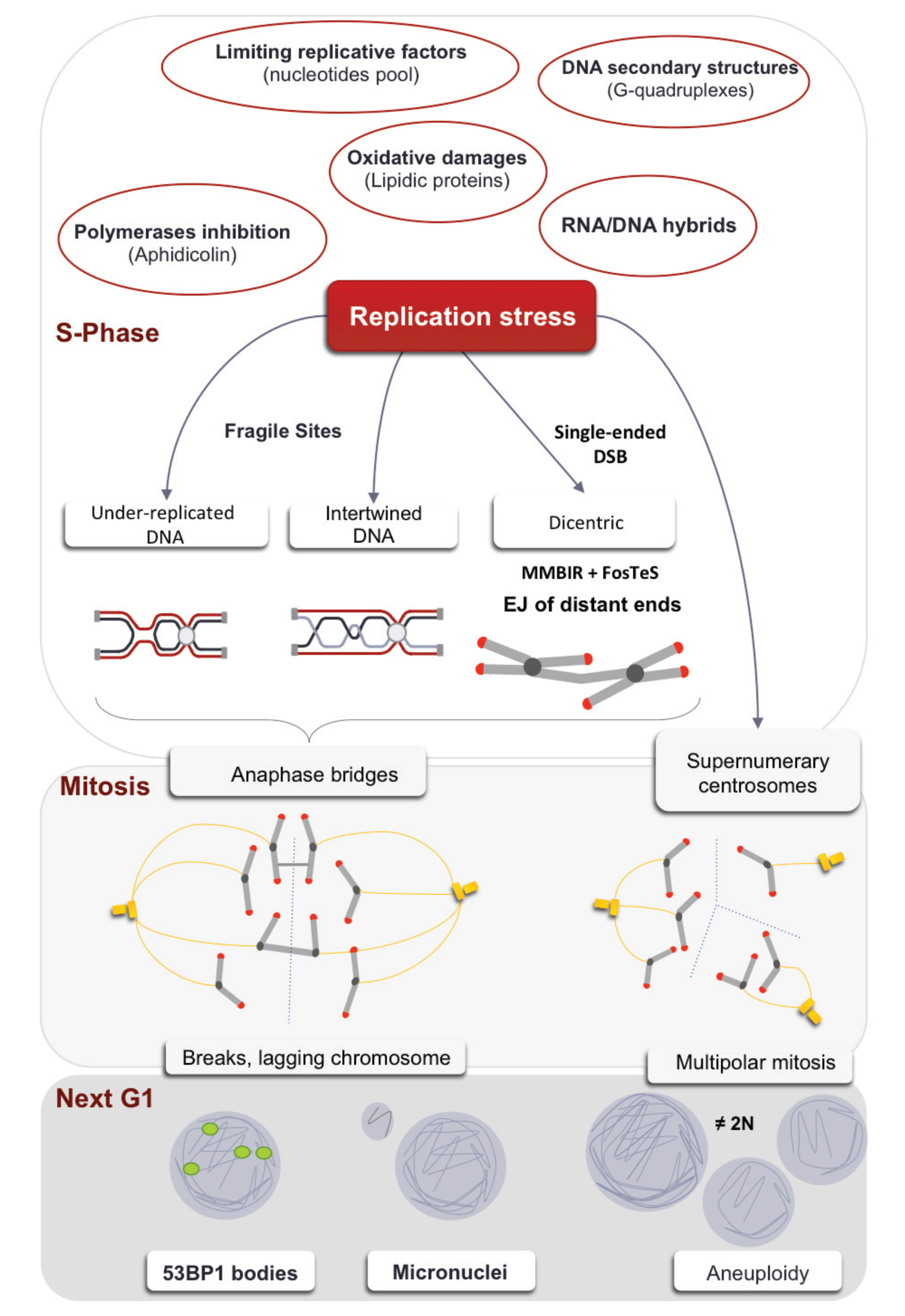
Replication stress and its consequences in mitosis

DNA replication stress refers to the state of a cell whose genome is exposed to various stresses. The events that contribute to replication stress occur during DNA replication, and can result in a stalled replication fork.

There are many events that contribute to replication stress, including:

- Misincorporation of ribonucleotides
- Unusual DNA structures
- Conflicts between replication and transcription
- Insufficiency of essential replication factors
- Common fragile sites
- Overexpression or constitutive activation of oncogenes
- Chromatin inaccessibility

ATM and ATR are proteins that help to alleviate replication stress. Specifically, they are kinases that are recruited and activated by DNA damage. The stalled replication fork can collapse if these regulatory proteins fail to stabilize it. When this occurs, reassembly of the fork is initiated in order to repair the damaged DNA end.

== Replication fork ==
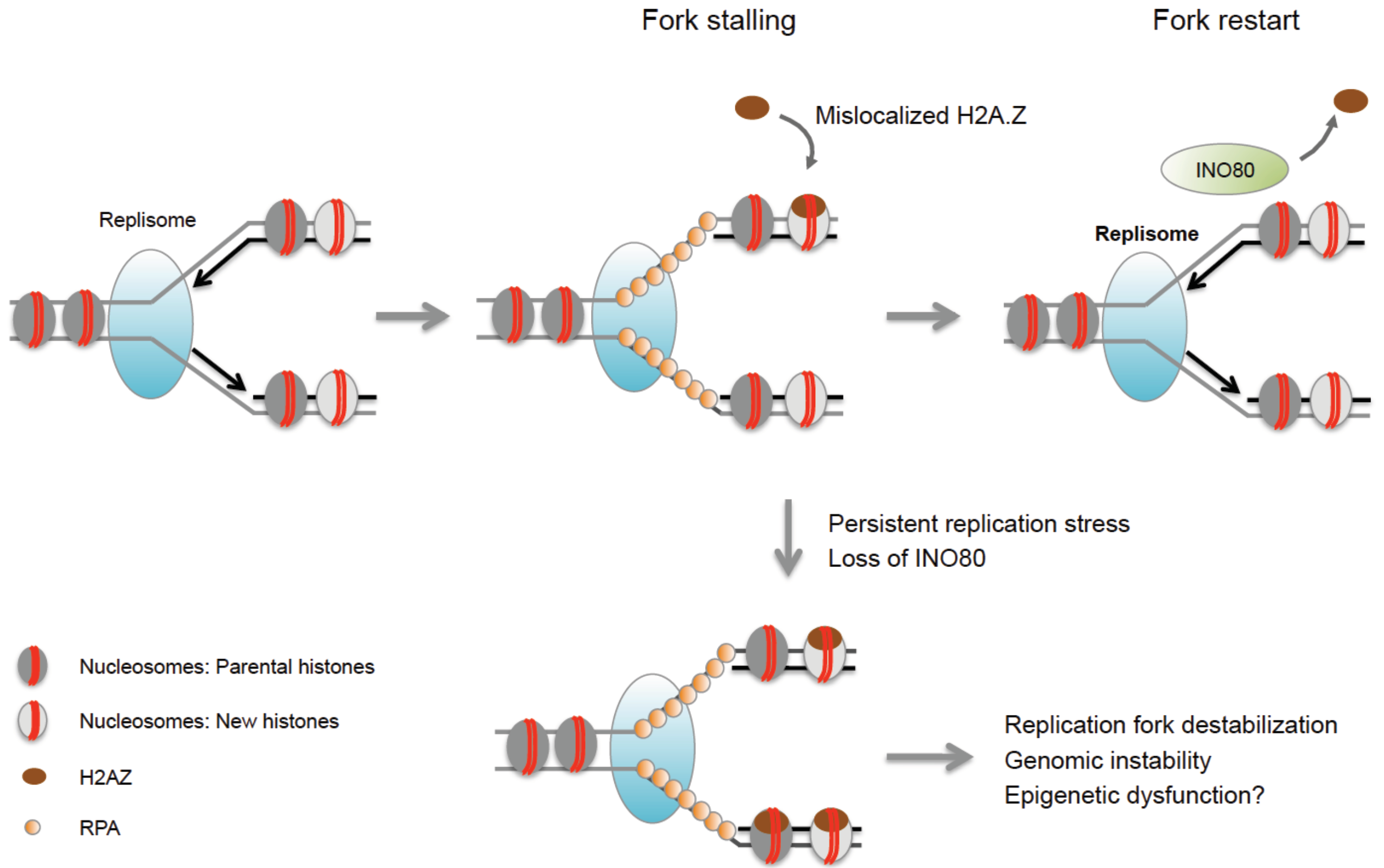
INO80 stabilizes replication forks and counteracts mislocalization of H2A.Z

The replication fork consists of a group of proteins that influence the activity of DNA replication. In order for the replication fork to stall, the cell must possess a certain number of stalled forks and arrest length. The replication fork is specifically paused due to the stalling of helicase and polymerase activity, which are linked together. In this situation, the fork protection complex (FPC) is recruited to help maintain this linkage.

In addition to stalling and maintaining the fork structure, protein phosphorylation can also create a signal cascade for replication restart. The protein Mrc1, which is part of the FPC, transmits the checkpoint signal by interacting with kinases throughout the cascade. When there is a loss of these kinases (from replication stress), an excess of ssDNA is produced, which is necessary for the restarting of replication.

== Replication block removal ==
DNA interstrand cross-links (ICLs) cause replication stress by blocking replication fork progression. This blockage leads to failure of DNA strand separation and a stalled replication fork. Repair of ICLs can be accomplished by sequential incisions, and homologous recombination. In vertebrate cells, replication of an ICL-containing chromatin template triggers recruitment of more than 90 DNA repair and genome maintenance factors. Analysis of the proteins recruited to stalled replication forks revealed a specific set of DNA repair factors involved in the replication stress response. Among these proteins, SLF1 and SLF2 were found to physically link the SMC5/6 DNA repair protein complex to RAD18. The SMC5/6 complex is employed in homologous recombination, and its linkage to RAD18 likely allows recruitment of SMC5/6 to ubiquitination products at sites of DNA damage.

=== Replication-coupled repair ===
Mechanisms that process damaged DNA in coordination with the replisome in order to maintain replication fork progression are considered to be examples of replication-coupled repair. In addition to the repair of DNA interstrand crosslinks, indicated above, multiple DNA repair processes operating in overlapping layers can be recruited to faulty sites depending on the nature and location of the damage. These repair processes include (1) removal of misincorporated bases; (2) removal of misincorporated ribonucleotides; (3) removal of damaged bases (e.g. oxidized or methylated bases) that block the replication polymerase; (4) removal of DNA-protein crosslinks; and (5) removal of double-strand breaks. Such repair pathways can function to protect stalled replication forks from degradation and allow restart of broken forks, but when deficient can cause replication stress.

=== Single-strand break repair ===
Singe-strand breaks are one of the most common forms of endogenous DNA damage. Replication fork collapse at leading strand nicks generates resected single-ended double-strand breaks that can be repaired by homologous recombination.

== Causation ==
Replication stress is induced from various endogenous and exogenous stresses, which are regularly introduced to the genome. These stresses include, but are not limited to, DNA damage, excessive compacting of chromatin (preventing replisome access), over-expression of oncogenes, or difficult-to-replicate genome structures. Replication stress can lead to genome instability, cancer, and ageing. Uncoordinated replication–transcription conflicts and unscheduled R-loop accumulation are significant contributors.

=== Specific events ===
The events that lead to genome instability occur in the cell cycle prior to mitosis, specifically in the S phase. Disturbance to this phase can generate negative effects, such as inaccurate chromosomal segregation, for the upcoming mitotic phase. The two processes that are responsible for damage to the S phase are oncogenic activation and tumor suppressor inactivation. They have both been shown to speed up the transition from the G1 phase to the S phase, leading to inadequate amounts of DNA replication components. These losses can contribute to the DNA damage response (DDR). Replication stress can be an indicative characteristic for carcinogenesis, which typically lacks DNA repair systems. A physiologically short duration of the G1 phase is also typical of fast replicating progenitors during early embryonic development.

== Applications in cancer ==
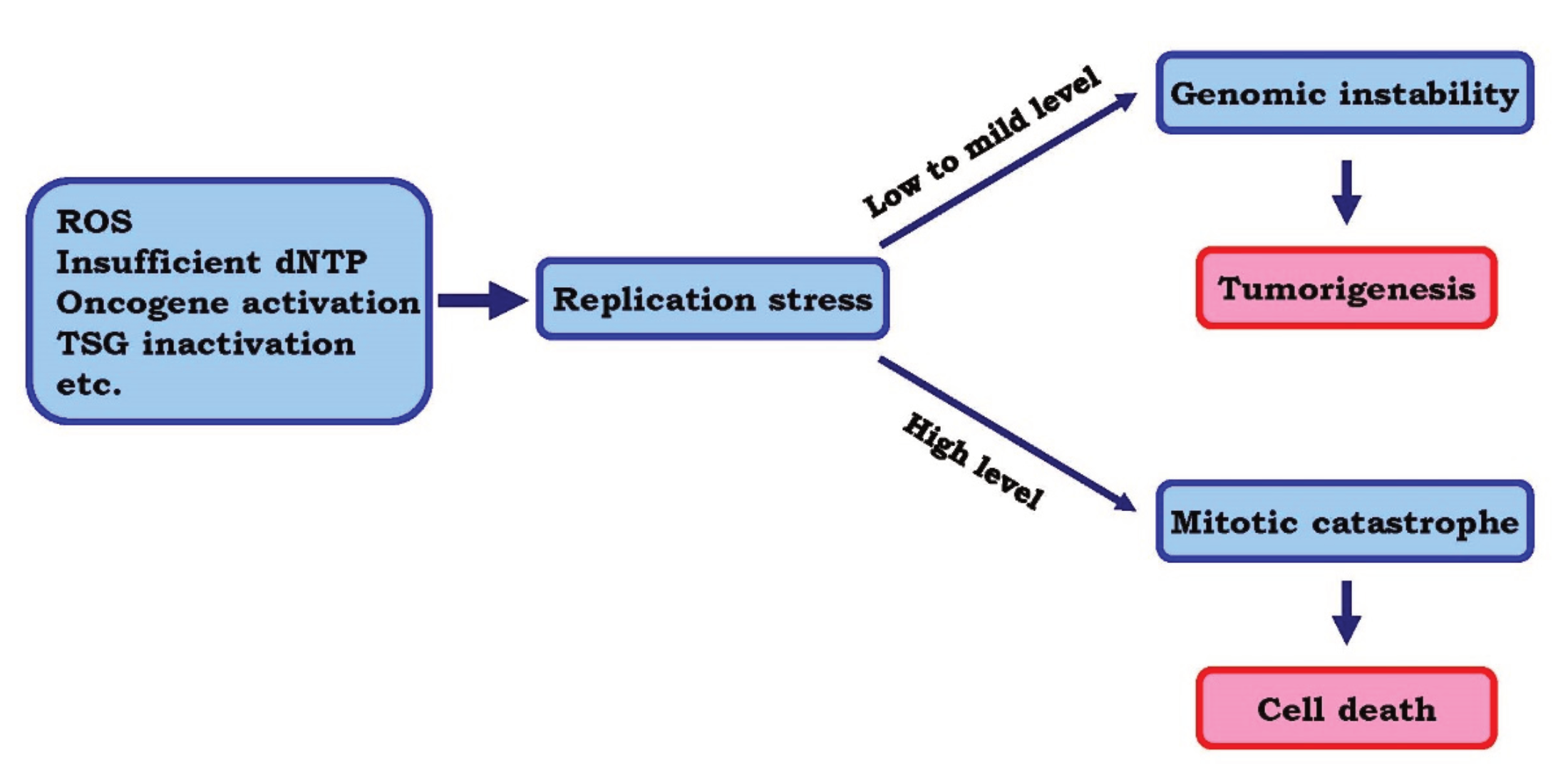
Rationale for enhancing replication stress to kill cancer cells

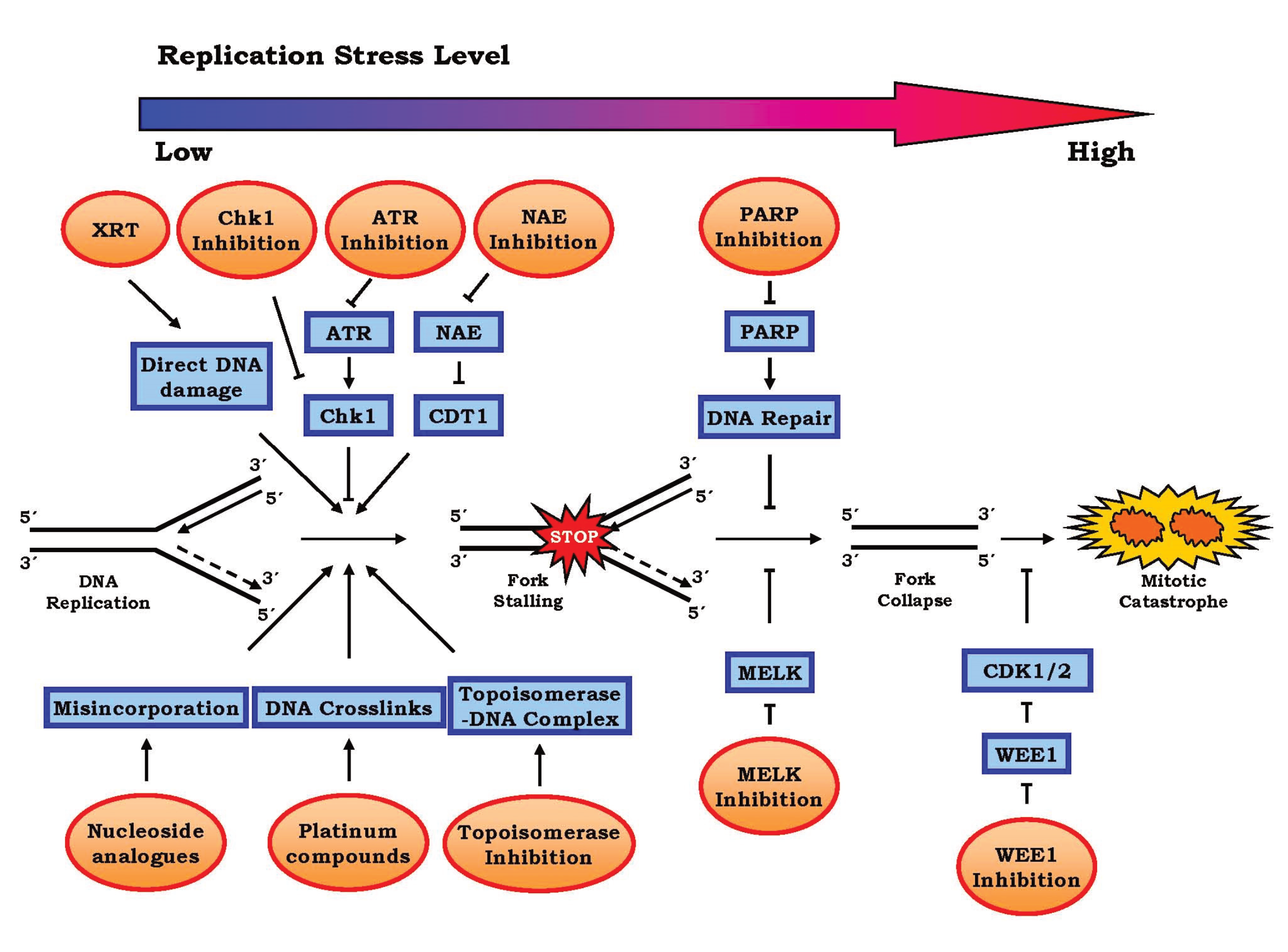
Illustration of various approaches to target replication stress for cancer treatment

Normal replication stress occurs at low to mild levels and induces genomic instability, which can lead to tumorigenesis and cancer progression. However, high levels of replication stress have been shown to kill cancer cells.

In one study, researchers sought to determine the effects of inducing high levels of replication stress on cancer cells. The results showed that with further loss of checkpoints, replication stress is increased to a higher level. With this change, the DNA replication of cancer cells may be incomplete or incorrect when entering into the mitotic phase, which can eventually result in cell death through mitotic catastrophe.

Another study examined how replication stress affected APOBEC3B activity. APOBEC3 (apolipoprotein B mRNA editing enzyme, catalytic polypeptide-like 3) has been seen to mutate the cancer genome in various cancer types. Results from this study show that weakening oncogenic signaling or intensifying DNA replication stress can alter carcinogenic potential, and can be manipulated therapeutically.
