= Family with sequence similarity 180A =

FAM180A Gene

FAM180A

Identifiers
- Aliases: FAM180A, UNQ1940, family with sequence similarity 180 member A
- External IDs: MGI: 3039626; HomoloGene: 18283; GeneCards: FAM180A; OMA:FAM180A - orthologs

Gene location (Human)
Chr.	Chromosome 7 (human)
Band	7q33	Start	135,728,348 bp
Band	7q33	End	135,748,813 bp

Gene location (Mouse)
Chr.	Chromosome 6 (mouse)
Band	6|6 B1	Start	35,289,603 bp
Band	6|6 B1	End	35,303,076 bp
RNA expression pattern
Bgee	Human / Mouse (ortholog); Top expressed in: ascending aorta; Descending thoracic aorta; gallbladder; stromal cell of endometrium; right coronary artery; apex of heart; popliteal artery; tibial arteries; right lobe of liver; left coronary artery / Top expressed in: facial skeleton; left lobe of liver; jaw; lower jaw; right lobe of liver; mandible; rib; upper jaw; nucleus pulposus; embryo; More reference expression data
BioGPS	n/a
Orthologs
Species	Human	Mouse
Entrez	389558	208164
Ensembl	ENSG00000189320	ENSMUSG00000047420
UniProt	Q6UWF9	Q8BR21
RefSeq (mRNA)	NM_205855; NM_001369697	NM_173375
RefSeq (protein)	NP_995327; NP_001356626	NP_775551
Location (UCSC)	Chr 7: 135.73 – 135.75 Mb	Chr 6: 35.29 – 35.3 Mb
PubMed search
- Wikidata
View/Edit Human	View/Edit Mouse

Family with sequence similarity 180 member A (FAM180A) is a protein, which in humans is encoded by the FAM180A gene. This protein is primarily found in the heart, liver, and kidneys.

== Molecular features ==
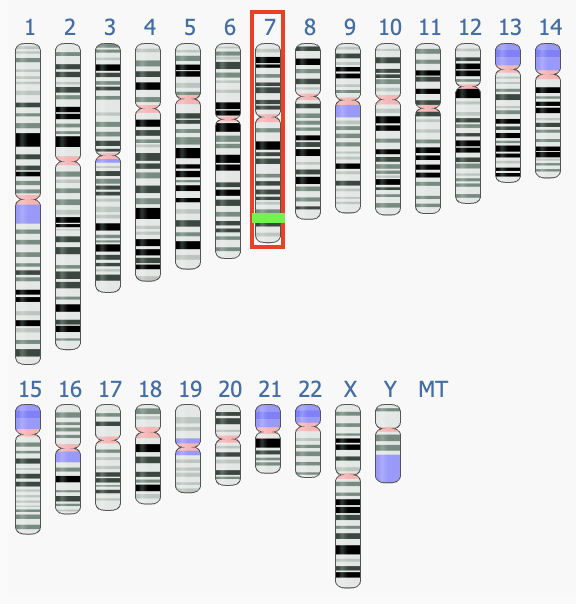
Location of Fam180A gene in human (Homo sapiens) genome.

=== Gene ===
In the human genome, FAM180A is located on the minus strand of Chromosome 7, at 7q33 and has 3 exons in the sequence. The gene spans 19,222 base pairs. FAM180A is also known as UNQ1940.

==== Expression ====
The expression of the FAM180A mRNA is exceedingly high in the heart, followed by heightened expression in the kidneys and liver. However, in all other tissues, the expression of this gene's mRNA is low. Similar expression levels were found in the ortholog, mouse (Mus musculus).

=== mRNA ===
The mRNA has 1774 nucleotides. Only one known isoform of FAM180A exists, known as FAM180A transcript variant 2 (TV2). The TV2 contains 5,138 nucleotides (Accession Number: NM_001369697.2).

=== Protein ===
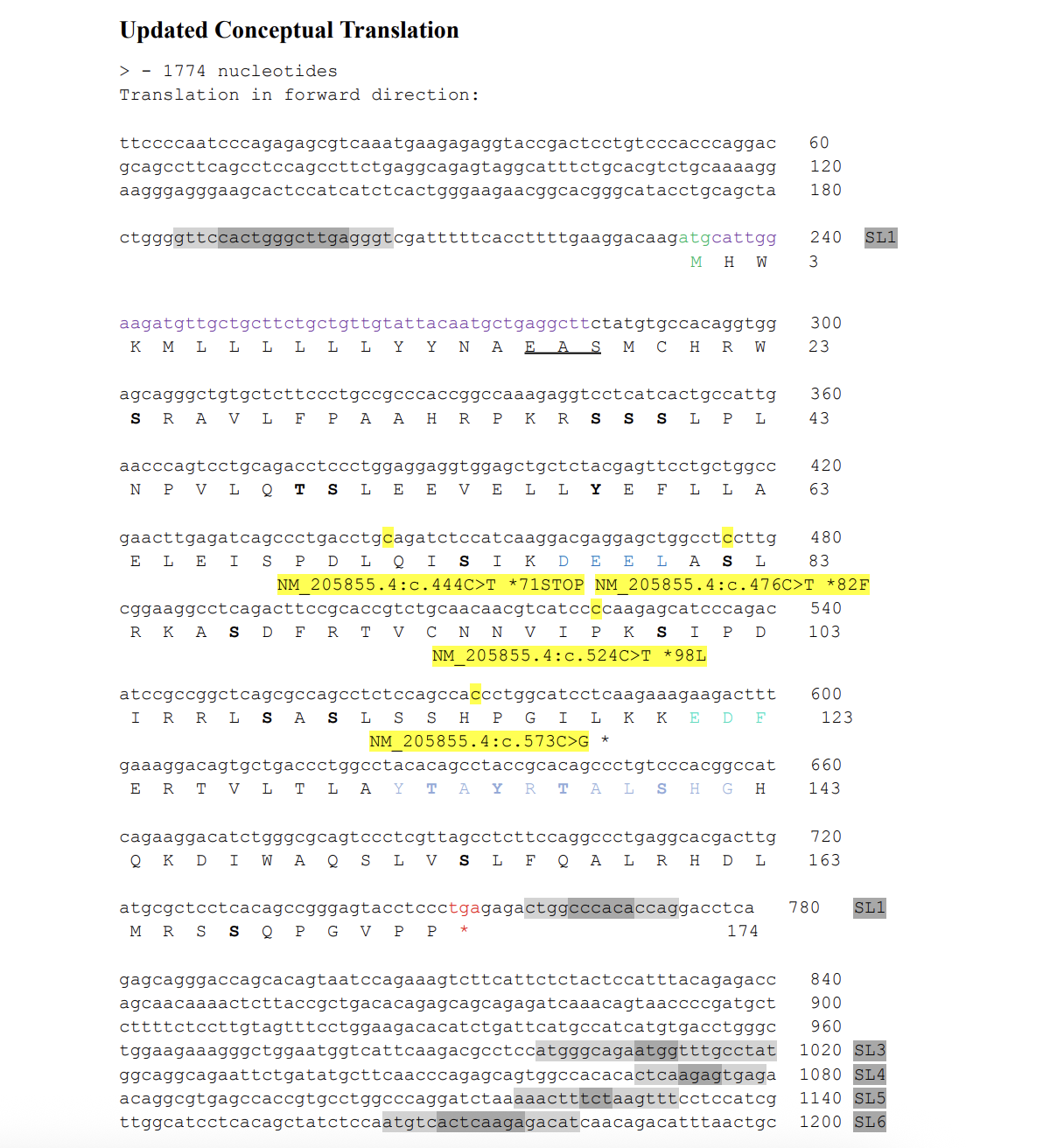
Conceptual Translation of FAM180A.

The FAM180A protein contains 173 amino acids. a signal peptide, mature peptide, and a regulatory site. A molecular weight of about 19733 kD (kilodaltons). Human FAM180A is neutral at a pH of 8.59. The protein contains a Domain of Unknown Function (DUF3326), located from 15-77 AA.

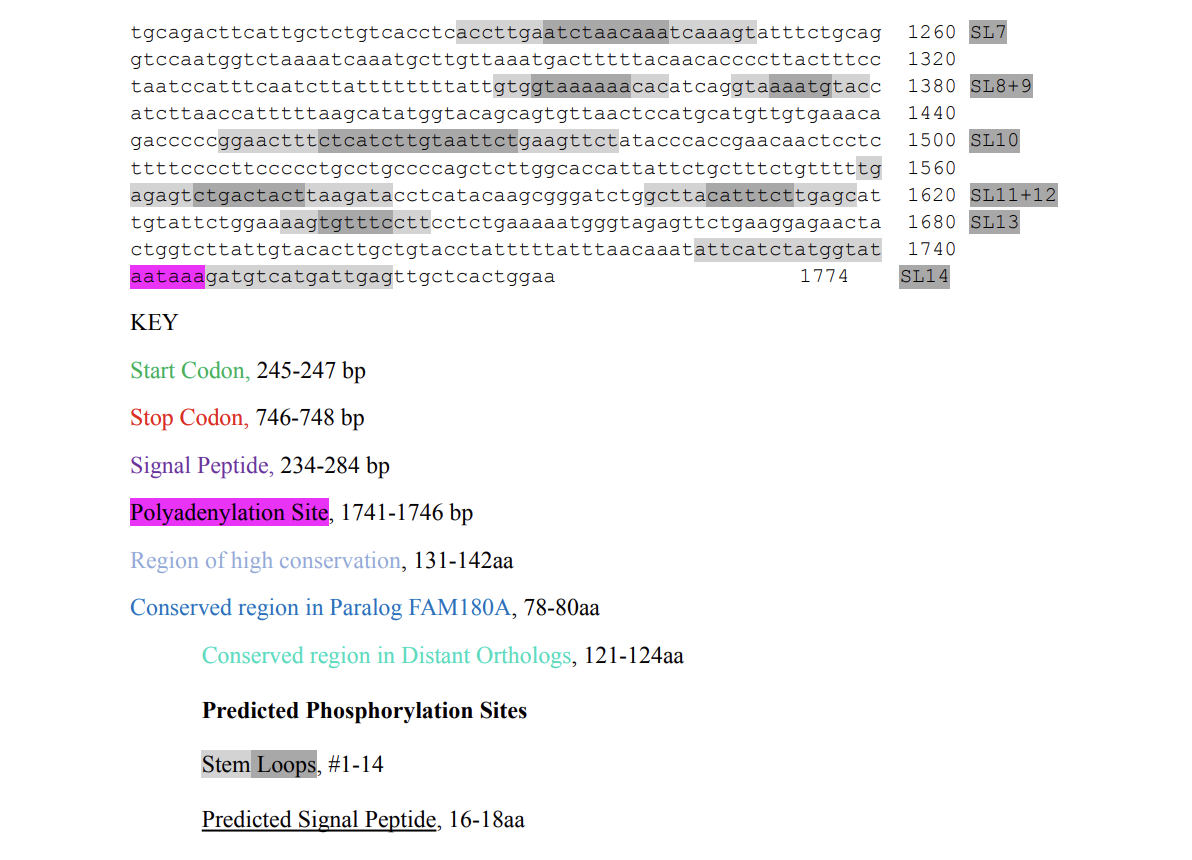
Conceptual Translation of FAM180A continued.

FAM180A protein contains significantly lower levels of Glycine. Glycine was two standard deviations less than the average amount of Glycine present in the typical human protein. Additionally, Leucine was one standard deviation above the average amount of Leucine in a typical human protein. Compositional analysis was run with Mouse (Mus musculus) and Chicken (Gallus gallus) orthologs where Glycine remained consistently low, while Leucine counts remained high.

==== Subcellular localization ====
The FAM180A protein was highly localized in the extracellular region and Golgi Apparatus. The proteins predicted to interact with FAM180A were also highly localized in the extracellular region.

===== Post translational modifications =====
There is a high likelihood of a signal peptide located including a six-leucine chain and adjacent Amino acids at the beginning of the protein (1-18AA). PSORT predicted a possible cleavable signal peptide from 1-17AA. Only one potential cleavage site was predicted from amino acids 16-18. The single site had a probability of 0.961 out of 1.000. The mass of FAM180A post-cut and the cleavage site is 17628 kD (kilodaltons) and the new pH is 8.64.

==== Interacting proteins ====
Abbreviated Name	Name	Protein Job
C17orf67	Chromosome 17 open reading frame 67	Enables protein binding.
COL28A1	Collagen alpha-1(XXVIII) chain	Cell binding protein.
GLT6D1	Glycosyltransferase 6 domain containing 1	Enables transferase activity.
PI15	Peptidase inhibitor 15	Facial patterning during embryonic development.
GCC2	GRIP and coiled-coil domain-containing protein 2	Enables protein binding, GTPase binding.
ANKS1A	Ankyrin repeat and SAM domain-containing protein 1A	Regulates EPHA8 receptor tyrosine kinase signaling to control cell migration and neurite retraction.
KLHL35	Kelch-like protein 35	Enables ubiquitin-like ligase-substrate adaptor activity.
TCP11	T-complex protein 11 homolog	Plays a role in the process of sperm capacitation and acrosome reactions.
FANCE	Fanconi anemia group E protein	Required for the nuclear accumulation of FANCC and provides a critical bridge between the FA complex and FANCD2.
SLC25A29	Mitochondrial basic amino acids transporter	Transports arginine, lysine, homoarginine, methylarginine and, to a much lesser extent, ornithine and histidine.

Table 1: Proteins predicted to interact with FAM180A (Homo sapiens) protein. All interacting proteins were localized in the extracellular region or Golgi apparatus. All interacting proteins were found via textmining where research papers link genes based on similar cellular location or expression.

== Homologs ==
=== Orthologs ===
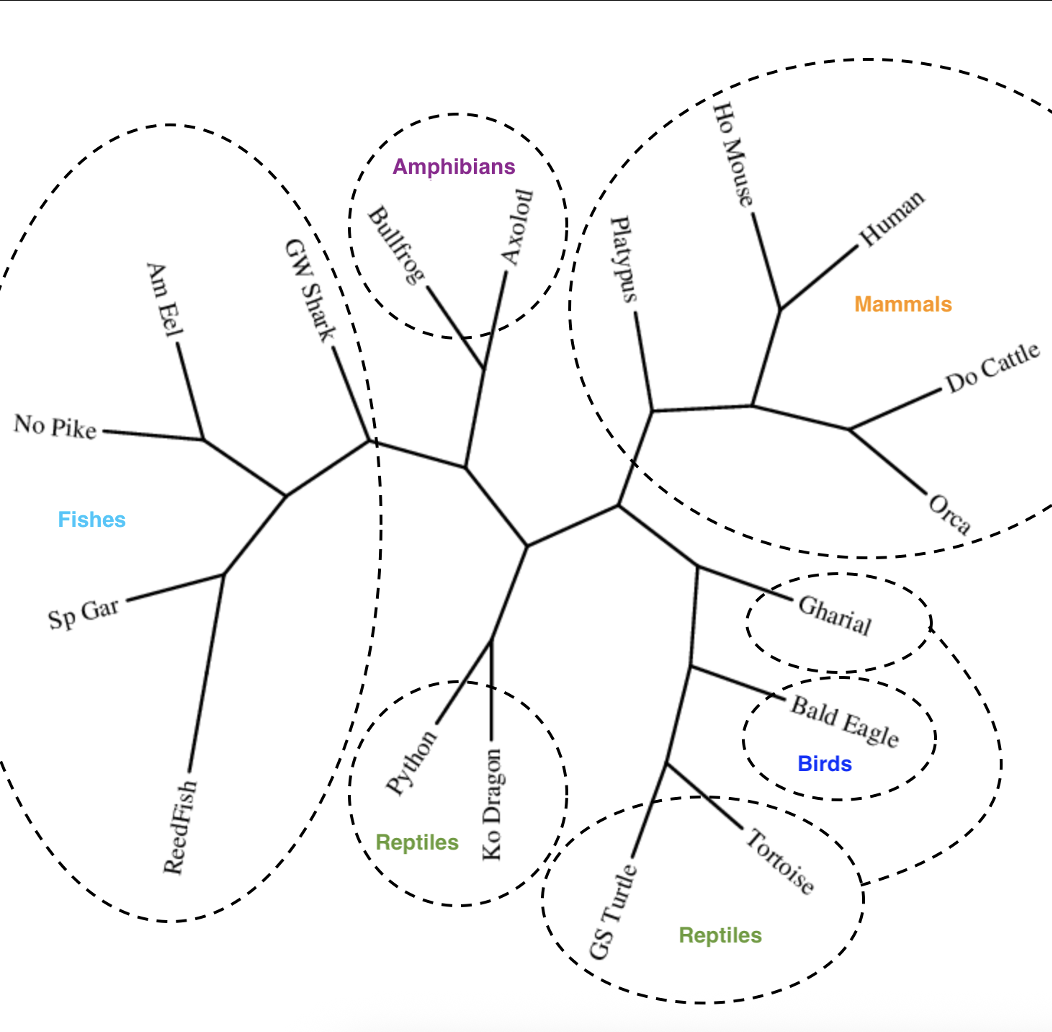
Figure 3: Guide tree of 18 selected orthologs of FAM180A.

Orthologs for the FAM180A gene are evolutionarily tied back to cartilaginous fishes.

In humans and chimpanzees, FAM180A is expressed the most in the heart, liver, and kidneys. Unlike the heart, the liver and kidneys are consistently expressed across a wider range of organisms. According to Uniprot, the FAM180A protein is secreted outside of the cell membrane.

Reptiles were split in Figure 3 due to differing evolutionary branches. The Python and Ko Dragon are part of the taxonomic group Lepidosauria, whereas birds, turtles and crocodilians follow a separate branch.

	Genus Species	Common Name	Taxonomic Group	Date of Divergence	Accession Number	Sequence Length (aa)	Sequence Identity to Human FAM180A	Sequence Similarity to Human FAM180A
Mammals	Homo sapiens	Humans	Primates	0 MYA	NP_995327.1	173	100.0%	100.0%
Mammals	Mus musculus	House mouse	Rodentia	87 MYA	NP_775551.1	173	78.6%	87.3%
Mammals	Bos taurus	Cattle	Artiodactyls	94 MYA	XP_002687015.2	173	83.8%	92.5%
Mammals	Orcinus orca	Orca	Artiodactyls	94 MYA	XP_004272298.1	173	85.5%	92.5%
Mammals	Ornithorhynchus anatinus	Platypus	Monotreme	180 MYA	XP_001512643.1	173	75.1%	85.5%
Birds	Haliaeetus leucocephalus	Bald eagle	Accipitriformes	319 MYA	XP_010564551.1	172	65.7%	80.6%
Birds	Taeniopygia guttata	Zebra finch	Passeriformes	319 MYA	XP_072779629.1	179	53.5%	63.1%
Birds	Meleagris gallopavo	Wild turkey	Galliformes	319 MYA	XP_010712878.1	146	55.6%	66.9%
Reptiles	Gopherus flavomarginatus	Bolson tortoise	Testudines	319 MYA	XP_050775007.1	174	64.2%	79.0%
Reptiles	Chelonia mydas	Green sea turtle	Testudines	319 MYA	XP_007072368.1	174	64.2%	79.0%
Reptiles	Gavialis gangeticus	Gharial	Crododillia	319 MYA	XP_019370992.1	171	55.2%	65.1%
Reptiles	Crocodylus porosus	Australian saltwater crododile	Crododillia	319 MYA	XP_019400203.1	173	65.2%	78.7%
Reptiles	Varanus komodoensis	Komodo dragon	Squamata	319 MYA	XP_044290164.1	176	64.4%	80.2%
Reptiles	Python bivittatus	Burmese python	Squamata	319 MYA	XP_007431419.1	176	61.8%	75.8%
Amphibians	Aquarana catesbeiana	American bullfrog	Anura	352 MYA	XP_073477904.1	204	42.9%	57.6%
Amphibians	Ambystoma mexicanum	Axolotl	Urodela	352 MYA	XP_069484866.1	236	44.3%	54.9%
Fishes	Erpetoichthys calabaricus	Reedfish	Polypteriformes	429 MYA	XP_028647364.1	163	41.0%	59.5%
Fishes	Esox lucius	Northern pike	Salmoniformes	429 MYA	NP_001291030.1	183	36.2%	52.3%
Fishes	Lepisosteus oculatus	Spotted gar	Lepisosteiformes	429 MYA	XP_015208634.1	163	45.1%	64.0%
Fishes	Anguilla rostrata	American eel	Anguilliformes	429 MYA	XP_064199015.1	170	41.4%	59.7%
Fishes	Carcharodon carcharias	Great white shark	Mackerel Sharks	462 MYA	XP_041071418.1	166	49.1%	65.7%

Table 2: Spreadsheet of 20 orthologs of the FAM180A protein. Sequence Identity and Similarity ran by ClustalW. Date of Divergence calculated by TimeTree.

=== Paralogs ===
FAM180A has one known paralog, referred to as Family With Sequence Similarity 180B (FAM180B). FAM180B is associated with Leprosy which is a chronic bacterial infection which attacks the skin and peripheral nervous system. FAM180B is primarily expressed in the skin and has been identified as a genetic factor, influencing the susceptibility to Leprosy as is differentiated in skin lesions. FAM180B is also associated with Mosaic Variegated Aneuploidy Syndrome (MVA) which is caused by an improper division of chromosomes leading to a plethora or abnormalities in body functionality. Abnormal FAM180B expression was reported to increase the chances of acquiring MVA syndrome though less common than other genetic indicators (BUB1B and CEP57). FAM180B is similarly found in the extracellular matrix with trace presence in the cytosol

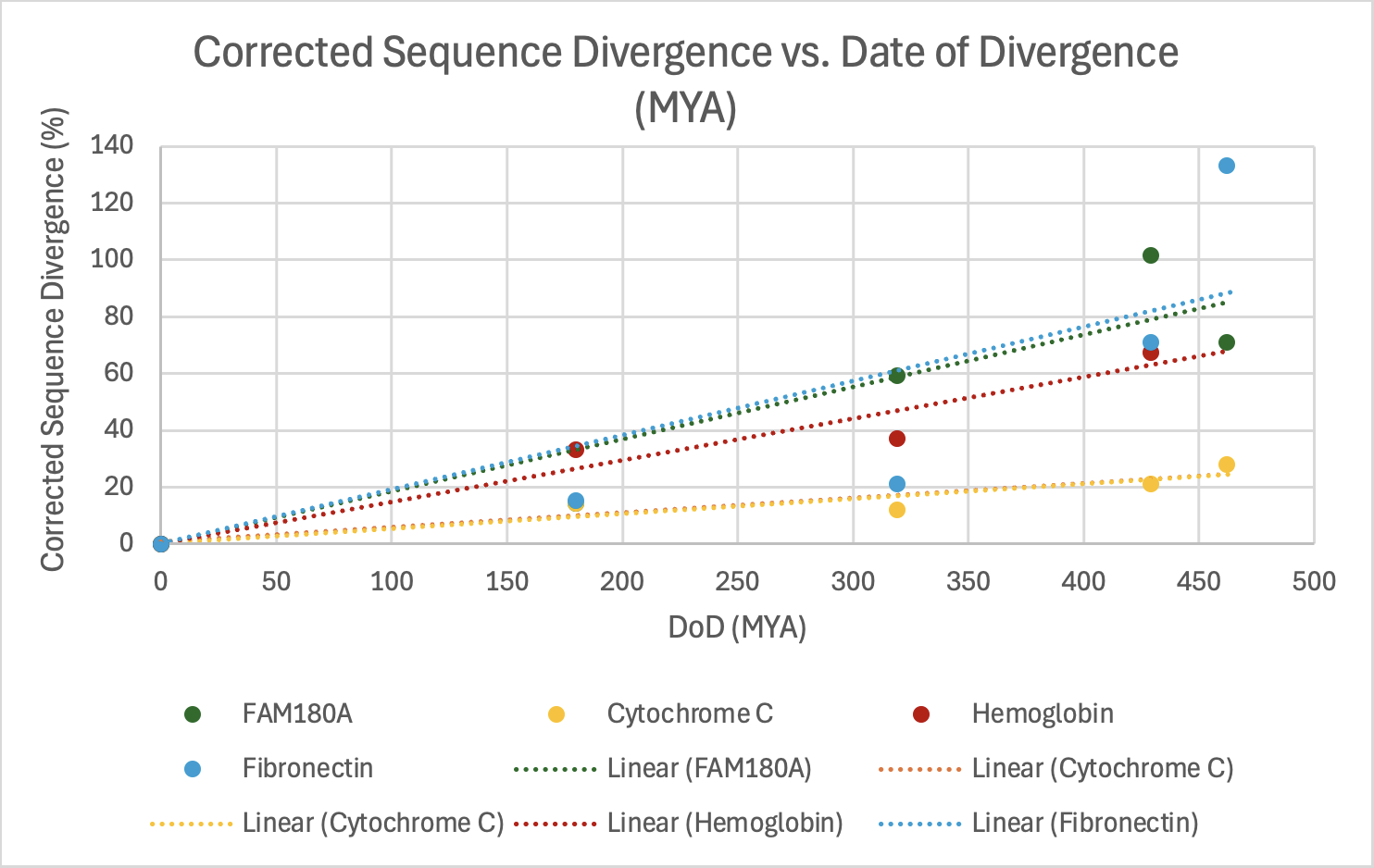
Scatterplot of FAM180A, Cytochrome C, Hemoglobin, and Fibronectin from distant orthologs.

== Clinical significance ==
There is no direct connection between the FAM180A gene and any disease. Expression/association datasets often connect FAM180A to Fibro-sarcomatous osteosarcoma, chondroblastic osteosarcoma and bone osteosarcoma. The FAM180A gene has significantly greater expression rates in adult mesenchymal stem cells (MSCs) at both the mRNA and protein level compared to fetal mesenchymal stem cells (MSCs). RNA isolation was performed on collected proteins from cultured MSC. RNA libraries were generated and sequenced by computer where the presence of FAM180A was found. FAM180A was involved in an expression/association study as a potential bladder cancer indicator. Seven genes were found to be up-regulated in human bladder cancer, FAM180A was of the seven genes. But FAM180A may not be directly associated with bladder cancer.

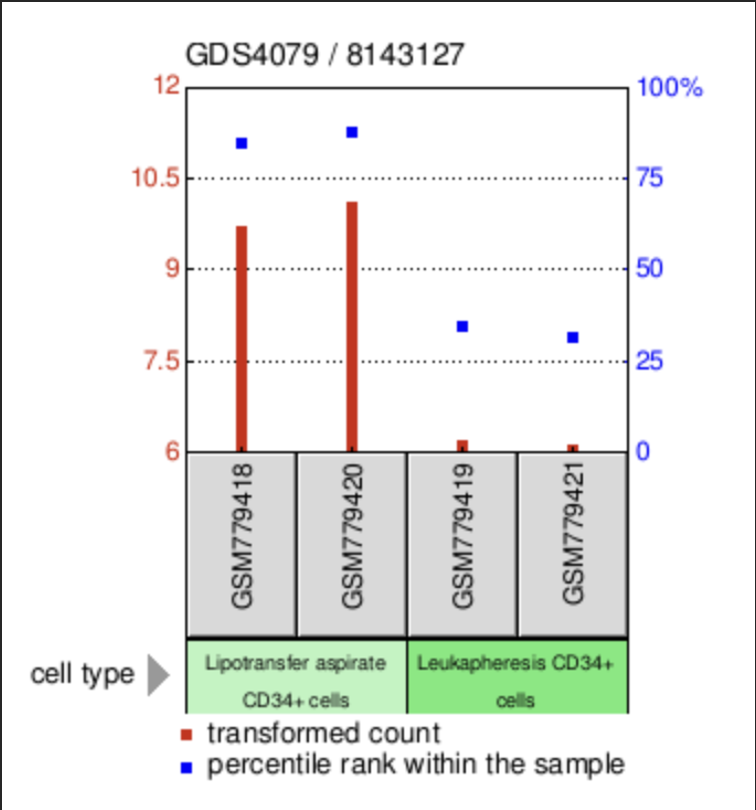
GEO profile (GDS4079 / 8143127) of breast lipo-transfer white adipose tissue CD34+ cells in Homo sapiens.

CD34+ cells were extracted by fat tissue that was harvested through liposuction (aspirate) and from white blood cells that were harvested from blood samples (leukapheresis). The CD34+ cells are Hematopoietic stem cells (HSC) which are cells that give rise to blood cell lineages. The CD34+ cells from adipose tissue had significantly higher expression levels of FAM180A than white blood cell CD34+ cells (refer to GEO profile figure). Adipose tissue groups had average ranks of 85–88. White blood cell groups had ranks of 32–35.
