= Mosaic variegated aneuploidy syndrome =

- Other names: MVA, Warburton-Anyane-Yeboa syndrome
- Photo of person and their karyotype, showing facial features (High forehead, midface hypoplasia, long philtrum, hypertelorism, epicanthal folds, short and wide nose, depressed nasal bridge). Karyotype shows trisomy of chromsome 17 and chromosome 8.
- Specialty: Medical genetics
- Symptoms: Peritoneal fluid excess, cataracts, Dandy-Walker malformation, epicanthus, glaucoma, small jaw, increased nuchal translucency, short stature, enlargement of ventricles in the brain
- Causes: genetic mutations
- Frequency: 1 per 1,000,000

Mosaic variegated aneuploidy syndrome is a rare autosomal recessive genetic disorder that causes inappropriate chromosomal segregation in mitosis process and because of it, some cells are aneuploid (mosaic). It is caused by mutation BUB1, BUB1B, BUB3, CEP57 or TRIP13.

Person with MVA can present with IUGR, microcephaly and a wide range of congenital abnormalities.

== Symptoms ==
Signs of this disease are:

Very frequent:

- Peritoneal fluid excess
- Cataracts
- Dandy-Walker malformation
- Epicanthus
- Glaucoma
- Micrognathia
- Increased nuchal translucency
- Short stature
- Ventriculomegaly

Frequent:

- Eye and vision abnormalities
- Global developmental delay
- Microcephaly
- Intellectual disability
- Triangular facies

Occasional:

- Anomalies of aortic morphology
- Anomalies of cardiovascular system morphology
- Lung lobation abnormality
- Abnormalities of skull
- Abnormality of immune system
- Anomalies of skin pigmentation
- Anomalies of the skeletal system
- Atypical genitalia
- Agenesis (or hypoplasia) of the cerebellum and the corpus callosum
- Sleep apnea
- Cleft palate
- 5th finger clinodactyly
- Tall forehead
- Hypothyroidism
- Wide nose
- Sloping forehead
- Some form of tumors, such as: Acute lymphoblastic leukemia, Nephroblastoma, Rhabdomyosarcoma.
- Depressed nasal ridge
- Down-slanting palpebral fissures
- Intrauterine growth restriction

== Cause ==
This disorder is caused by defect of genes that are responsible for spindle checkpoint.

Types include:

Genes that can cause MVA
Type	OMIM	Gene	Locus
MVA1	257300	BUB1B	15q15.1
MVA2	614114	CEP57	11q21
MVA3	617598	TRIP13	5p15
MVA4	620153	CENATAC	11q23
MVA5	620184	SLF2	10q24
MVA6	620185	SMC5	9q21

Also those genes are associated with that disorder: BUB3 and BUB1.

== Pathophysiology ==
BUB1, BUB1B and BUB3 participates in spindle checkpoint checkpoint process which is necessary for correct chromosome splitting process in mitosis, consequently mutation of those 3 genes causes incorrect splitting of chromosomes.

CENATAC gene is responsible for minor (U12‐dependent) spliceosome, which is important for cell cycle regulation proteins and in MVA, this process is deregulated.

CEP57 plays role in spindle pole integrity, which mutation can cause incorrect segregation during mitosis.

SLF2 and SMC5 are necessary for proper chromosomal segregation through centromeric and sister chromatid cohesion, consequently this mechanism is disrupted in this disease.

TRIP13 also participates in spindle checkpoint process by activating MAD2 and that activates spindle checkpoint and mutations in TRIP13 can cause MVA .

== Diagnosis ==
MVA can be suspected by phenotype and confirmed by karyotyping and genetic testing.

1. Karyotyping is a process where a person's chromosomes are isolated and ordered in numerical order. Consequently, it can be used to check for any chromosomal anomalies.
2. Genetic testing is a process when person's blood or other tissue gets inspected to determine changes in their genes.

== Prognosis ==
The prognosis of MVA syndrome depends on the types of malformation presented in the individual.

== History ==
The first mention of MVA was made by Rudd and colleagues in 1983, although Warburton and colleagues coined the name of MVA in 1991.

== Prevalence ==
The prevalence of MVA is 1/1,000,000.
