= RAD18 =

Protein-coding gene in the species Homo sapiens

Identifiers
- Aliases: RAD18, RNF73, E3 ubiquitin protein ligase, RAD18 E3 ubiquitin protein ligase
- External IDs: OMIM: 605256; MGI: 1890476; GeneCards: RAD18
Available structures
PDB	Ortholog search: PDBe RCSB
PDB	List of PDB id codes 2MRE, 2MRF, 2Y43, 2YBF
Enzyme activity
EC #	BRENDA	ExPASy	KEGG	MetaCyc
2.3.2.27	↗	↗	↗	↗

Gene location (Human)
Chr.	Chromosome 3 (human)
Band	3p25.3	Start	8,775,402 bp
Band	3p25.3	End	8,963,773 bp

Gene location (Mouse)
Chr.	Chromosome 6 (mouse)
Band	6|6 E3	Start	112,596,811 bp
Band	6|6 E3	End	112,673,647 bp
RNA expression pattern
Bgee	Human / Mouse (ortholog); Top expressed in: testicle; Achilles tendon; ventricular zone; gonad; ganglionic eminence; jejunal mucosa; stromal cell of endometrium; epithelium of colon; islet of Langerhans; bone marrow cell / Top expressed in: tail of embryo; zygote; spermatocyte; genital tubercle; spermatid; secondary oocyte; primary oocyte; epiblast; lumbar spinal ganglion; inner renal medulla; More reference expression data
BioGPS	n/a
Gene ontology
Molecular function	metal ion binding; polyubiquitin modification-dependent protein binding; Y-form DNA binding; ubiquitin protein ligase activity; damaged DNA binding; DNA binding; ubiquitin protein ligase binding; single-stranded DNA helicase activity; protein binding; identical protein binding; transferase activity; protein-containing complex binding; single-stranded DNA binding
Cellular component	cytoplasm; site of double-strand break; microtubule organizing center; nucleus; replication fork; centrosome; Rad6-Rad18 complex; nuclear inclusion body; cytoskeleton; nucleoplasm; nuclear body
Biological process	protein monoubiquitination; response to UV; negative regulation of cell death; positive regulation of chromosome segregation; cellular response to DNA damage stimulus; postreplication repair; protein autoubiquitination; DNA repair; protein ubiquitination
Sources:Amigo / QuickGO
Orthologs
Databases	NCBI: entry; OMA: entry
Species	Human	Mouse
Entrez	56852	58186
Ensembl	ENSG00000070950	ENSMUSG00000030254
UniProt	Q9NS91	Q9QXK2
RefSeq (mRNA)	NM_020165	NM_001167730; NM_021385; NM_001381931; NM_001381932; NM_001381933
RefSeq (protein)	NP_064550	NP_001161202; NP_067360; NP_001368860; NP_001368861; NP_001368862
Location (UCSC)	Chr 3: 8.78 – 8.96 Mb	Chr 6: 112.6 – 112.67 Mb
PubMed search
- Wikidata
View/Edit Human	View/Edit Mouse

E3 ubiquitin-protein ligase RAD18 is an enzyme that in humans is encoded by the RAD18 gene. A knockout in a human colorectal cancer cell line, HCT116, has also been created.

== Function ==
The protein encoded by this gene is highly similar to S. cerevisiae DNA damage repair protein Rad18. Yeast Rad18 functions through interaction with Rad6, which is a ubiquitin-conjugating enzyme required for post-replication repair of damaged DNA. Similar to its yeast counterpart, this protein is able to interact with the human homolog of yeast Rad6 protein through a conserved ring finger motif. Mutation of this motif results in defective replication of UV-damaged DNA and hypersensitivity to multiple mutagens.

RAD18 is an E3 ubiquitin ligase that enables movement of ubiquitin from a ubiquitin carrier to another protein (the substrate). One activity of RAD18 is to prevent replication fork collapse by promoting DNA translesion synthesis and template switching. RAD18 is also involved in directing repair of DNA double-strand breaks by homologous recombination in post replicative chromatin. RAD18 appears to promote homologous recombinational repair by recruiting the SMC5,SMC6 (SMC5/6) complex to the DNA breaks.

== Interactions ==
RAD18 has been shown to interact with HLTF, UBE2B and UBE2A.
