= UBE2A =

Protein-coding gene in the species Homo sapiens

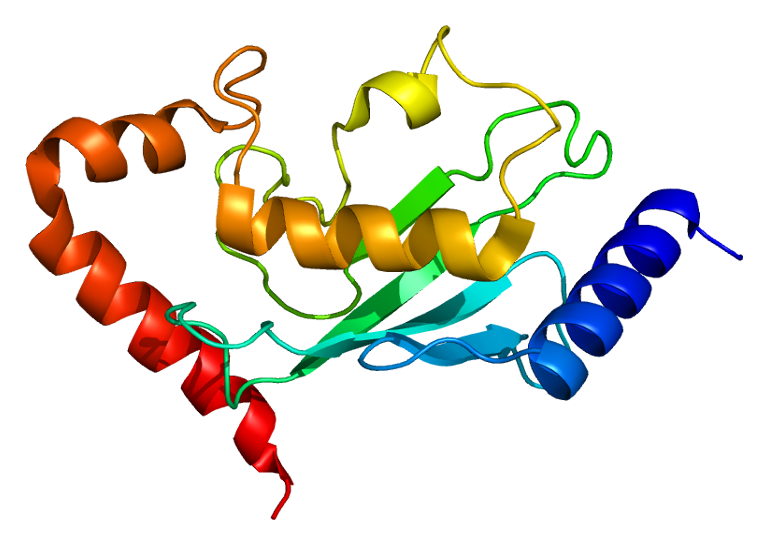

Identifiers
- Aliases: UBE2A, HHR6A, MRXS30, MRXSN, RAD6A, UBC2, ubiquitin conjugating enzyme E2 A
- External IDs: OMIM: 312180; MGI: 102959; GeneCards: UBE2A
Enzyme activity
EC #	BRENDA	ExPASy	KEGG	MetaCyc
2.3.2.23	↗	↗	↗	↗

Gene location (Human)
Chr.	X chromosome (human)
Band	Xq24	Start	119,474,802 bp
Band	Xq24	End	119,591,083 bp

Gene location (Mouse)
Chr.	X chromosome (mouse)
Band	X|X A3.3	Start	36,137,553 bp
Band	X|X A3.3	End	36,147,875 bp
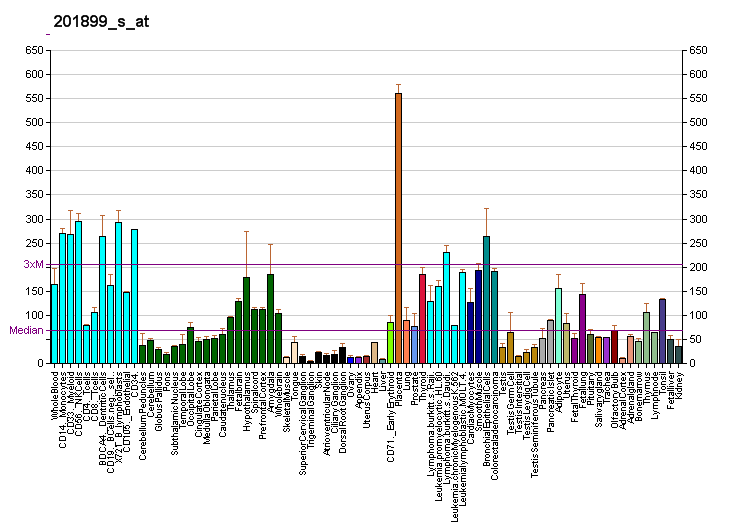

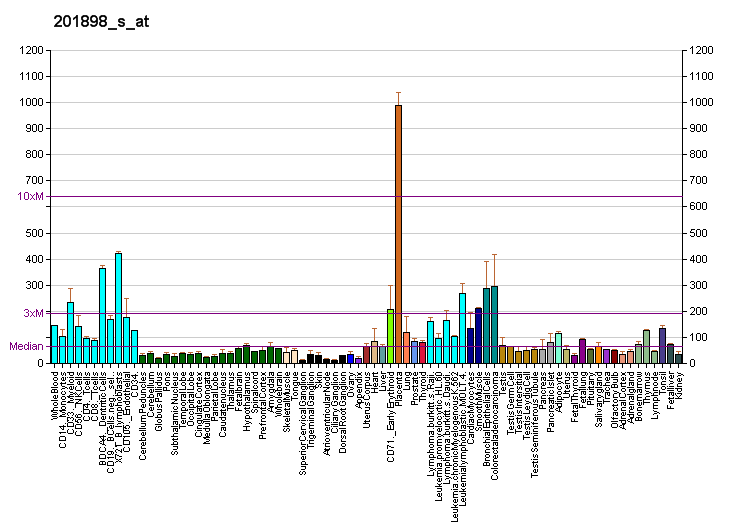
RNA expression pattern
Bgee	Human / Mouse (ortholog); Top expressed in: endothelial cell; mucosa of transverse colon; placenta; rectum; epithelium of nasopharynx; gastrocnemius muscle; right ventricle; optic nerve; left ventricle; monocyte / Top expressed in: endocardial cushion; atrium; atrioventricular valve; medial ganglionic eminence; parotid gland; dermis; right kidney; triceps brachii muscle; epithelium of stomach; blastocyst; More reference expression data
BioGPS	More reference expression data
Gene ontology
Molecular function	transferase activity; nucleotide binding; ubiquitin protein ligase activity; ubiquitin-protein transferase activity; protein binding; ATP binding; ubiquitin binding; ubiquitin protein ligase binding; ubiquitin conjugating enzyme activity
Cellular component	cytoplasm; cytosol; HULC complex; nucleoplasm; chromatin; XY body
Biological process	histone H2A ubiquitination; postreplication repair; ubiquitin-dependent protein catabolic process; protein polyubiquitination; cellular response to DNA damage stimulus; protein K11-linked ubiquitination; protein K48-linked ubiquitination; positive regulation of cell population proliferation; response to UV; DNA repair; proteasome-mediated ubiquitin-dependent protein catabolic process; protein autoubiquitination; protein ubiquitination; in utero embryonic development; maternal process involved in female pregnancy; chromatin organization; blastocyst hatching
Sources:Amigo / QuickGO
Orthologs
Databases	NCBI: entry; OMA: entry
Species	Human	Mouse
Entrez	7319	22209
Ensembl	ENSG00000077721	ENSMUSG00000016308
UniProt	P49459	Q9Z255
RefSeq (mRNA)	NM_181777; NM_001282161; NM_003336; NM_181762	NM_019668; NM_001313696
RefSeq (protein)	NP_001269090; NP_003327; NP_861427	NP_001300625; NP_062642
Location (UCSC)	Chr X: 119.47 – 119.59 Mb	Chr X: 36.14 – 36.15 Mb
PubMed search
- Wikidata
View/Edit Human	View/Edit Mouse

Ubiquitin-conjugating enzyme E2 A is a protein that in humans is encoded by the UBE2A gene.

The modification of proteins with ubiquitin is an important cellular mechanism for targeting abnormal or short-lived proteins for degradation. Ubiquitination involves at least three classes of enzymes: ubiquitin-activating enzymes, or E1S, ubiquitin-conjugating enzymes, or E2S, and ubiquitin-protein ligases, or E3S. This gene encodes a member of the E2 ubiquitin-conjugating enzyme family. This enzyme is required for post-replicative DNA damage repair. Multiple alternatively spliced transcript variants have been found for this gene, and they encode distinct isoforms.

== Interactions ==
UBE2A has been shown to interact with RAD18, UBR4 and P53.

== Clinical ==
Mutations in this gene have been associated with X-linked intellectual disability type Nascimento, also known as Nascimento syndrome. This syndrome is characterized by moderate to severe intellectual disability, dysmorphic facial features, seizures, speech impairment, motor delay, micropenis, and skin abnormalities.
