= Nicola Royle =

British geneticist

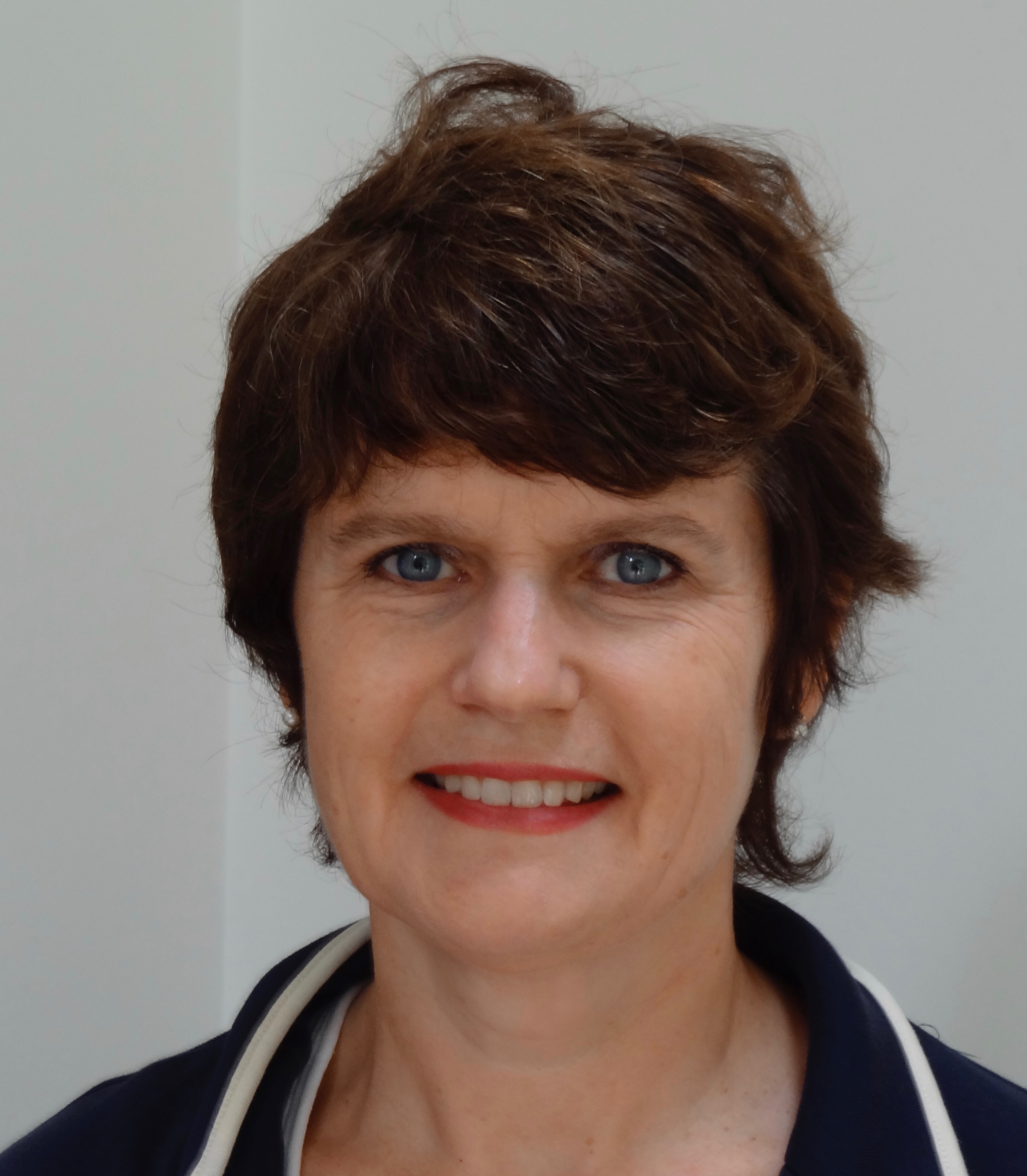

Academic background
- Education: University of Manchester
- Alma mater: University of Reading

Academic work
- Discipline: Genetics
- Institutions: University of Leicester
- Main interests: Telomeres

Nicola Jane Royle is a British geneticist who heads the Telomere Research Group in the Department of Genetics and Genome Biology at the University of Leicester. She is a specialist in the cellular processes that affect the stability of telomeres, the essential DNA-protein structures that cap the ends of chromosomes and play significant roles in cancer and ageing.

== Early life and education ==
Royle earned her B.Sc. degree in Genetics & Cell Biology at the University of Manchester and subsequently her Ph.D.at the University of Reading for her research on the genetics of rare breeds of cattle in Britain.

== Career and research ==
Following her Ph.D., Royle joined J L Hamerton's human genetics laboratory at the University of Manitoba, Canada as a Postdoctoral Research Fellow. She then joined Sir Alec Jeffreys' group at the University of Leicester. During this time she discovered that human GC-rich minisatellites, the markers in genetic fingerprints, are not randomly distributed but clustered towards the ends of human chromosomes. Royle was awarded a six-year MRC-HGMP Senior Research Fellowship to develop an independent research programme in telomere molecular genetics. In 1997 she was appointed Lecturer in Genetics at the University of Leicester and promoted in 2002. She is now an associate professor in the Department of Genetics and Genome Biology.

Royle's research has focused molecular processes that affect the stability of telomeres. She demonstrated that human telomeres evolve along haploid lineages, without frequent recombination in the germline. She contributed to characterising telomerase-mediated chromosome healing in patients with congenital terminal deletion syndromes. Royle and her group showed that defects in DNA mismatch repair (MMR), particularly loss of MSH2, in colon cancers causes telomere instability and subsequently that some telomere-like repeats, notably (CTAGGG)n, are highly unstable during cell division. Her group has made significant contributions to understanding the Alternative Lengthening of Telomeres (ALT) mechanism that is active in some cancers, in particular sarcomas.

More recently Royle's group have studied human herpesvirus 6, which can integrate into telomeres and be inherited in families. They have shown that the inherited integrated HHV-6 genome (iciHHV-6) can be partially or completely excised, and this can adversely affect telomere length. Royle has proposed a model in which excision of the HHV-6 genome occurs through telomere-loop (t-loop) driven processes and may represent the first step towards viral reactivation.
