= UBE2B =

Protein-coding gene in the species Homo sapiens

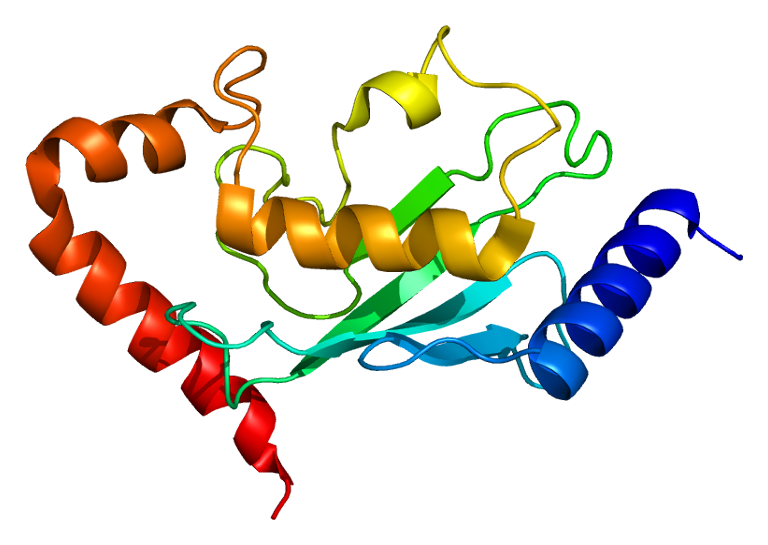

Identifiers
- Aliases: UBE2B, E2-17kDa, HHR6B, HR6B, RAD6B, UBC2, ubiquitin conjugating enzyme E2 B
- External IDs: OMIM: 179095; MGI: 102944; GeneCards: UBE2B
Available structures
PDB	Ortholog search: PDBe RCSB
PDB	List of PDB id codes 1JAS, 2Y4W, 2YB6, 2YBF
Enzyme activity
EC #	BRENDA	ExPASy	KEGG	MetaCyc
2.3.2.23	↗	↗	↗	↗

Gene location (Human)
Chr.	Chromosome 5 (human)
Band	5q31.1	Start	134,371,184 bp
Band	5q31.1	End	134,392,108 bp

Gene location (Mouse)
Chr.	Chromosome 11 (mouse)
Band	11|11 B1.3	Start	51,876,324 bp
Band	11|11 B1.3	End	51,891,589 bp
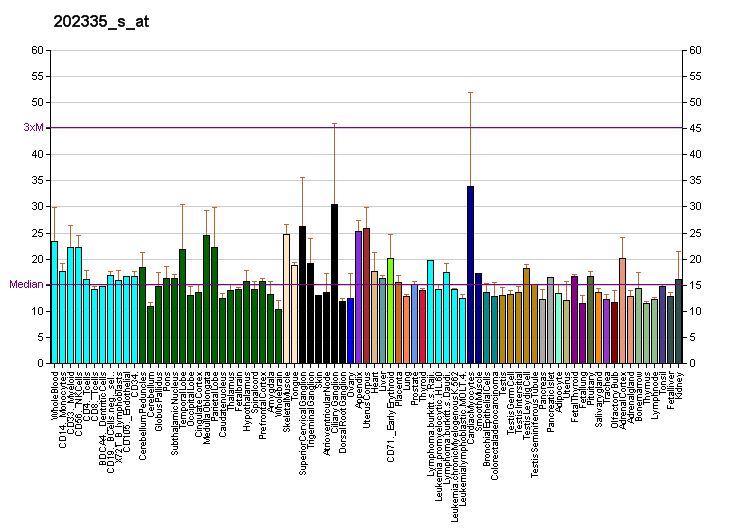

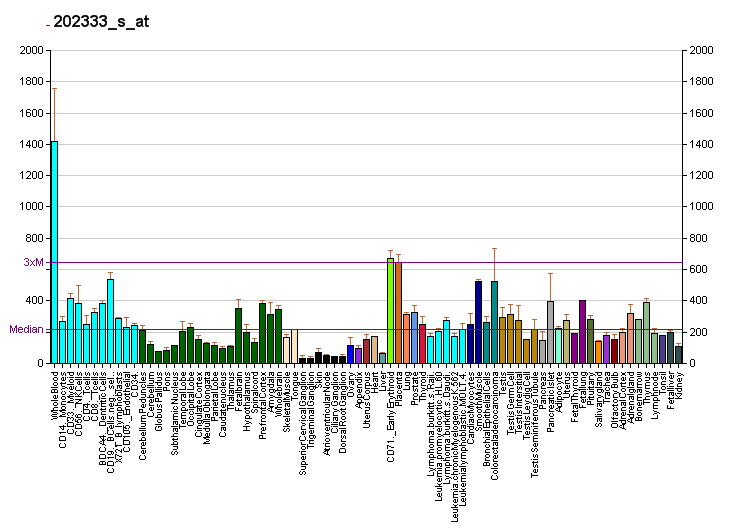

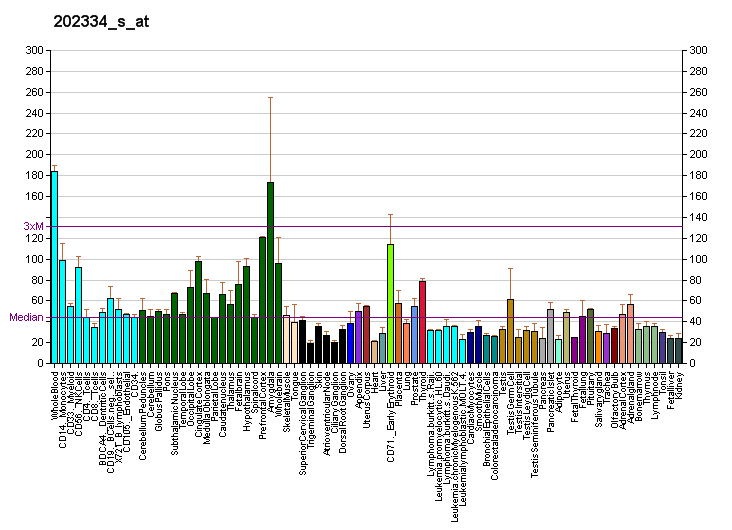
RNA expression pattern
Bgee	Human / Mouse (ortholog); Top expressed in: muscle of thigh; gastrocnemius muscle; Skeletal muscle tissue of rectus abdominis; right lung; right auricle of heart; biceps brachii; body of pancreas; Descending thoracic aorta; anterior pituitary; ganglionic eminence / Top expressed in: intercostal muscle; medial head of gastrocnemius muscle; muscle of thigh; quadriceps femoris muscle; triceps brachii muscle; vastus lateralis muscle; sternocleidomastoid muscle; temporal muscle; atrioventricular valve; arcuate nucleus; More reference expression data
BioGPS	More reference expression data
Gene ontology
Molecular function	transferase activity; nucleotide binding; ubiquitin protein ligase activity; ubiquitin-protein transferase activity; protein binding; ATP binding; ubiquitin conjugating enzyme activity; ubiquitin protein ligase binding
Cellular component	cytoplasm; membrane; plasma membrane; replication fork; HULC complex; nucleoplasm; XY body; chromatin; nucleus
Biological process	chiasma assembly; histone H2A ubiquitination; negative regulation of cAMP-mediated signaling; postreplication repair; ubiquitin-dependent protein catabolic process; protein K63-linked ubiquitination; meiotic telomere clustering; positive regulation of reciprocal meiotic recombination; protein stabilization; protein polyubiquitination; negative regulation of apoptotic process; in utero embryonic development; protein monoubiquitination; sperm axoneme assembly; cellular response to DNA damage stimulus; protein K11-linked ubiquitination; histone lysine demethylation; protein K48-linked ubiquitination; regulation of histone modification; spermatogenesis; canonical Wnt signaling pathway; synaptonemal complex organization; response to UV; proteasome-mediated ubiquitin-dependent protein catabolic process; protein autoubiquitination; DNA repair; protein ubiquitination; positive regulation of canonical Wnt signaling pathway
Sources:Amigo / QuickGO
Orthologs
Databases	NCBI: entry; OMA: entry
Species	Human	Mouse
Entrez	7320	22210
Ensembl	ENSG00000119048	ENSMUSG00000020390
UniProt	P63146	P63147
RefSeq (mRNA)	NM_003337	NM_009458; NM_001362685; NM_001362686
RefSeq (protein)	NP_003328	NP_033484; NP_001349614; NP_001349615
Location (UCSC)	Chr 5: 134.37 – 134.39 Mb	Chr 11: 51.88 – 51.89 Mb
PubMed search
- Wikidata
View/Edit Human	View/Edit Mouse

Ubiquitin-conjugating enzyme E2 B is a protein that in humans is encoded by the UBE2B gene.

The modification of proteins with ubiquitin is an important cellular mechanism for targeting abnormal or short-lived proteins for degradation. Ubiquitination involves at least three classes of enzymes: ubiquitin-activating enzymes, or E1s, ubiquitin-conjugating enzymes, or E2s, and ubiquitin-protein ligases, or E3s. This gene encodes a member of the E2 ubiquitin-conjugating enzyme family. This enzyme is required for post-replicative DNA damage repair. Its protein sequence is 100% identical to the mouse, rat, and rabbit homologs, which indicates that this enzyme is highly conserved in eukaryotic evolution.

== Interactions ==
UBE2B has been shown to interact with RAD18.
