= Triangular face =

One type of human face shape

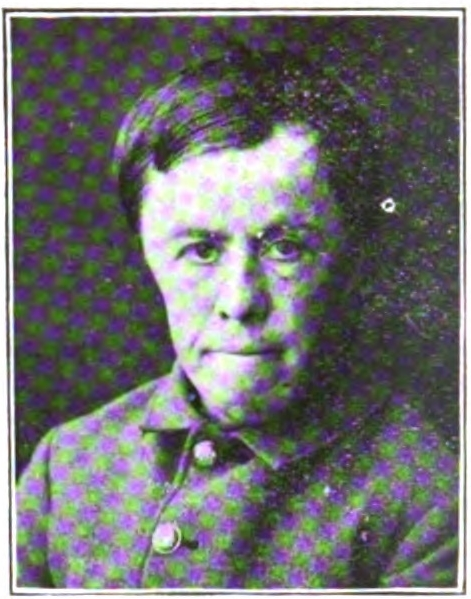
Man with a triangular face

A triangular face, in the simplest sense, is a human face shape with a lower half that becomes relatively thin, approaching an appearance of a triangle with a tip facing downwards. It is not necessarily caused by any disease, but is common in individuals with Osteogenesis Imperfecta.

In a broader sense, triangular face encompasses a constellation of a hypoplastic face with prominent zygomatic arches, orbital hypertelorism, sunken cheeks, down-turned mouth, and occasionally brownish facial discolouration. This constellation is characteristic of Mulibrey nanism, but has also been described in Russell-Silver syndrome and Turner syndrome.
