= FAM180B =

Identifiers
- Aliases: FAM180B, family with sequence similarity 180 member B
- External IDs: GeneCards: FAM180B

Gene location (Human)
Chr.	Chromosome 11 (human)
Band	11p11.2	Start	47,586,678 bp
Band	11p11.2	End	47,589,194 bp
RNA expression pattern
Bgee	Human / Mouse (ortholog); Top expressed in: Achilles tendon; tibial nerve; skin of leg; subcutaneous adipose tissue; right coronary artery; muscle of thigh; skin of abdomen; tibial arteries; left coronary artery; thyroid gland / n/a; More reference expression data
BioGPS	n/a
Orthologs
Databases	NCBI: entry; OMA: entry
Species	Human	Mouse
Entrez	399888	n/a
Ensembl	ENSG00000196666; ENSG00000284938	n/a
UniProt	Q6P0A1	n/a
RefSeq (mRNA)	NM_001164379; NM_001367966; NM_001367967; NM_001367968	n/a
RefSeq (protein)	NP_001157851; NP_001354895; NP_001354896; NP_001354897	n/a
Location (UCSC)	Chr 11: 47.59 – 47.59 Mb	n/a
PubMed search		n/a
- Wikidata
View/Edit Human

Protein FAM180B is a protein that in humans is encoded by the FAM180B gene.

== Gene ==
It is located on the positive DNA strand in Chromosome 11p11.2 (47,586,651 – 47,589,194) and is 1403 nucleotides long. The gene also has 3 exons.

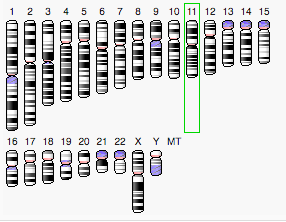
Figure 1. FAM180b is located on Chromosome 11p11.2

== Protein ==
=== Composition ===
The isoelectric point of FAM180b is 4.74 and has a molecular weight of 20KDa. The protein lacks any prominent amino acids, but does have an increase in acidity due to the negatively charged KR-ED.

=== Paralog ===
FAM180A is the only paralog to FAM180b. The four different isoforms of FAM180b are listed below.

Name	Accession number	Length	Amino Acid Length
protein FAM180B isoform 1	NM_001164379 NP_001157851	1403 bp	183 aa
protein FAM180B isoform 2	NM_001367966 NP_001354895	1394 bp	171 aa
protein FAM180B isoform 2	NM_001367967 NP_001354896	1359 bp	133 aa
protein FAM180B isoform 4	NM_001367968 NP_001354897	1465 bp	121 aa

=== Orthologs ===
FAM180b is found in Primates, Mammalians, and Fungi. But there are no orthologs in plants.

A table indicating the various orthologs:

Scientific name	Common name	Divergence from Humans (MYA)	NCBI Protein Accession Number	Sequence length (A.A) ! !Sequence similarity	
Saimiri boliviensis boliviensis	Black- Capped Squirrel Monkey	43	XP_010332662.1	188	91%
Carlito syrichta	Philippine Tarsier	69	XP_008067959.1	181	88%
Otolemur garnettii	Northern Greater Galago	74	XP_012668472.0	183	89%
Microcebus murinus	Gray Mouse Lemur	74	XP_020142069.1	186	88%
Propithecus coquereli	Coquerel's Sifaka	74	XP_012500556.1	182	90%
Peromscus leucopus	White-footed Mouse	89	XP_028734672.1	179	73%
Peromyscus maniculatus bairdii	Deer Mouse	89	XP_006999134.1	179	74%
Cricetulus griseus	Chinese Hamster	89	XP_027247094.1	217	65%
Octodon degus	Common Degu	89	XP_004627338.2	181	76%
Cavia porcellus	Guinea Pig	89	XP_005008583.3	183	79%
Chinchilla lanigera	Long-tailed Chincilla	89	XP_005384010.1	183	81%
Phoca vitulina	Harbor Seal	94	XP_032270037.1	232	58.6%
Podarcis muralis	Common Wall Lizard	318	XP_028581862.1	204	44%
Pogona vitticeps	Central Bearded Dragon	318	XP_020655822.1	207	43%
Python bivattatus	Burmese Python	318	XP_007431575.1	201	42%
Geecko japonicus	Schlegel's Japanese Gecko	318	XP_015271160.1	177	40%
Cyprinus carpio	Common Carp	433	XP_018978565.1	160	36%
Erpetoichthys calabaricus	Reedfish	433	XP_028649020.1	171	40%
Anarrhichthys ocellatus	Wolf Eel	433	XP_031713372.1	163	39%
Trichoderma gamsii	N/A	1017	XP_018664307.1	182	27%

=== Secondary & tertiary structures ===
FAM180b is composed of 63% alpha-helixes and 54.1% beta sheets. Certain amino acids have an overlap in both, hence the percentage exceeding 100% when totaled. The predicted tertiary structure obtained from Phyre 2 can be seen in Figure 3. on the right.

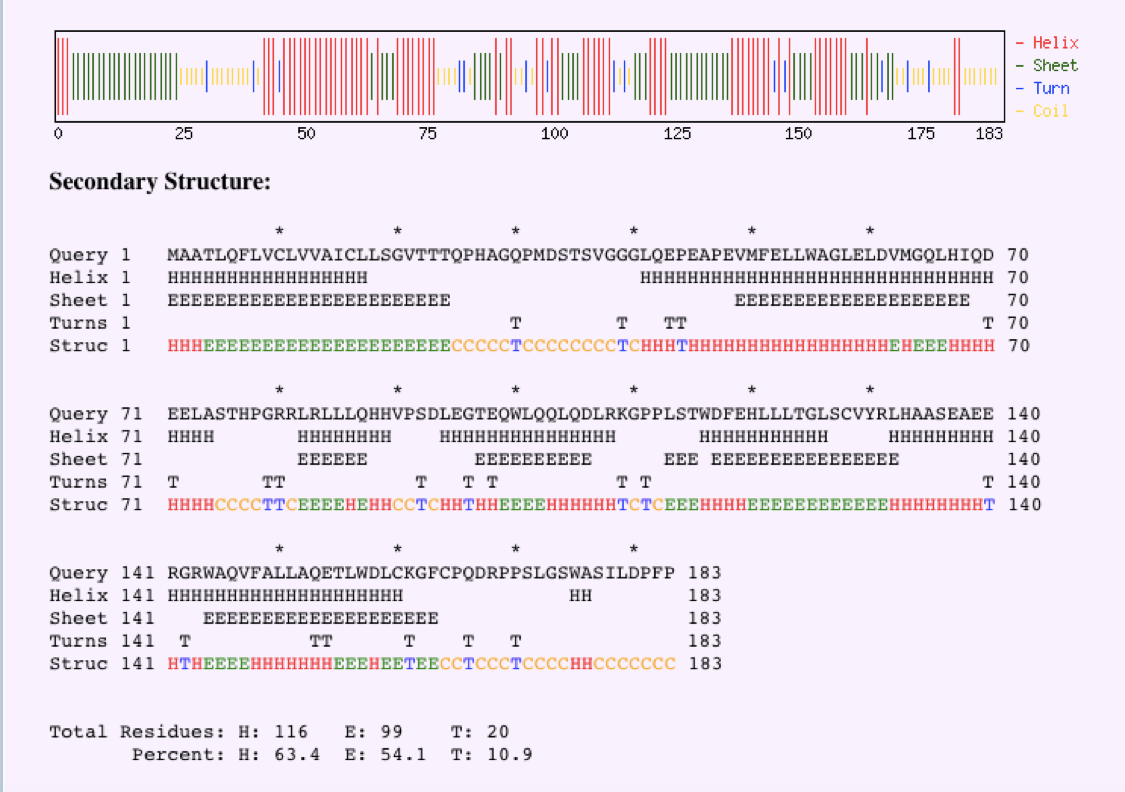
Figure 2. Secondary Structure of FAM180b

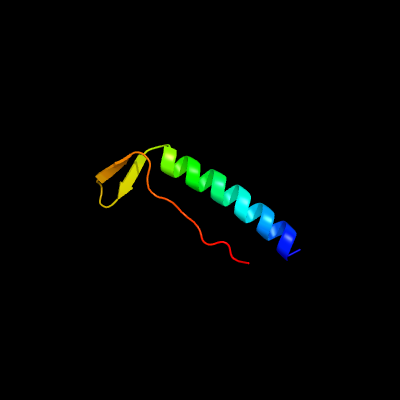
Figure 3. Tertiary Structure of FAM180b

== Regulation ==
=== Epigenetic ===
FAM180b has a CpG island associated with its promoter, and has a CpG count of 150. FAM180b also has relatively low levels of H3K4me1, H3K4me3 and H3K27Ac amongst the cell types, MADD, ARFGAP2, FNBP4, C1QTNF4, AGBL2, and PTPRJ.

=== Subcellular localization ===
The FAM180b protein is predicted to be located in the extracellular region, with a reliability score of 55.6%. The protein contains a signal peptide, which has a cleavage site between 23 and 24 aa. However, FAM180b does not have any ER retention motif in the C-terminus, nor cleavage sites for mitochondria.

=== Post-translational ===
FAM180b has two cysteine residues located at amino acid (aa) 10 and 16, that are predicted to be palmitoylation sites. FAM180b also has three Threonine residues positioned in aa 4, 22, and 23, and one Glycine residue located in aa 19 that are all predicted to be phosphorylation sites. O-GlcNacylation sites are present in serine residues located in 35 aa, 171 aa and in Threonine residue located in 36 aa.

=== Domains & motifs ===
FAM180b has one domain listed as Big-1 (bacterial IG-like domain 1) domain at position 1–8. It has an e-value of 1.6 + 0.3. As for the motif, there is an amidation site at position 78–81.

== Gene Expression ==
In human fetal tissues, FAM180b is expressed in the lungs and stomach at 10 weeks. It's also highly expressed in the intestine at 11 weeks. Amongst various different RNA sequenced tissues, FAM180b is highly expressed in fat, skin, and thyroid.

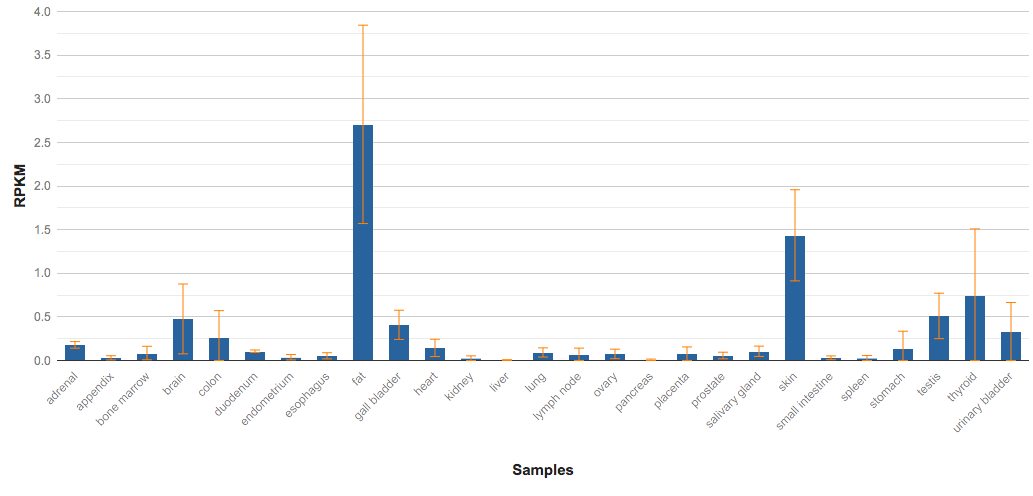
Figure 4. RPKM tissue expression

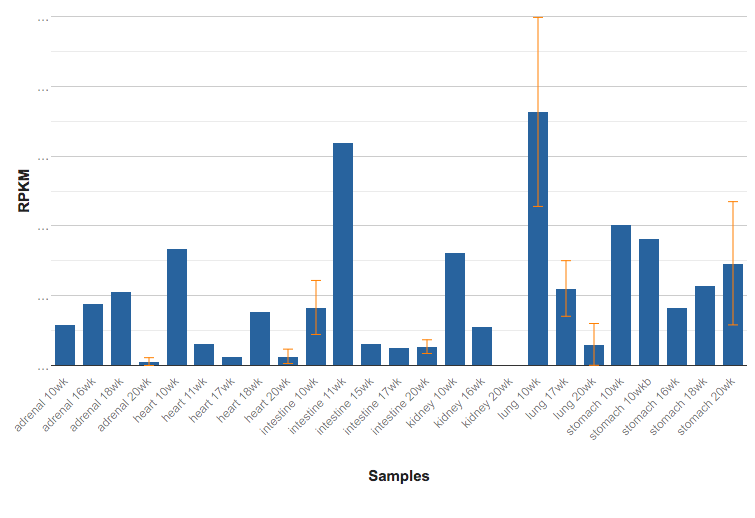
Figure 5. Gene expression in fetal human tissues

== Clinical significance ==
Currently there are no clinical significances associated with protein FAM180b

== Suggested readings ==
Strausberg, Robert L et al. “Generation and initial analysis of more than 15,000 full-length human and mouse cDNA sequences.” Proceedings of the National Academy of Sciences of the United States of America vol. 99,26 (2002): 16899–903. doi:10.1073/pnas.242603899
