= SMC6 =

Protein-coding gene in the species Homo sapiens

Identifiers
- Aliases: SMC6, SMC-6, SMC6L1, hstructural maintenance of chromosomes 6
- External IDs: OMIM: 609387; MGI: 1914491; GeneCards: SMC6

Gene location (Human)
| Chr. | Chromosome 2 (human) |
| Band | 2p24.2 | Start | 17,663,812 bp |
| Band | 2p24.2 | End | 17,800,242 bp |

Gene location (Mouse)
| Chr. | Chromosome 12 (mouse) |
| Band | 12|12 A1.1 | Start | 11,315,887 bp |
| Band | 12|12 A1.1 | End | 11,369,786 bp |
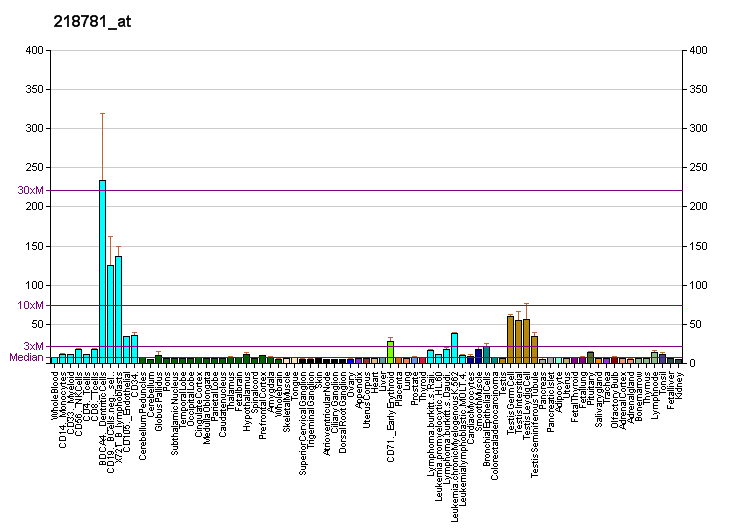
RNA expression pattern
| Bgee | Human / Mouse (ortholog); Top expressed in: sperm; secondary oocyte; Achilles tendon; retinal pigment epithelium; left testis; right testis; testicle; corpus epididymis; Epithelium of choroid plexus; ventricular zone / Top expressed in: tail of embryo; genital tubercle; primitive streak; Rostral migratory stream; spermatocyte; yolk sac; ventricular zone; migratory enteric neural crest cell; blood; spermatid; More reference expression data |
| BioGPS | More reference expression data |
Gene ontology
| Molecular function | nucleotide binding; protein binding; ATP binding; ubiquitin protein ligase binding |
| Cellular component | site of double-strand break; PML body; sex chromosome; nuclear speck; Smc5-Smc6 complex; intracellular anatomical structure; nucleoplasm; chromosome; telomere; interchromatin granule; nucleus |
| Biological process | DNA recombination; cellular response to DNA damage stimulus; telomere maintenance via recombination; cellular senescence; positive regulation of chromosome segregation; double-strand break repair via homologous recombination; DNA repair |
Sources:Amigo / QuickGO
Orthologs
| Databases | NCBI: entry; OMA: entry |
| Species | Human | Mouse |
| Entrez | 79677 | 67241 |
| Ensembl | ENSG00000163029 | ENSMUSG00000020608 |
| UniProt | Q96SB8 | Q924W5 |
| RefSeq (mRNA) | NM_001142286; NM_024624 | NM_025695; NM_001324476; NM_001361252 |
| RefSeq (protein) | NP_001135758; NP_078900 | NP_001311405; NP_079971; NP_001348181 |
| Location (UCSC) | Chr 2: 17.66 – 17.8 Mb | Chr 12: 11.32 – 11.37 Mb |
| PubMed search |
- Wikidata
| View/Edit Human | View/Edit Mouse |

Structural maintenance of chromosomes protein 6 is a protein that in humans is encoded by the SMC6 gene.

== Structure ==
The SMC6 was discovered first in fission yeast as RAD18 (SMC6). It forms a heterodimeric complex with Spr18 (SMC5) protein. In yeast, SMC5/6 complex has sub-units which consists of SMC5, SMC6 and six nonstructural maintenance of chromosomes (NSE) proteins. Nse1-Nse3-Nse4 subunits bridge the Smc5 head Smc6 and allow the binding of DNA.

It is potentially involved in the Alternative lengthening of telomeres cancer mechanism.

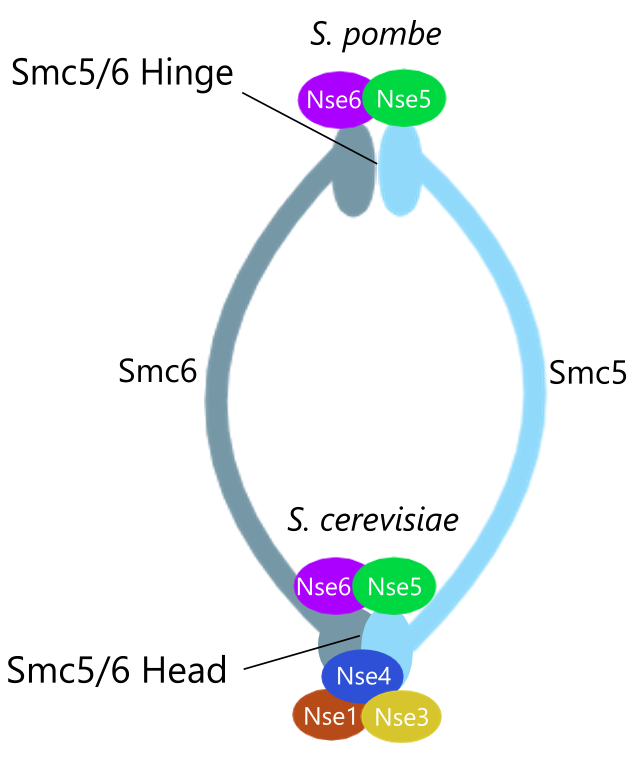
This depicts the placement of Nse proteins along the SMC5/6 complex in budding and fission yeast. This image does not include Nse2, as its position in the complex is not currently known.

== Nse subunits ==
Nse1-Nse3-Nse4 subunits bridge the heads of the Smc5 and Smc6 proteins and allow the complex to bind DNA. Nse5 and Nse6 form a sub-complex which localizes to the head of the SMC5/6 complex in the budding yeast Saccharomyces cerevisiae, and to the hinges of the SMC5/6 complex in the fission yeast Schizosaccharomyces pombe. The Nse5/6 sub-complex is required for the replication of S. cerevisiae, but has not been characterized as essential in S. pombe. Orthologous proteins to Nse5-Nse6 exist in other eukaryotes, namely ASAP1-SNI1 in Arabidopsis thaliana and SLF1-SLF2 in humans, which are believed have similar function to their Nse counterparts. The localization of SLF1 and SLF2 on the human SMC5/6 complex is unknown.

== Localization ==
The Smc5/6 complex has localization methods which are not heavily conserved. In humans the complex is localized to viral DNA sequences using SMC5/6 localization factors 1 and 2 (SLF1 and SLF2) which contributes to viral resistance. In the plant A. thaliana, this heterodimer can be localized to double stranded breaks for homologous recombination using the SWI3B complex of the SWI/SNF pathway. Once localized to the DNA, the SCM5/6 complex non-specifically binds to ~20 DNA base pairs.

== Role in recombination and meiosis ==
Smc6 and Smc5 proteins form a heterodimeric ring-like structure and together with other non-SMC elements form the SMC-5/6 complex. In the worm Caenorhabditis elegans this complex interacts with the HIM-6(BLM) helicase to promote meiotic recombination intermediate processing and chromosome maturation. The SMC-5/6 complex in mouse oocytes is essential for the formation of segregation competent bivalents during meiosis. In the yeast Saccharomyces cerevisiae, SMC6 is necessary for resistance to DNA damage as well as for damage-induced interchromosomal and sister chromatid recombination. In humans, a chromosome breakage syndrome characterized by severe lung disease in early childhood is associated with a mutation in a component of the SMC-5/6 complex. Patient's cells display chromosome rearrangements, micronuclei, sensitivity to DNA damage and defective homologous recombination.
