= UBR4 =

Protein-coding gene in humans

Identifiers
- Aliases: UBR4, RBAF600, ZUBR1, p600, ubiquitin protein ligase E3 component n-recognin 4
- External IDs: OMIM: 609890; MGI: 1916366; GeneCards: UBR4
Enzyme activity
EC #	BRENDA	ExPASy	KEGG	MetaCyc
2.3.2.27	↗	↗	↗	↗

Gene location (Human)
Chr.	Chromosome 1 (human)
Band	1p36.13	Start	19,074,510 bp
Band	1p36.13	End	19,210,266 bp

Gene location (Mouse)
Chr.	Chromosome 4 (mouse)
Band	4|4 D3	Start	139,079,920 bp
Band	4|4 D3	End	139,216,899 bp
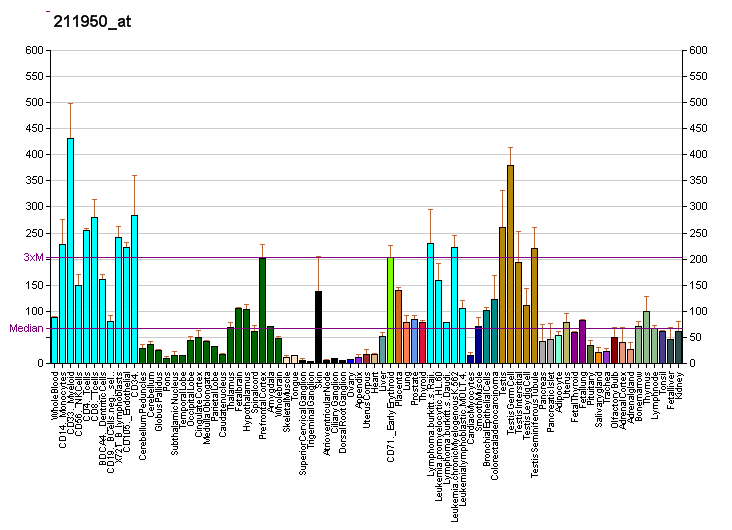

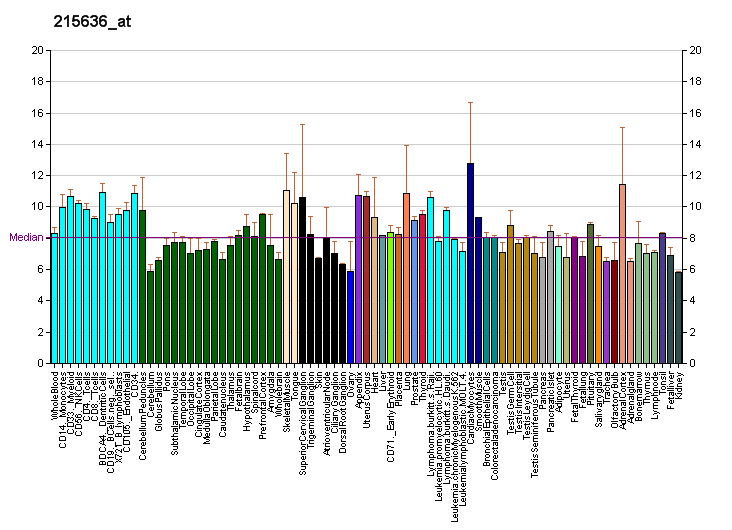
RNA expression pattern
Bgee	Human / Mouse (ortholog); Top expressed in: skin of leg; skin of abdomen; right testis; left testis; gastric mucosa; anterior pituitary; stromal cell of endometrium; apex of heart; right lung; left ovary / Top expressed in: entorhinal cortex; perirhinal cortex; lactiferous gland; CA3 field; muscle of thigh; neural layer of retina; dentate gyrus of hippocampal formation granule cell; superior frontal gyrus; ventricular zone; choroid plexus of fourth ventricle; More reference expression data
BioGPS	More reference expression data
Gene ontology
Molecular function	zinc ion binding; protein binding; metal ion binding; calmodulin binding; ubiquitin-protein transferase activity; transferase activity
Cellular component	integral component of membrane; centrosome; cytoskeleton; membrane; nucleus; nucleoplasm; cytoplasm; cytosol; plasma membrane; specific granule membrane; tertiary granule membrane; ficolin-1-rich granule membrane
Biological process	viral process; protein ubiquitination; neutrophil degranulation; ubiquitin-dependent protein catabolic process
Sources:Amigo / QuickGO
Orthologs
Databases	NCBI: entry; OMA: entry
Species	Human	Mouse
Entrez	23352	69116
Ensembl	ENSG00000127481	ENSMUSG00000066036
UniProt	Q5T4S7	A2AN08
RefSeq (mRNA)	NM_020765	NM_001160319
RefSeq (protein)	NP_065816	NP_001153791
Location (UCSC)	Chr 1: 19.07 – 19.21 Mb	Chr 4: 139.08 – 139.22 Mb
PubMed search
- Wikidata
View/Edit Human	View/Edit Mouse

E3 ubiquitin-protein ligase UBR4 is an enzyme that in humans is encoded by the UBR4 gene.
