= CEP57 =

Protein-coding gene in the species Homo sapiens

Available structures
PDB	Ortholog search: PDBe RCSB
PDB	List of PDB id codes 4L0R

Identifiers
- Aliases: CEP57, MVA2, PIG8, TSP57, centrosomal protein 57
- External IDs: OMIM: 607951; MGI: 1915551; HomoloGene: 8790; GeneCards: CEP57; OMA:CEP57 - orthologs

Gene location (Human)
Chr.	Chromosome 11 (human)
Band	11q21	Start	95,789,965 bp
Band	11q21	End	95,832,693 bp

Gene location (Mouse)
Chr.	Chromosome 9 (mouse)
Band	9|9 A1	Start	13,719,088 bp
Band	9|9 A1	End	13,738,403 bp
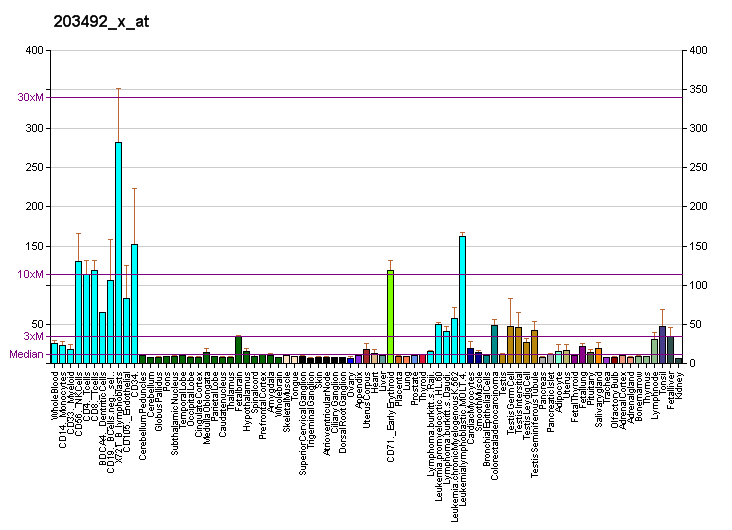

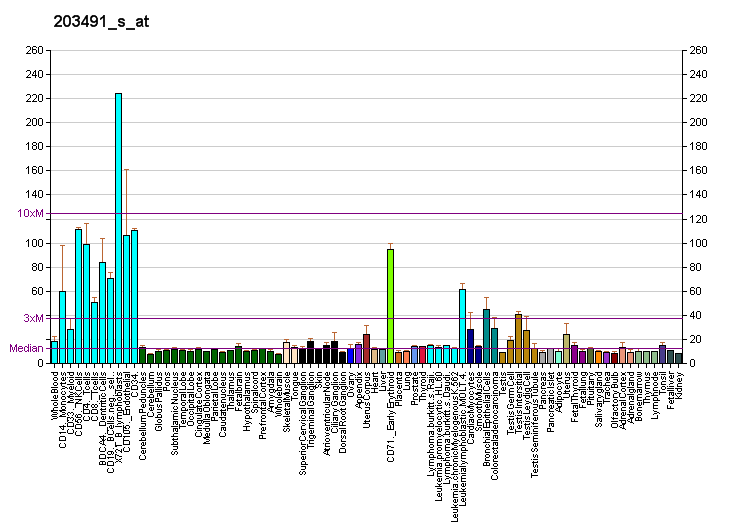

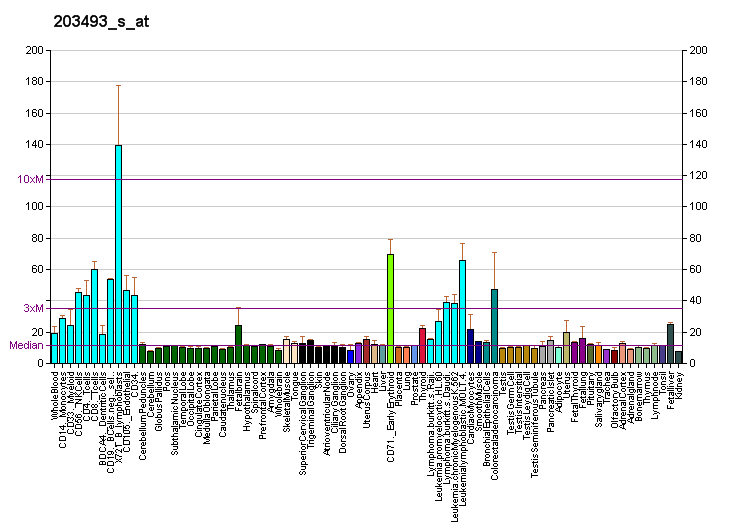
RNA expression pattern
Bgee	Human / Mouse (ortholog); Top expressed in: oocyte; Achilles tendon; sperm; ganglionic eminence; secondary oocyte; gallbladder; hair follicle; ventricular zone; Epithelium of choroid plexus; cartilage tissue / Top expressed in: seminiferous tubule; hand; spermatid; genital tubercle; tail of embryo; spermatocyte; ventricular zone; epiblast; abdominal wall; thymus; More reference expression data
BioGPS	More reference expression data
Gene ontology
Molecular function	protein homodimerization activity; microtubule binding; protein binding; identical protein binding; fibroblast growth factor binding; gamma-tubulin binding
Cellular component	cytosol; centrosome; Golgi apparatus; microtubule organizing center; microtubule; cytoskeleton; nucleus; cytoplasm; microtubule cytoskeleton; nucleoplasm
Biological process	fibroblast growth factor receptor signaling pathway; microtubule anchoring; G2/M transition of mitotic cell cycle; spermatid development; mitotic sister chromatid segregation; protein homooligomerization; ciliary basal body-plasma membrane docking; regulation of G2/M transition of mitotic cell cycle
Sources:Amigo / QuickGO
Orthologs
Species	Human	Mouse
Entrez	9702	74360
Ensembl	ENSG00000166037	ENSMUSG00000031922
UniProt	Q86XR8	Q8CEE0
RefSeq (mRNA)	NM_001243776; NM_001243777; NM_014679; NM_001363604	NM_026665; NM_001310721
RefSeq (protein)	NP_001230705; NP_001230706; NP_055494; NP_001350533	NP_001297650; NP_080941
Location (UCSC)	Chr 11: 95.79 – 95.83 Mb	Chr 9: 13.72 – 13.74 Mb
PubMed search
- Wikidata
View/Edit Human	View/Edit Mouse

Centrosomal protein of 57 kDa is a protein that in humans is encoded by the CEP57 gene. It is also known as translokin.

Translokin binds basic fibroblast growth factor (FGF2; MIM 134920) and mediates its nuclear translocation and mitogenic activity (Bossard et al., 2003).[supplied by OMIM]
