= SMC5 =

Protein-coding gene in the species Homo sapiens

Identifiers
- Aliases: SMC5, SMC5L1, structural maintenance of chromosomes 5
- External IDs: OMIM: 609386; MGI: 2385088; GeneCards: SMC5

Gene location (Human)
Chr.	Chromosome 9 (human)
Band	9q21.12	Start	70,258,978 bp
Band	9q21.12	End	70,354,873 bp

Gene location (Mouse)
Chr.	Chromosome 19 (mouse)
Band	19|19 B	Start	23,183,815 bp
Band	19|19 B	End	23,251,261 bp
RNA expression pattern
Bgee	Human / Mouse (ortholog); Top expressed in: sural nerve; Achilles tendon; left ovary; right ovary; ventricular zone; body of pancreas; epithelium of nasopharynx; rectum; mucosa of paranasal sinus; right lung / Top expressed in: spermatid; seminiferous tubule; tail of embryo; spermatocyte; genital tubercle; neural layer of retina; lateral septal nucleus; maxillary prominence; ventricular zone; abdominal wall; More reference expression data
BioGPS	n/a
Gene ontology
Molecular function	nucleotide binding; protein binding; ATP binding
Cellular component	site of double-strand break; PML body; Smc5-Smc6 complex; chromosome; telomere; cell junction; interchromatin granule; nucleus; nucleoplasm; nuclear speck; sex chromosome
Biological process	DNA recombination; positive regulation of maintenance of mitotic sister chromatid cohesion; cellular response to DNA damage stimulus; cell division; telomere maintenance via recombination; cellular senescence; positive regulation of chromosome segregation; double-strand break repair via homologous recombination; cell cycle; double-strand break repair via nonhomologous end joining; DNA repair; sister chromatid cohesion
Sources:Amigo / QuickGO
Orthologs
Databases	NCBI: entry; OMA: entry
Species	Human	Mouse
Entrez	23137	226026
Ensembl	ENSG00000198887	ENSMUSG00000024943
UniProt	Q8IY18	Q8CG46
RefSeq (mRNA)	NM_015110	NM_001252684; NM_001252685; NM_153808
RefSeq (protein)	NP_055925	NP_001239613; NP_001239614; NP_722503
Location (UCSC)	Chr 9: 70.26 – 70.35 Mb	Chr 19: 23.18 – 23.25 Mb
PubMed search
- Wikidata
View/Edit Human	View/Edit Mouse

Structural maintenance of chromosomes protein 5 is a protein encoded by the SMC5 gene in human.

The structural maintenance of chromosomes' complex underlying mechanisms involved in the dynamics of chromatin dynamics is unknown, and discoveries are shedding light on the various functions. The SMC complex mediates long-distance interactions that enable higher-order chromatin folding in interphase. The SMC complex has an ATPase activity, a conserved kleisin, and regulatory subunits. SMC protein complexes are involved in DNA repair, transcriptional pathways, regulation of chromosome segregation, and immunity in Arabidopsis. In eukaryotes the structural maintenance chromosomes consists of cohesin (SMC1 AND SMC3), condensin (SMC2 and SMC4), and SMC5/6 complexes.

== Structure ==
The Smc5/6 complex was discovered in fission yeast. RAD18 (SMC6), the DNA damage gene in fission yeast, also encodes an SMC-like protein and forms a heterodimeric complex with Spr18 (SMC5) protein. In yeast, SMC5/6 complex has sub-units which consists of SMC5, SMC6 and six nonstructural maintenance of chromosomes (NSE) proteins. Nse1-Nse3-Nse4 subunits bridge the Smc5 head Smc6 and allow the binding of DNA.

It is involved in the Alternative lengthening of telomeres cancer mechanism.

== Nse subunits ==
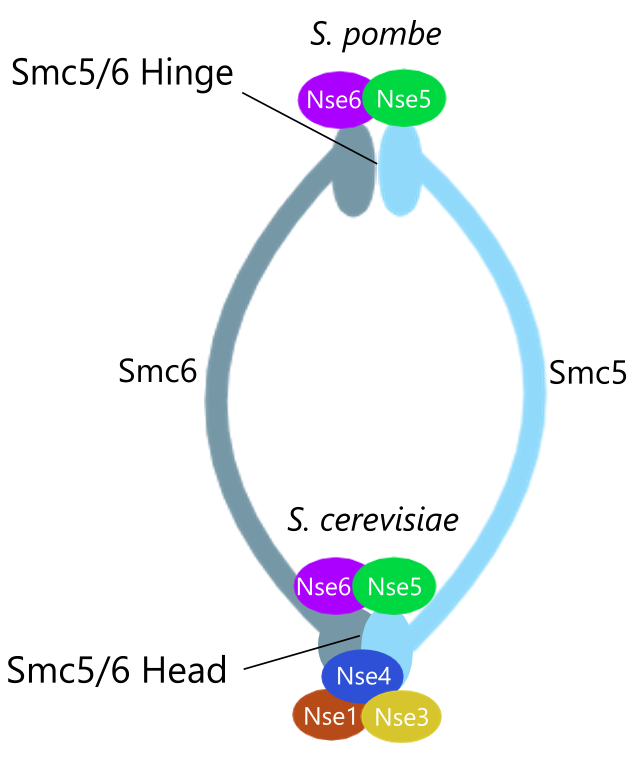
This depicts the placement of Nse proteins along the SMC5/6 complex in budding and fission yeast. This image does not include Nse2, as its position in the complex is not currently known.

Nse1-Nse3-Nse4 subunits bridge the heads of the Smc5 and Smc6 proteins and allow the complex to bind DNA. Nse5 and Nse6 form a sub-complex which localizes to the head of the SMC5/6 complex in the budding yeast Saccharomyces cerevisiae, and to the hinges of the SMC5/6 complex in the fission yeast Schizosaccharomyces pombe. The Nse5/6 sub-complex is required for the replication of S. cerevisiae, but has not been characterized as essential in S. pombe. Orthologous proteins to Nse5-Nse6 exist in other eukaryotes, namely ASAP1-SNI1 in Arabidopsis thaliana and SLF1-SLF2 in humans, which are believed have similar function to their Nse counterparts. The localization of SLF1 and SLF2 on the human SMC5/6 complex is unknown.

== Localization in different organisms ==
The Smc5/6 complex has localization methods which are not heavily conserved. In humans the complex is localized to viral DNA sequences using SMC5/6 localization factors 1 and 2 (SLF1 and SLF2) which contributes to viral resistance. In the plant A. thaliana, this heterodimer can be localized to double stranded breaks for homologous recombination using the SWI3B complex of the SWI/SNF pathway. Once localized to the DNA, the SCM5/6 complex non-specifically binds to ~20 DNA base pairs

== Role in recombination and meiosis ==
Smc5 and Smc6 proteins form a heterodimeric ring-like structure and, together with other non-SMC elements, form the SMC-5/6 complex. In the worm Caenorhabditis elegans this complex interacts with the HIM-6(BLM) helicase to promote meiotic recombination intermediate processing and chromosome maturation. The SMC-5/6 complex in mouse oocytes is essential for the formation of segregation competent bivalents during meiosis. In humans, a chromosome breakage syndrome characterized by severe lung disease in early childhood is associated with a mutation in a component of the SMC-5/6 complex. Patient's cells display chromosome rearrangements, micronuclei, sensitivity to DNA damage and defective homologous recombination.
