= Alternative Lengthening of Telomeres =

Telomerase-independent mechanism

Alternative Lengthening of Telomeres (also known as "ALT") is a telomerase-independent mechanism by which cancer cells avoid the degradation of telomeres.

At each end of the chromosomes of most eukaryotic cells, there is a telomere: a region of repetitive nucleotide sequences which protects the end of the chromosome from deterioration or from fusion with neighboring chromosomes. At each cell division, the telomeres get shorter, eventually preventing further cell division. Healthy adult somatic cells in mammals do not have active telomerase enzymes, so that cancer cells stop proliferating unless they have a mutation which restores the telomeres. Often, this is due to a telomerase enzyme being reactivated, but alternative mechanisms also occur.

== Mechanism ==
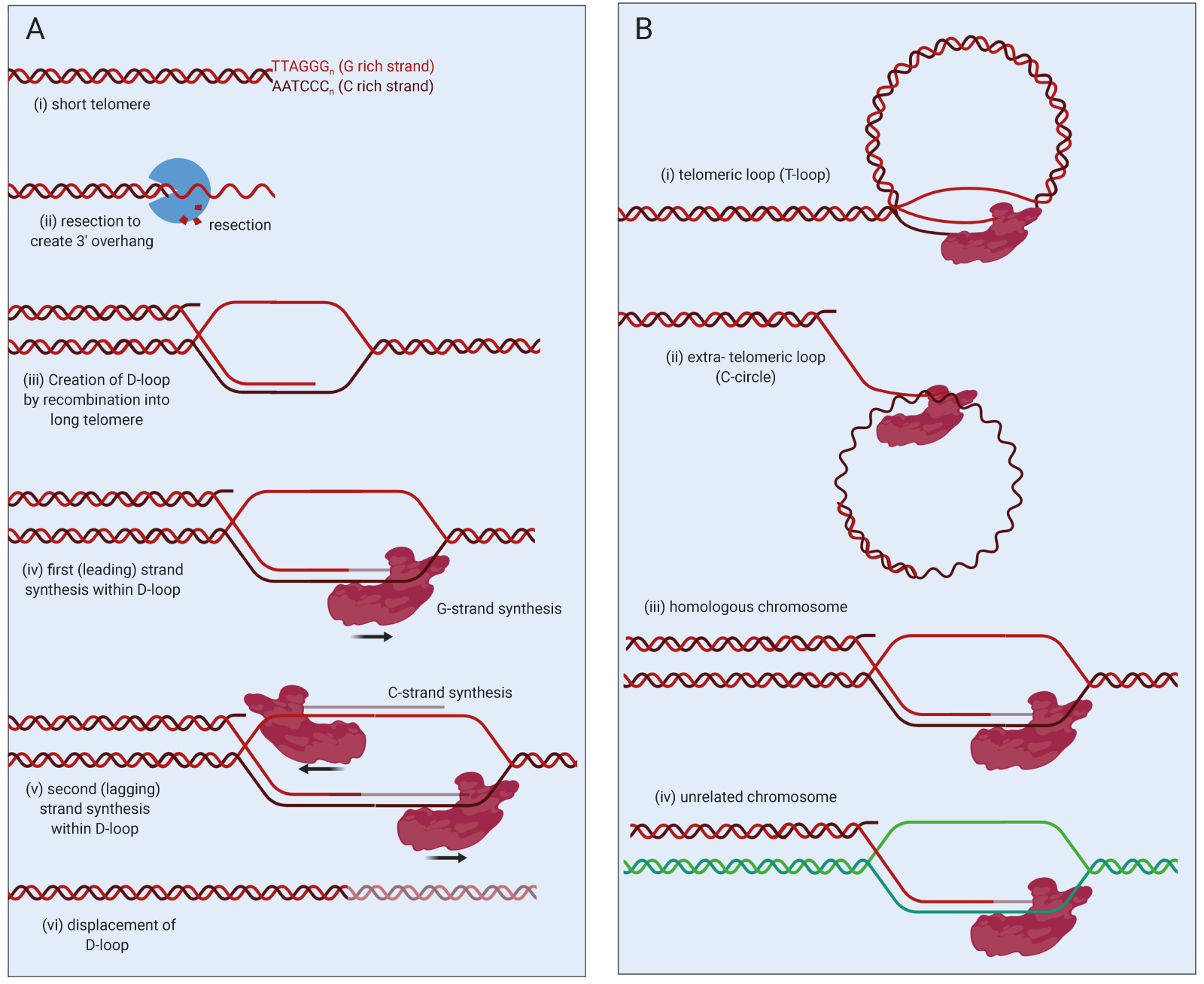
Mechanisms of Alternative Lengthening of Telomeres by a recombination based mechanism. (a) Schematic of conservative replication of DNA by break-induced telomere synthesis. (b) Four potential sources of DNA/telomere sequence that can be copied during new telomere synthesis by ALT

The main alternative lengthening mechanism for telomeres is a type of homologous recombination called Break-induced Telomere Synthesis (or BITS). Normally, homologous recombination allows broken DNA strands to be repaired by lining up with a matching sequence of undamaged DNA, but in BITS, this mechanism is used to extend telomeres. Because telomeres are by nature repetitive, matching sequences are widely available.

In proposed models for how BITS works, the process begins with the resection of a damaged telomere end: one of the strands is cut away to provide a single strand of DNA (the Guanosine-rich strand) that can bind to into a matching (homologous) template, forming a so-called displacement loop (D-loop) (Figure 1a). In ALT, there is evidence that this template consists of: (i) a centromere proximal sequence of the same chromosome (T-loop), (ii) circular extrachromosomal telomeric sequences (C-circles), (iii) homologous chromosomes, or (iv) other chromosomes (Figure 1b). ALT may arise from a combination of some or all of these templates. Importantly, because telomeres are highly repetitive, invasion between or within telomeres is not limited by the requirement for extended homology in homologous recombination. After D-loop formation, DNA polymerase δ extends the invaded G-strand end, copying material beyond the original breakpoint, leading to initiation of lagging strand synthesis of the C-strand, also by DNA polymerase δ.

The second feature of ALT is the production of a non-conservative DNA product at the telomere. At the conclusion of the copying reaction, both strands contain entirely new DNA. This is different from normal 'semi-conservative' DNA replication, where one strand is newly synthesized, and the other comes from the original template. In this manner, ALT allows entire telomeric sequences to be copied from one chromosome to another, without affecting the length or integrity of the copied sequence. Recent work suggests that ALT DNA copying (BITS) proceeds via a D-loop migration model, which is supported by the observation of non-conservative rather than semi-conservative products of break-induced replication at ALT telomeres and the D-loop-shaped products observed in two-dimensional gel electrophoresis at sites undergoing BIR.
