= Transmembrane protein 89 =

Human gene

TMEM89

Identifiers
- Aliases: TMEM89, transmembrane protein 89
- External IDs: MGI: 1916634; GeneCards: TMEM89

Gene location (Human)
Chr.	Chromosome 3 (human)
Band	3p21.31	Start	48,620,759 bp
Band	3p21.31	End	48,621,769 bp

Gene location (Mouse)
Chr.	Chromosome 9 (mouse)
Band	9|9 F2	Start	108,743,687 bp
Band	9|9 F2	End	108,744,631 bp
RNA expression pattern
Bgee	Human / Mouse (ortholog); Top expressed in: testicle; left testis; right testis; mucosa of transverse colon; popliteal artery; tibial arteries; Descending thoracic aorta; body of stomach; bone marrow; ascending aorta / Top expressed in: spermatid; testicle; spermatocyte; duodenum; embryo; jejunum; ileum; colon; zygote; spleen; More reference expression data
BioGPS	n/a
Orthologs
Databases	NCBI: entry; OMA: entry
Species	Human	Mouse
Entrez	440955	69384
Ensembl	ENSG00000183396	ENSMUSG00000025652
UniProt	A2RUT3	Q9DA04
RefSeq (mRNA)	NM_001008269	NM_027066
RefSeq (protein)	NP_001008270	NP_081342
Location (UCSC)	Chr 3: 48.62 – 48.62 Mb	Chr 9: 108.74 – 108.74 Mb
PubMed search
- Wikidata
View/Edit Human	View/Edit Mouse

Transmembrane protein 89 (TMEM89) is a protein that in humans is encoded by the TMEM89 gene.

== Gene ==
=== Structure ===
The TMEM89 gene is found on the minus strand of chromosome 3 (3p21.31) from 48,658,192 to 48,659,288 and is 1,011 nucleotides long. The gene has two exons. These two exons are not predicted to be alternatively spliced.

=== Gene expression ===
The TMEM89 gene is most highly expressed in the testis. TMEM89 is also found to be expressed at low levels in other tissues such as the stomach, kidneys, heart, ovaries, thyroid, colon, bone marrow, and in adrenal tissues. This gene is also expressed in fetal heart, stomach, kidney, and intestine tissues. Immunohistochemistry data has also found TMEM89 located in the cell membranes of the colon, fallopian tube, kidney, and testis tissues. Expression of the TMEM89 gene has also been found in low amounts in the brain tissue from a mouse cerebellum.

==== Gene expression neighborhood ====
Human TMEM89 is a part of the Human Protein Atlas expression cluster 23: SpermatidS - Flagellum & Golgi organization. The 15 closest expression neighbors include OR4M1, ANTXRL, TGIF2LX, CPXCR1, C3orf84, CXorf66, CLDN17, C11orf94, USP50, SPDYE4, MMP20, SSMEM1, SPMAP1, SPACA1, and LYZL1.

==== Differential gene expression ====
TMEM89 expression is much higher in amniotic fluid derived hAKPC-P cells compared with immortalized hIPod line cells. TMEM89 expression is higher in cells that have macrophage migration inhibitory factor (MIF) knocked down compared to the control. TMEM89 expression is the lowest in cardiomyocytes from human embryonic stem cells, compared to expression in human embryonic stem cells, embryoid bodies with beating cardiomyocytes, and cardiomyocytes from fetal hearts.

=== Clinical significance ===
Gene expression of TMEM89 was found to be upregulated in upper tract urothelial carcinomas, and therefore predicted as a possible biomarker secretory protein for these types of carcinomas. The TMEM89 gene was found to be a potential modifier of autism spectrum disorder severity in a SNP analysis. Gene expression of TMEM89 was also used in a model that predicted the risk score for a potential relapse in stage 1 testicular germ cell tumors.

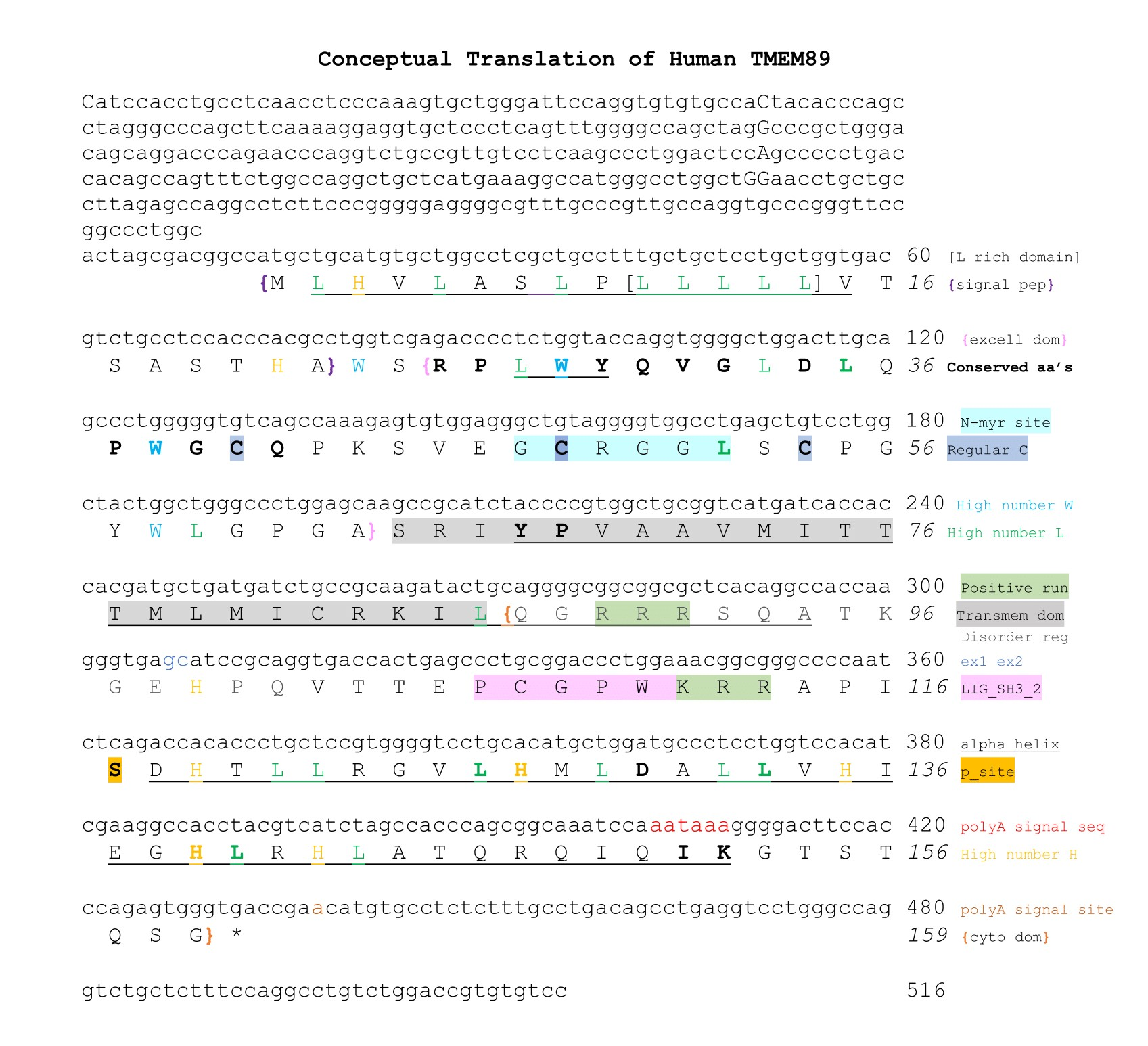
Human TMEM89 Conceptual Translation

== Protein ==
=== Structure ===
==== Primary ====
The human TMEM89 protein is 159 amino acids long. This protein has a molecular mass of ~17.5kDa and an isoelectric point of ~10 pI. Proteins with a more basic pI are usually associated with the mitochondria or the plasma membrane and have fewer protein interactions. The protein structure contains two topological domains (extracellular and cytoplasmic) and a helical transmembrane domain. The human TMEM89 protein is rich in the amino acids histidine, leucine, and tryptophan. The amino acids aspartate, asparagine, and phenylalanine are present in low amounts in the human TMEM89 protein. Amino acid patterns such as ED are present in the human TMEM89 protein at low amounts, while the pattern KR-ED is present in high amounts. Within the extracellular domain of the human TMEM89 protein, there are 3 cysteines with regular spacing. In the cytoplasmic domain, there are two positive amino acid runs from amino acids 3-5 and 25–27. These different amino acid patterns and protein domains can be visualized in the figures to the right.

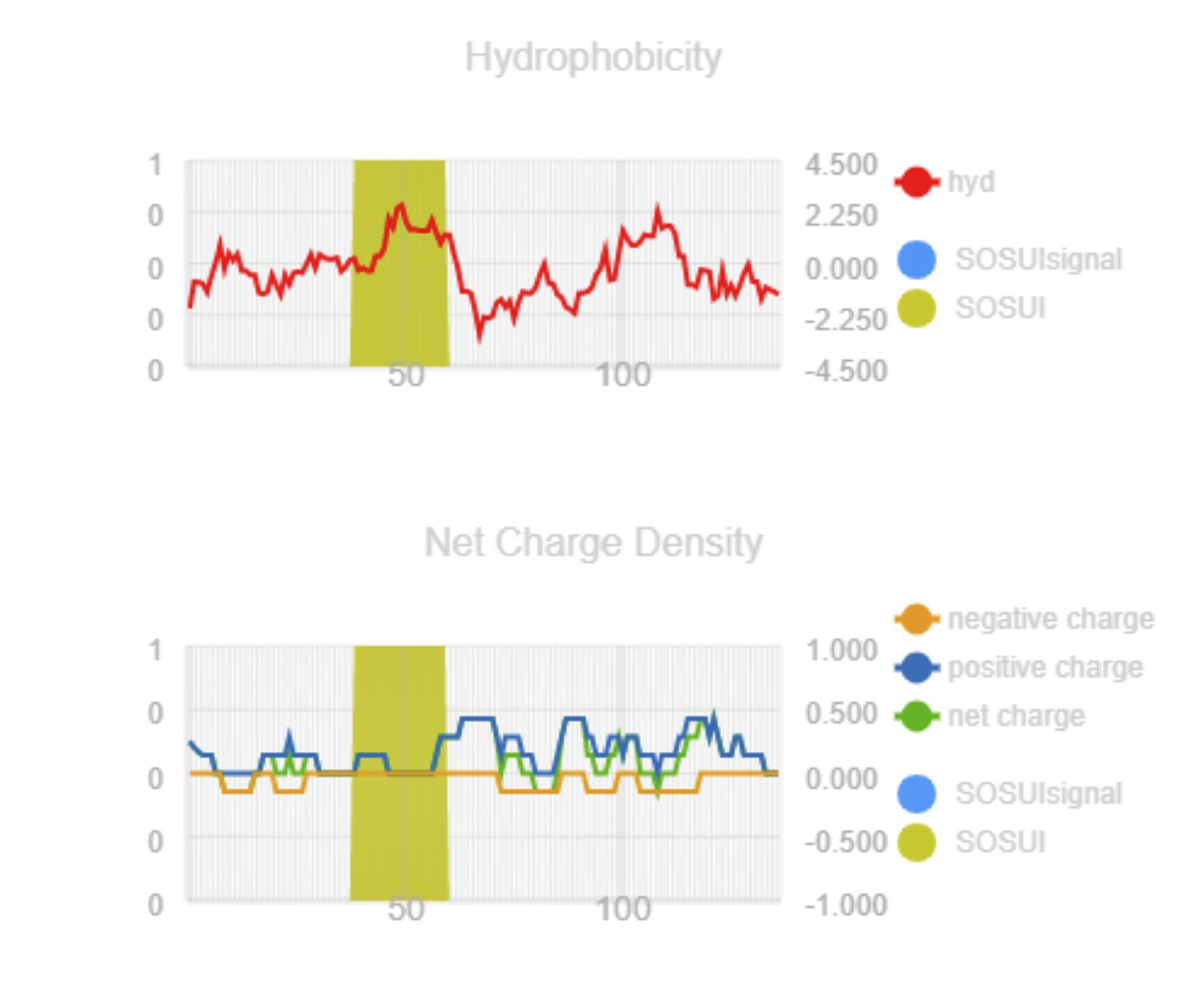
Human TMEM89 SOSUI Hydrophobicity and Net Charge Density Graph

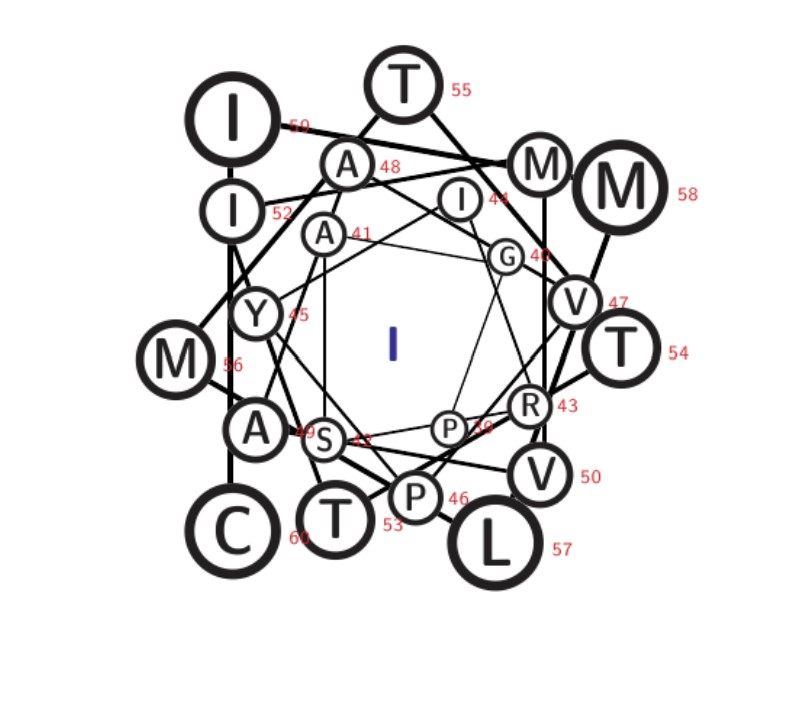
SOSUI Human TMEM89 Wheel Plot

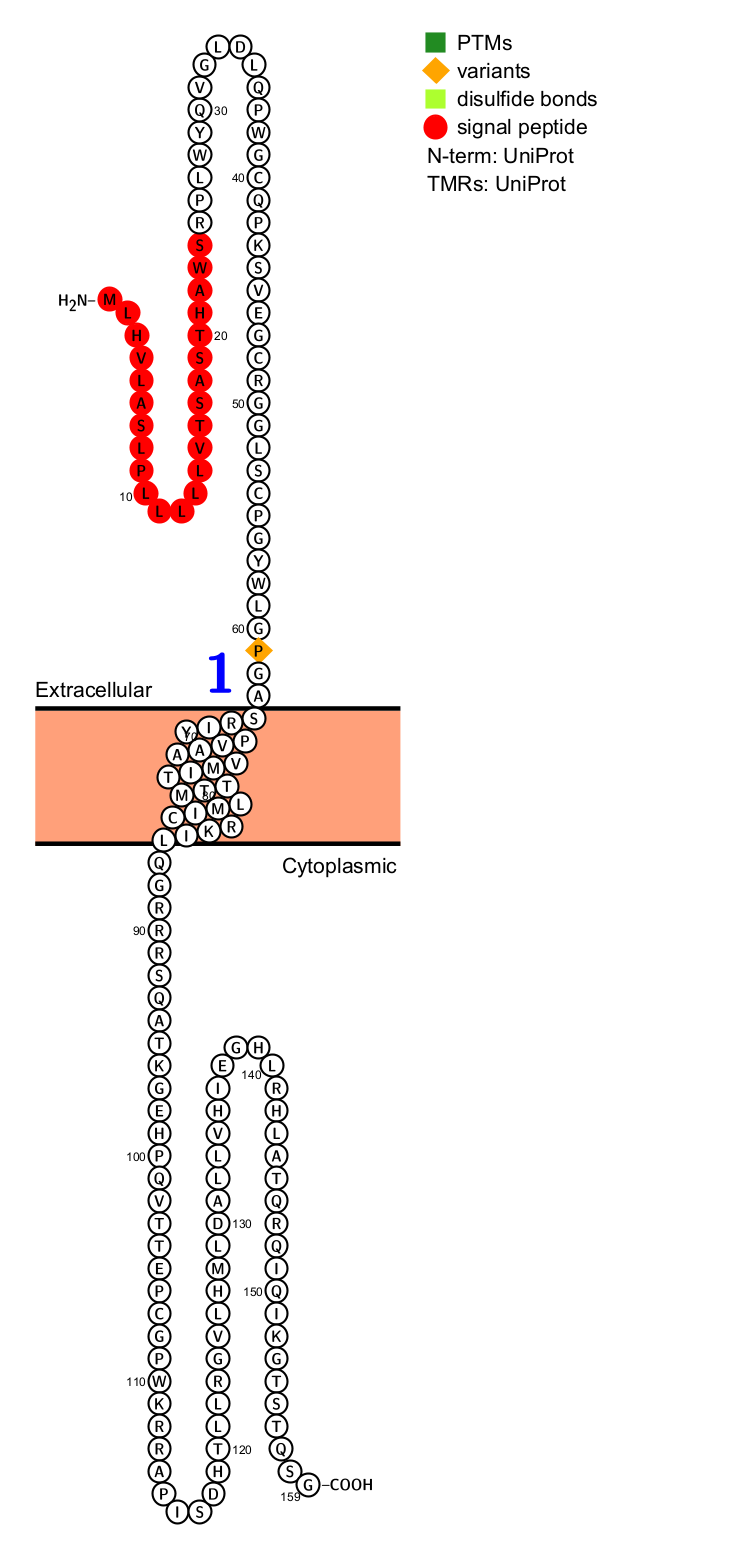
Protter Human TMEM89 Snake Plot

==== Secondary ====
The TMEM89 protein is only made up of α-helices and strands. The α-helices are distributed all throughout the protein in all three domains.

==== Tertiary ====
The tertiary structure of Human TMEM89 was predicted using Alphafold and I-Tasser software. These structures can be seen on the right.

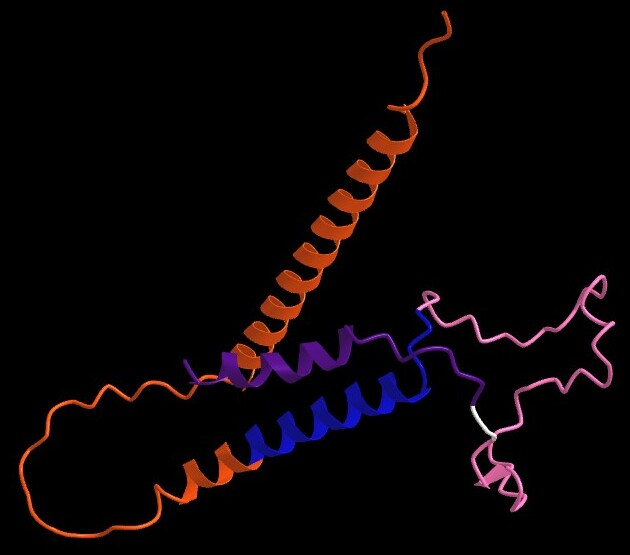
Human TMEM89 Tertiary Structure With Labeled Domains

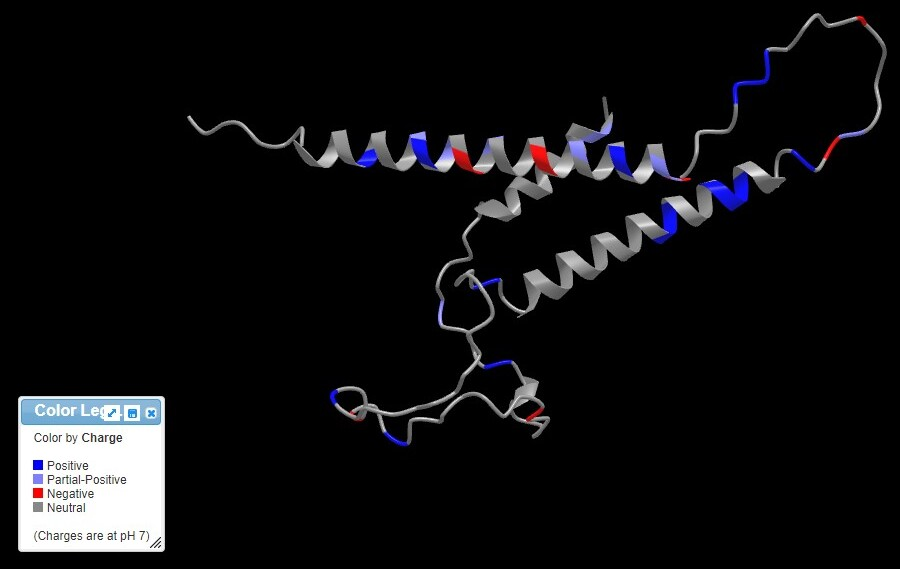
Human TMEM89 Tertiary Structure with Labeled Charges

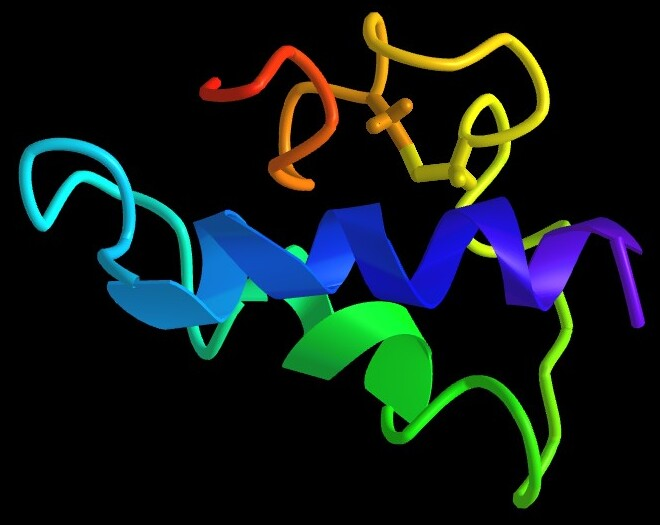
I-Tasser Human TMEM89 Signal Peptide and Extracellular Domain Structure Prediction

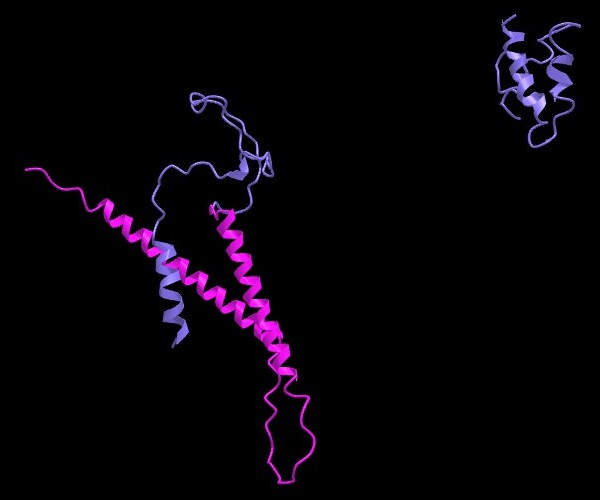
I-Tasser and Alphafold Human TMEM89 Signal Peptide and Extracellular Domain Comparison

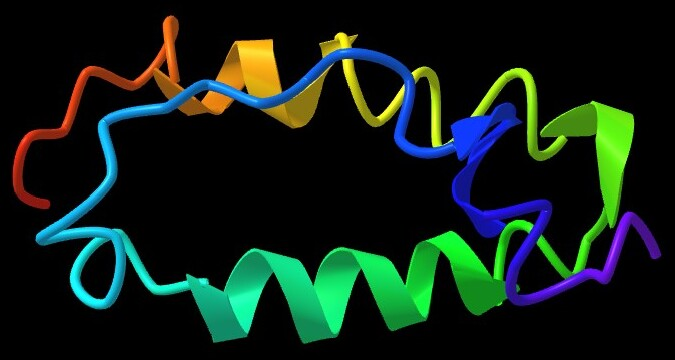
I-Tasser Human TMEM89 Cytoplasmic Domain Structure Prediction

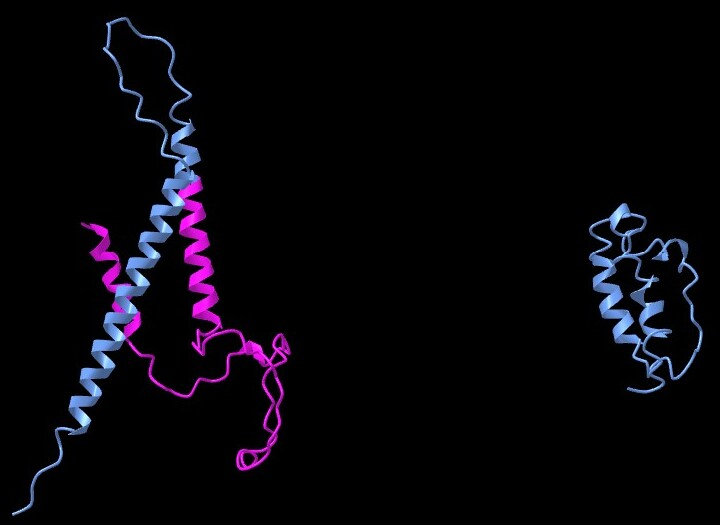
I-Tasser and Alphafold Human TMEM89 Cytoplasmic Domain Comparison

=== Post-translational modifications ===
The TMEM89 protein has a predicted N-myristylation site from amino acids 47–52, a predicted Src homology 3 (SH3) binding domain from amino acids 106–111, and one conserved predicted phosphorylation site at amino acid S117. N-myristylation is a protein lipid modification that has roles in protein-protein interactions, cell signaling, and targeting proteins to endomembranes and the plasma membrane. Proteins with SH3 binding domains are usually involved in signal transduction pathways, cytoskeleton organization, membrane trafficking, or organelle assembly. Protein phosphorylation is an important process involved with signal transduction, protein synthesis, cell division, cell growth, development, and aging.

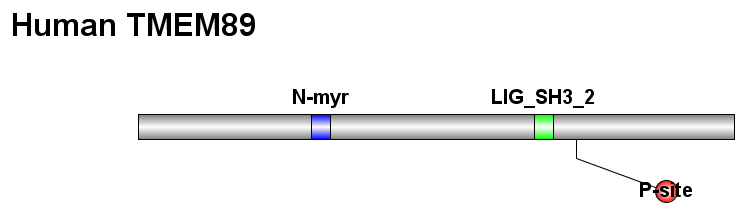
Human TMEM89 Motif Schematic

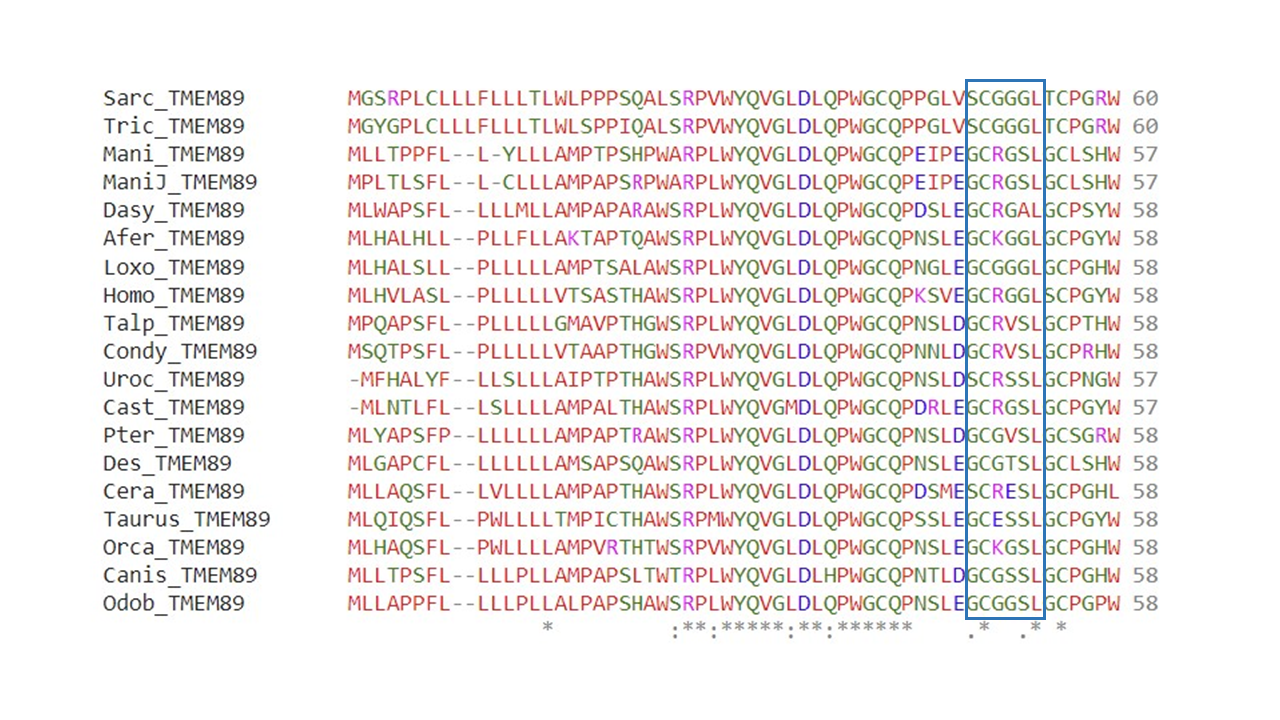
Human TMEM89 N-myristylation Site Multiple Sequence Alignment

=== Interactions ===
The human TMEM89 protein interacts with the proteins C4A, RBM15B, GOLGA6A, PFKFB4, DOCK3, MAPKAPK3, ZNF557, and ZBTB47.

== Homologs ==
=== Orthologs ===
Orthologs of TMEM89 are only found in mammals. The only mammalian taxon that does not contain a TMEM89 ortholog is the monotremes.

Below is a table with information on some of the orthologs of human TMEM89. These orthologs were used to make the multiple sequence alignment and N-myristylation site alignment to the right.

TMEM89 Ortholog Table
Genus and species	Common name	Taxon	Date of Divergence (MYA)	NCBI Accession Number	Sequence length (aa)	% Identity	% Similarity
Homo sapiens	Humans	Primate	0	NP_001008270.1	159	100	100
Castor canadensis	American beaver	Rodentia	87	XP_020018275.1	158	73.1	81.2
Urocitellus parryii	Arctic ground squirrel	Rodentia	87	XP_026239733.1	155	66.0	74.8
Orcinus orca	Orca	Artiodactyla	94	XP_004283952.1	159	71.9	80.0
Bos taurus	Cow	Artiodactyla	94	NP_001104538.1	159	63.5	73.5
Odobenus rosmarus divergens	Pacific walrus	Carnivora	94	XP_004399365.2	159	67.9	77.4
Canis lupus familiaris	Dog	Carnivora	94	XP_038283783.1	159	65.6	76.2
Talpa occidentalis	Spanish mole	Eulipotphyla	94	XP_037376292.1	162	66.7	75.3
Condylura cristata	Star-nosed mole	Eulipotphyla	94	XP_004676653.1	162	63.0	74.1
Pteropus alecto	Black flying fox	Chiroptera	94	XP_006909233.1	156	65.2	74.5
Desmodus rotundus	Common vampire bat	Chiroptera	94	XP_024421609.1	159	63.8	74.4
Ceratotherium simum simum	Southern white rhinoceros	Perissodactyla	94	XP_004419716.1	159	64.2	78.0
Equus caballus	Horse	Perissodactyla	94	XP_003363167.2	207	49.8	58.9
Manis javanica	Malayan pangolin	Pholidota	94	KAI5937412.1	158	53.8	67.5
Manis pentadactyla	Chinese pangolin	Pholidota	94	XP_036733472.1	158	53.1	66.0
Orycteropus afer afer	Aardvark	Tubulidentata	99	XP_007953489.1	160	68.9	77.0
Loxodonta africana	African bush elephant	Proboscidea	99	XP_003409726.1	160	68.8	79.4
Dasypus novemcinctus	Nine-banded armadillo	Cingulata	99	XP_004451990.1	157	67.5	75.0
Sarcophilus harrisii	Tasmanian devil	Dasyuromorphia	160	XP_031794457.1	168	41.0	52.2
Trichosurus vulpecula	Common brushtail possum	Diprotodontia	160	XP_036595517.1	168	40.8	51.4

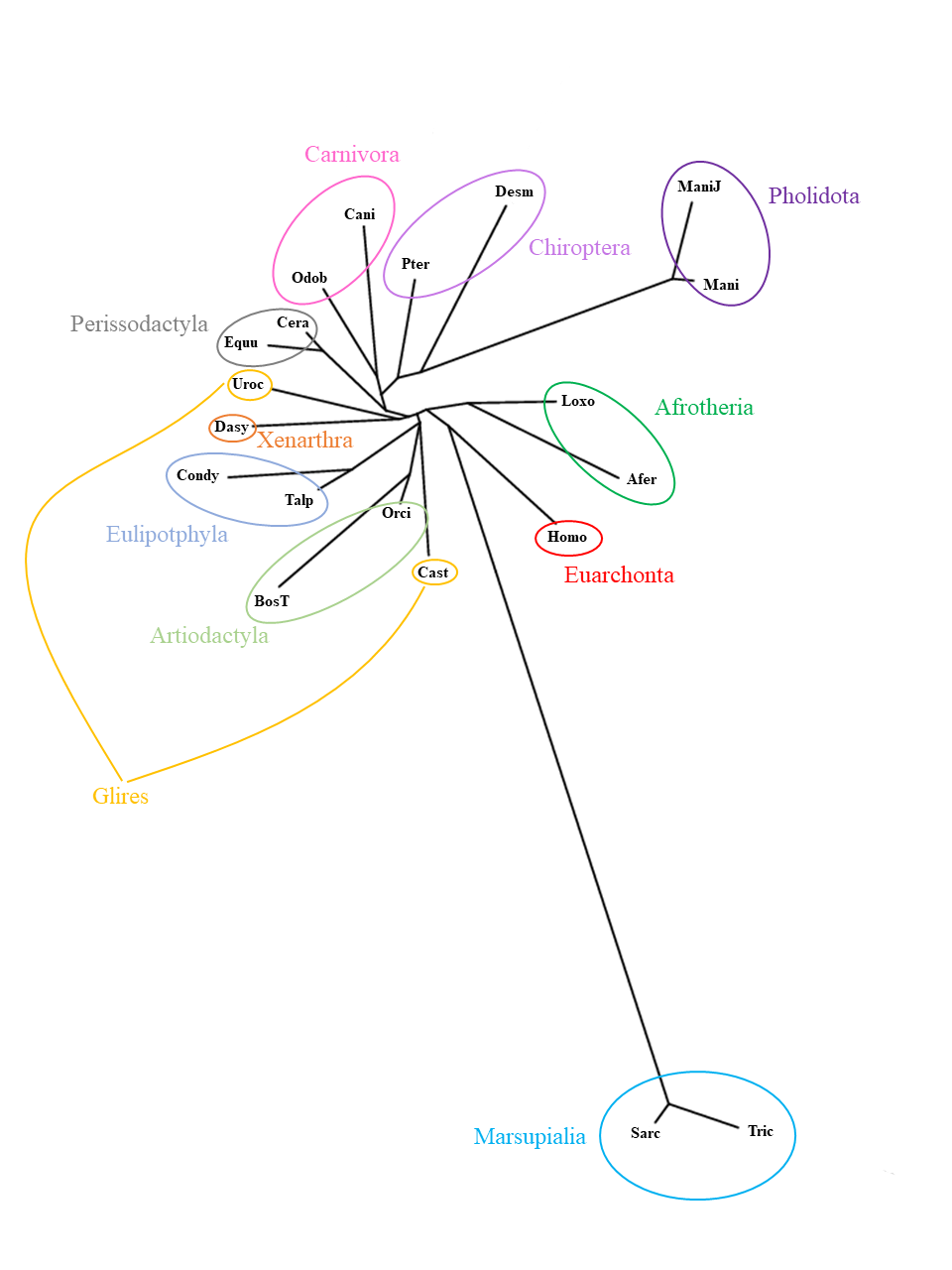
Unrooted Phylogenetic Tree of Human TMEM89 Orthologs

=== Conserved regions ===
Regions within the cytoplasmic and extracellular domains of the human TMEM89 protein seem to be the most conserved, as seen in figures on the right. Some of these conserved amino acids are part of α-helices in the cytoplasmic and extracellular regions.

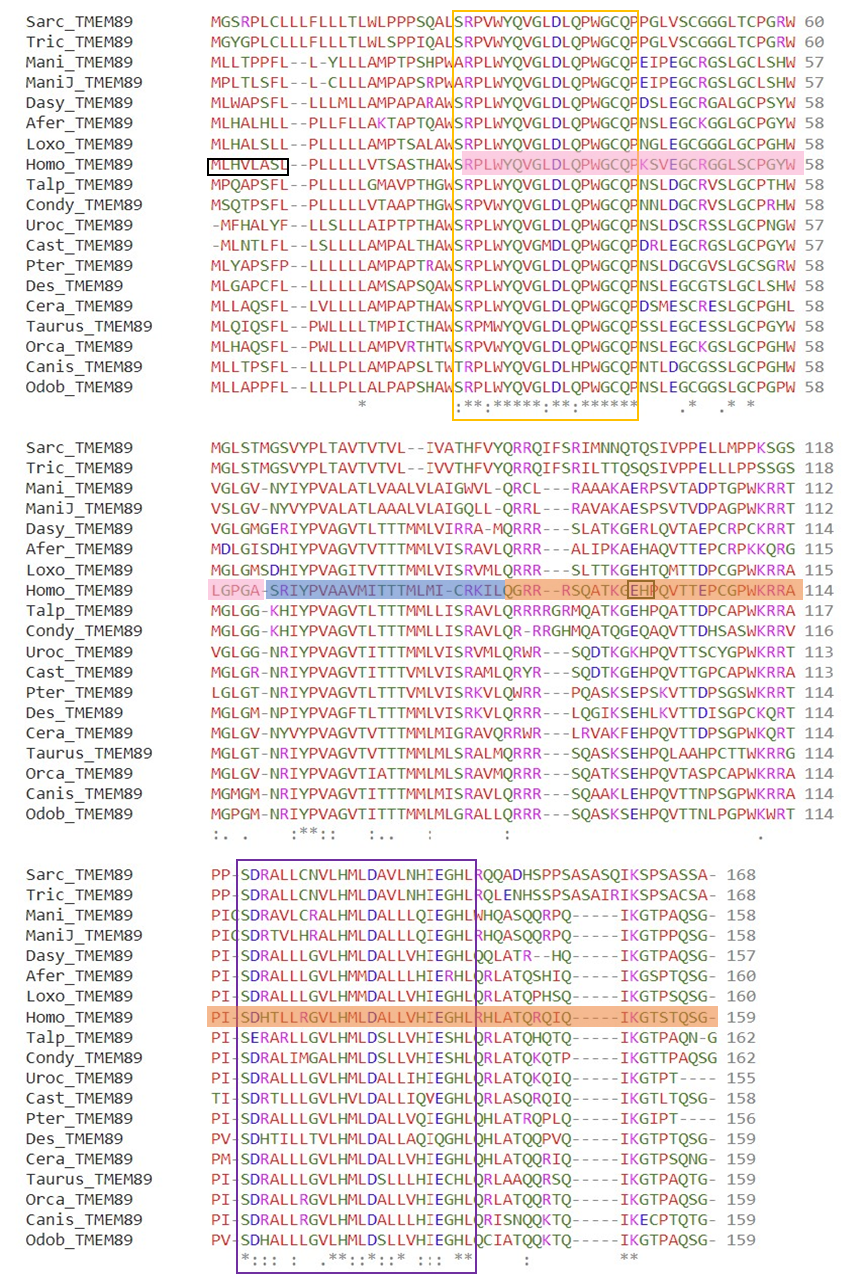
Human TMEM89 Orthologs Multiple Sequence Alignment
