= CXorf66 =

Human protein

Identifiers
- Aliases: CXorf66, SGPX, chromosome X open reading frame 66
- External IDs: MGI: 3779666; GeneCards: CXorf66

Gene location (Human)
Chr.	X chromosome (human)
Band	Xq27.1	Start	139,955,728 bp
Band	Xq27.1	End	139,965,521 bp

Gene location (Mouse)
Chr.	X chromosome (mouse)
Band	X A6|X	Start	59,481,241 bp
Band	X A6|X	End	59,582,855 bp
RNA expression pattern
Bgee	Human / Mouse (ortholog); Top expressed in: testicle; left testis; right testis; liver; right lobe of liver; human musculoskeletal system; skeletal muscle; lower limb muscles; muscle of leg; gastrocnemius muscle / Top expressed in: spermatid; zygote; primary oocyte; testicle; secondary oocyte; spermatocyte; More reference expression data
BioGPS	n/a
Orthologs
Databases	NCBI: entry; OMA: entry
Species	Human	Mouse
Entrez	347487	631784
Ensembl	ENSG00000203933	ENSMUSG00000079583
UniProt	Q5JRM2	n/a
RefSeq (mRNA)	NM_001013403	NM_001039240; NM_001382307
RefSeq (protein)	NP_001013421	n/a
Location (UCSC)	Chr X: 139.96 – 139.97 Mb	Chr X: 59.48 – 59.58 Mb
PubMed search
- Wikidata
View/Edit Human	View/Edit Mouse

CXorf66 also known as Chromosome X Open Reading Frame 66, is a 361aa protein in humans that is encoded by the CXorf66 gene. The protein encoded is predicted to be a type 1 transmembrane protein; however, its exact function is currently unknown.

CXorf66 protein is a potential novel cancer biomarker.

== Gene ==
CXorf66 is located on Chromosome X at Xq27.1 and is on the complement strand. The CXorf66 gene is located between ATP11C ATPase, MIR505, and HNRNPA3P3. In addition to this, according to OMIM, CXorf66 is positioned between SOX3, SPANXB1, and CDR1.

Gene locus for human gene CXorf66 on Chromosome X

== mRNA ==
=== Splice variants ===
CXorf66 only consists of one known splice variant with three exons (1-117, 118-271, and 272-1288bp) and two introns. Locations of junctions occur at 30aa [G] and 81aa [M].

Splicing of CXorf66 gene

CXorf66 has only been found to have only one polyadenylation site.

== Protein ==
=== Composition ===
With 57 serines and 42 lysines, the CXorf66 protein is both serine and lysine rich. CXorf66 has a molecular weight of 39.9kdal and an isoelectric point of 9.89.

=== Domains ===
CXorf66 protein has a predicted signal peptide from 1-19aa, a topological domain from 20-47aa, a transmembrane domain from 48-68aa, and a second topological domain from 69-361aa. A signal peptide cleavage site is predicted to occur between the 17-18aa. Upon analyzing the protein's composition (serine and lysine rich) and post-translational modifications (high levels of phosphorylation), it is predicted that the first topological domain [20-47aa] is extracellular, while the topological domain [69-361aa] is cytoplasmic. A visual can be seen in Figure II.

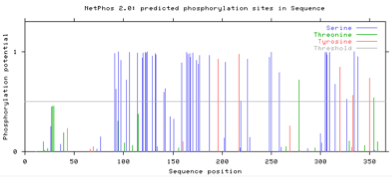
Figure I. Candidate phosphorylation sites in human CXorf66 protein

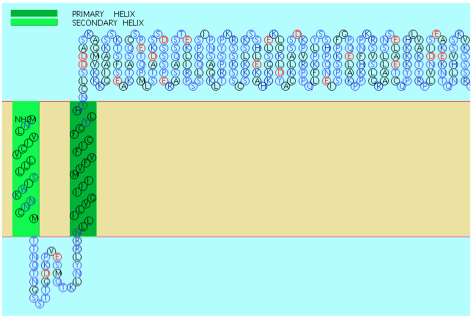
Figure II. SOSUI Prediction of CXorf66 protein transmembrane topology

Three repeat motifs of DKPV [31-34 and 204-207aa], SEAK [97-100 and 287-290aa], and PKRS [161-164 and 245-248aa] have been found in the human CXorf66 protein. These repeats are conserved in other primates like Gorilla gorilla gorilla and Macaca mulatta, but are not present in other mammals.

=== SNPs ===
There is one natural variant of the population (frequency 0.436) at 233aa from proline to leucine in the CXorf66 protein, with proline being the ancestral encoded amino acid. No effects have been observed with this missense mutation.

=== Interacting proteins ===
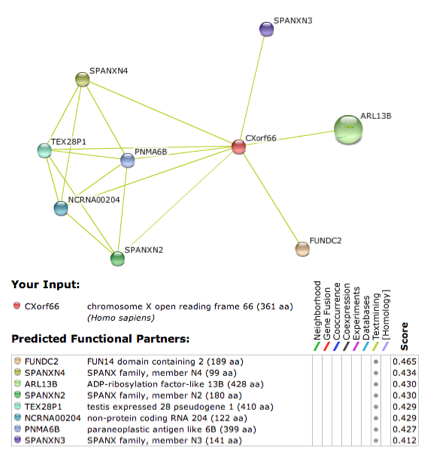
Figure III. STRING Predicted Protein Interactions for Human CXorf66

Based on STRING's predicted protein interaction, CXorf66 has medium level scoring for being tied to the proteins listed in Figure III. All proteins listed are not experimentally determined.

== Regulation ==
=== Transcription ===
==== Promoter ====
There is only one known promoter predicted by Genomatix for the CXorf66 protein on the negative strand from 139047554-139048298 that is 745bp in length. When BLAT Search Alignment was used for the CXorf66 promoter generated, numerous hits with high identity were retrieved for various genes on different chromosomes. The following are a few generated top scoring search results that share a high percent identity:

Name	Gene ID	Score	Span (bp) out of 745	Identity	Chromosome	Strand	Start	End
ZBTB8A	653121	282	656	88.2%	1	-	32994892	32995547
TESK2	10420	263	624	90.3%	1	-	45843093	45843716
TBCK	93627	244	639	91.5%	4	+	107146630	107147268
USP48	84196	241	631	89.0%	1	+	22014725	22015355
PTPN22	26191	227	281	90.0%	1	-	114365307	114365587
PSPH	5723	220	605	90.6%	7	-	56098319	56098923

Uniquely, TESK2 is a testis-specific protein kinase, which correlates with predicted CXorf66 tissue expression.

==== Transcription factors ====
Through the use of Genomatix, a table was generated of the top 20 transcription factors and their binding sites in the CXorf66 promoter (see Figure IV).

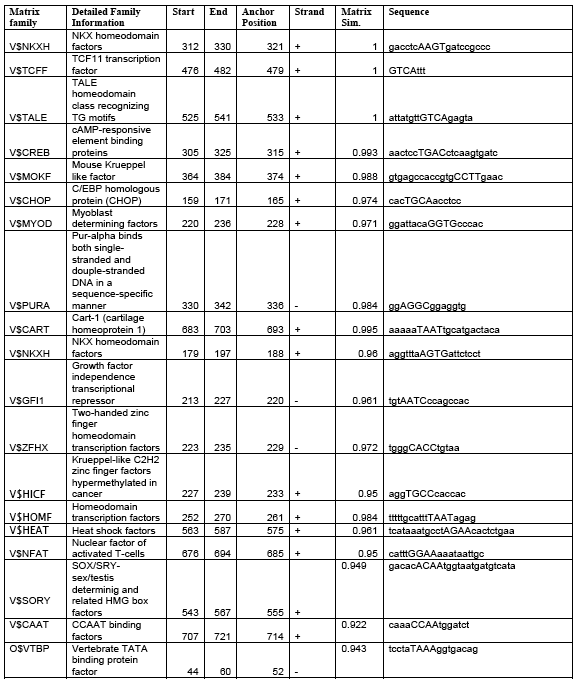
Figure IV: Generated list of transcription factor binding sites in CXorf66 promoter

=== Translation ===
CXorf66 has two miRNAs, hsa-mir-1290 and hsa-miR-4446-5p predicted to bind to the 3' UTR region of the mRNA.

==== Post-translational modifications ====
An N-glycosylation site has been predicted by Expasy's NetNGlyc at NGSS [24aa] with a secondary site also possible at NGTN [21aa]. Utilizing NetPhos, a total of 48 phosphorylation sites have been predicted (41 Serines, 2 Threonines, and 5 Tyrosines), all of which occur after the predicted transmembrane domain, suggesting cytoplasmic topology. Using YinOYang, many O-GlcNAc sites have been predicted. All that include high potential occur after the 48-68aa transmembrane region. A SUMOplot Analysis conducted of Homo sapiens CXorf66 protein, discovered a high probability of a sumoylation motif at position K241, alongside low probability motifs at K316 and K186. With sumoylation having a role in various cellular processes like nuclear-cytosolic transport and transcriptional regulation, it is expected CXorf66 is modified by a SUMO protein post-translation.

==== Subcellular localization ====
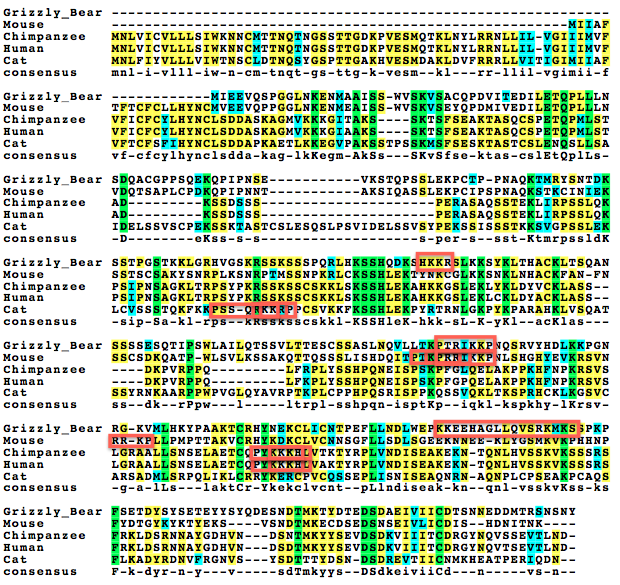
Figure V. CXorf66 Nuclear Localization Signals Across Homologs

Using PSORT II, there is a nuclear localization signal of PYKKKHL at 268aa. This signal can be seen to be conserved in fellow primate species; however, is not present in other mammals. In addition to this, following SDSC's Biology Workbench's SAPS kNN-Prediction, the CXorf66 protein for humans and the mouse homolog have a 47.8% likelihood to end up in the nuclear region of a cell. For more distant homologs, like Bos taurus, that do not have nuclear localization signals however, CXorf66 has a 34.8% likelihood to end up in the extracellular, including cell wall region, or plasma membrane regions. To view several homologs and their nuclear localization signals, see Figure V.

== Homology ==
CXorf66 has no known paralogs in humans; however CXorf66 has conserved homologs throughout the Mammalia kingdom. Highly conserved in primates, a noticeable rapid evolution has been spotted for CXorf66, see Figure VI, explaining the greater number of orthologs in mammals, rather than in invertebrates, birds, and reptiles.

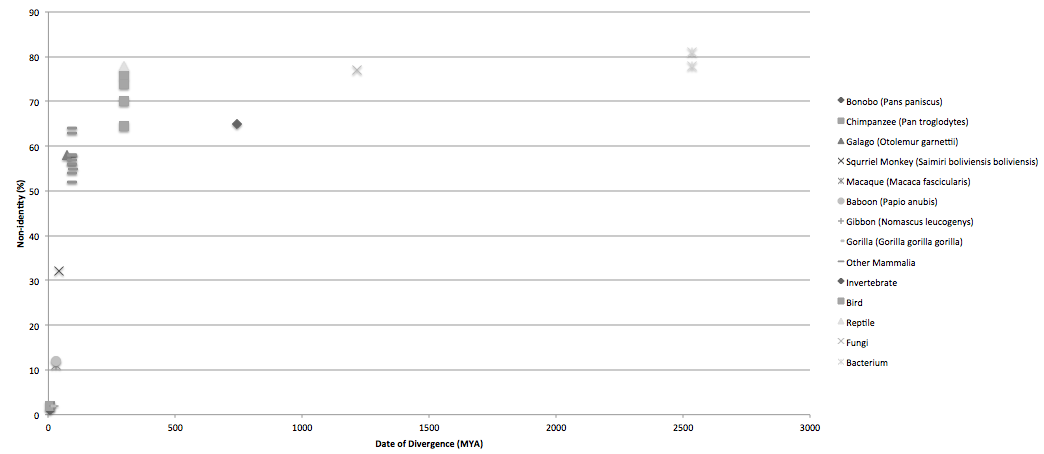
Figure VI. CXorf66 Protein Homolog Divergence

CXorf66 Protein	Species	Date of divergence (MYA)	ncbi accession Number	query cover	E value	Identity
CXorf66 homolog	Chimpanzee (Pan troglodytes)	6.3	XP_001139133.1	100%	0	98%
CXorf66 homolog	Gorilla (Gorilla gorilla gorilla)	8.8	XP_004065002.1	100%	0	98%
LOC631784 isoform X1	Mouse (Mus musculus)	92.3	XP_006528296.1	98%	2E-41	34%
CXorf66-like isoform X1	Rat (Rattus norvegicus)	92.3	XP_001068529.2	84%	6E-32	32%
CXorf66 homolog	Cow (Bos taurus)	94.2	XP_005200949.1	96%	2.00E-46	35%
CXorf66 homolog	White rhino (Ceratotherium simum simum)	94.2	XP_004441715.1	100%	8.00E-86	48%
CXorf66 homolog	Horse (Equus caallus)	94.2	XP_005614614.1	96%	8.00E-58	44%
Neurofilament medium polypeptide	Zebra finch (Taeniopygia guttata)	296	XP_002197538.1	44%	2.00E-08	30%
Triadin-like, partial	Alligator (Alligator mississippiensis)	296	XP_006271227.1	53%	2.00E-12	23%
LOC590028	Sea urchin (Strongylocentrotus purpuratus)	742.9	XP_794743.3	45%	2.00E-05	35.40%
Alpha-L-fucosidase	Streptococcus mitis	2535.8	WP_001083113.1	47%	7.00E-38	22%

== Expression ==
From Unigene's EST cDNA Tissue Abundance display and Protein Atlas, CXorf66 has a moderately high expression levels in testes, in addition to higher expression levels in fetus tissue in comparison to other developmental stages. CXorf66 protein also has a notable low presence in both the control endometrium total RNA and endometriosis total RNA. CXorf66 has been portrayed to have notable presence in the plasma and platelet. Based upon PaxDb data, CXorf66 has been found ranking in the top 5% for one study of human plasma and in the top 25% for another study conducted with human platelet. In addition to this, there has been a noticeable 60–100% CXorf66 protein presence in both non-failing and dilated cardiomyopathy septum tissue. Furthermore, CXorf66 has a ~75% protein presence in peripheral blood mononuclear cells.

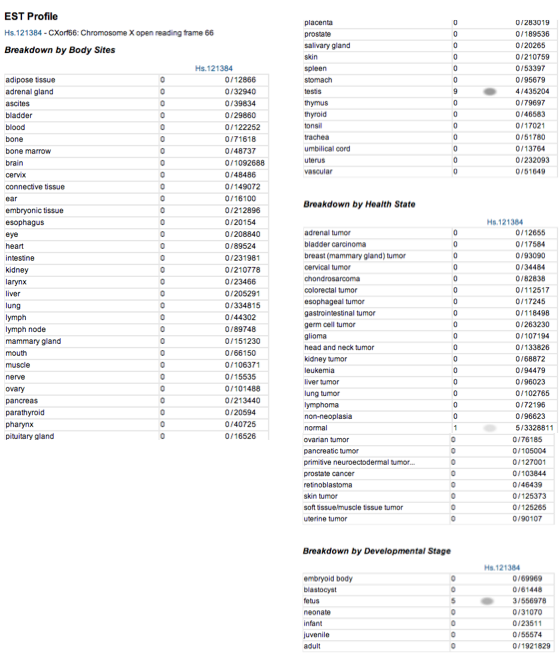
Unigene EST Tissue Expression Data for Human CXorf66 Protein

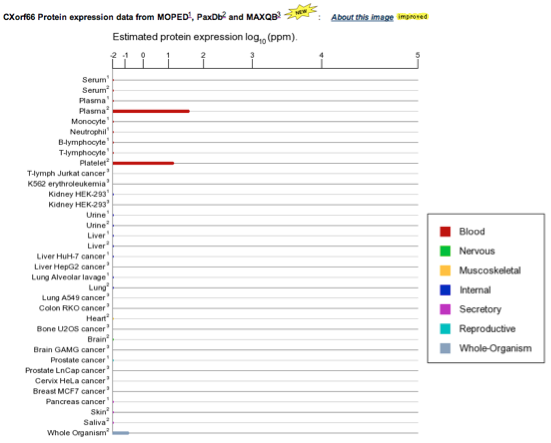
GeneCards Predicted Tissue Expression of Human CXorf66 Protein

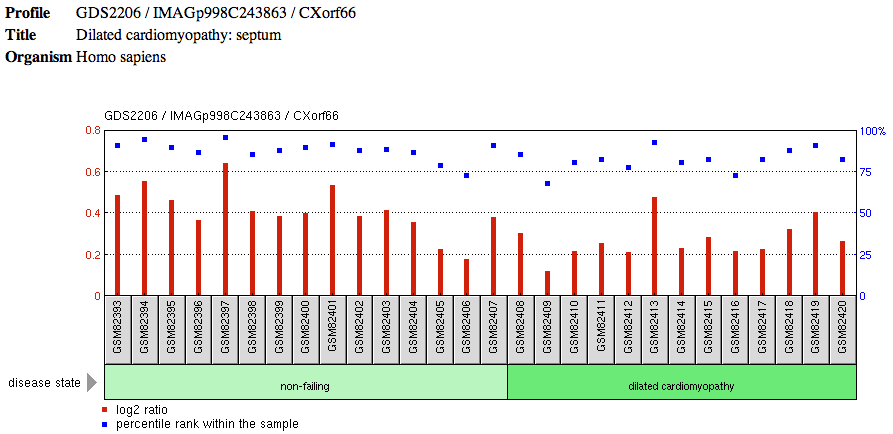
CXorf66 Protein Presence in Dilated Cardiomyopathy Septum Tissue

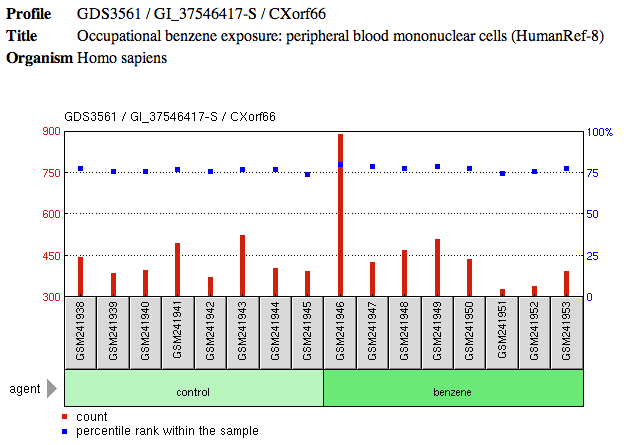
CXorf66 Protein Presence in Peripheral Blood Mononuclear Cells

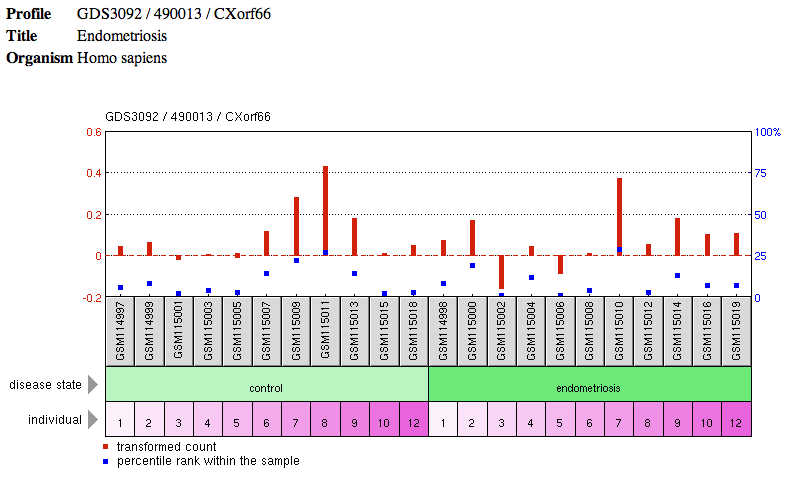
CXorf66 Protein Presence in Endometriosis Total RNA
