= SPMAP1 =

Protein-coding gene in the species Homo sapiens

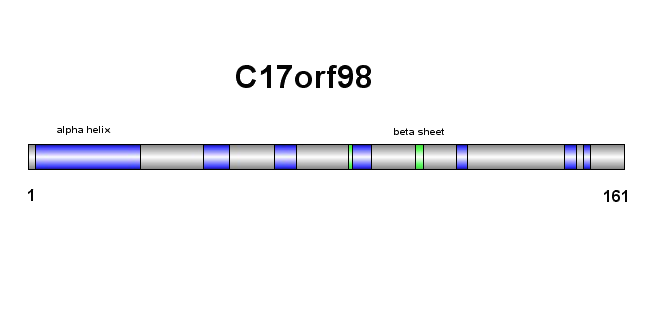

Identifiers
- Aliases: SPMAP1, chromosome 17 open reading frame 98, sperm microtubule associated protein 1
- External IDs: MGI: 1919465; GeneCards: SPMAP1

Gene location (Human)
Chr.	Chromosome 17 (human)
Band	17q12	Start	38,835,086 bp
Band	17q12	End	38,841,438 bp

Gene location (Mouse)
Chr.	Chromosome 11 (mouse)
Band	11|11 D	Start	97,662,307 bp
Band	11|11 D	End	97,666,744 bp
RNA expression pattern
Bgee	Human / Mouse (ortholog); Top expressed in: testicle; left testis; right testis; gonad; mucosa of transverse colon; granulocyte; right adrenal cortex; left adrenal cortex; gastric mucosa; stromal cell of endometrium / Top expressed in: seminiferous tubule; spermatid; blastocyst; spermatocyte; embryo; embryo; zygote; superior frontal gyrus; neural layer of retina; cerebellar cortex; More reference expression data
BioGPS	n/a
Orthologs
Databases	NCBI: entry; OMA: entry
Species	Human	Mouse
Entrez	388381	72215
Ensembl	ENSG00000275489; ENSG00000276913	ENSMUSG00000018543
UniProt	A8MV24	Q9DAQ5
RefSeq (mRNA)	NM_001080465	NM_028156
RefSeq (protein)	NP_001073934	NP_082432
Location (UCSC)	Chr 17: 38.84 – 38.84 Mb	Chr 11: 97.66 – 97.67 Mb
PubMed search
- Wikidata
View/Edit Human	View/Edit Mouse

Sperm microtubule associated protein 1 is a protein which in humans is encoded by the SPMAP1 gene. The protein is derived from Homo sapiens chromosome 17. The SPMAP1 gene consists of a 6,302 base sequence. Its mRNA has three exons and no alternative splice sites. The protein has 154 amino acids, with no abnormal amino acid levels. SPMAP1 has a domain of unknown function (DUF4542) and is 17.6kDa in weight. SPMAP1 does not belong to any other families nor does it have any isoforms. The protein has orthologs with high percent similarity in mammals and reptiles. The protein has additional distantly related orthologs across the metazoan kingdom, culminating with the sponge family.

Like most proteins, SPMAP1 is known to be highly expressed in the testes. The protein has also been known to have elevated levels in cancer. The protein has been shown to be expressed in proximity to or within intermediate filaments and the nucleolus. Additionally, SPMAP1 has transcription factors which are also active in hematopoietic stem cells, the immune system, and the cardiovascular system, among others. The gene is over-expressed in many cancer types, including kidney renal clear cell carcinoma and lung squamous cell carcinoma. Motif and transcription factor analysis points towards SPMAP1 playing a role in proliferation, specially in immune cell proliferation.

== Gene ==
=== Background ===
The SPMAP1 gene consists of 6,303 bases. It has three exons and two large introns. The gene has no alternative splice sites. The 5' UTR sequence of SPMAP1 is highly conserved in primates. No non-mammalian 5' UTR matches were able to be determined. SPMAP1 has 11 Alu repeats.

=== Enhancers ===
GeneCards determined that SPMAP1 has five enhancer sequences. The role of the sequences may provide insight into the function of SPMAP1. Four of the five enhancers are active in the thymus. All five enhancers are active in the H1 hESC. Additionally, all five enhancers are active in iPS DF 19.11 derived from foreskin fibroblasts.

=== Transcription factors ===
The SPMAP1 promoter has many transcription factors binding sites. SPMAP1's transcription factors are commonly found in hematopoietic cells, connective tissue, cardiovascular tissue, and the immune system. The presence of Krueppel Like Transcription Factors suggests a role for SPMAP1 in proliferation or apoptosis. The presence of SMAD indicates an involvement in the TGF-β pathway, while the presence of Myc related transcription factors indicates a potential proliferation function of the protein. Additionally, other SPMAP1 transcription factors, like RBPJ-Kappa are involved in proliferation and signalling.

=== Variants ===
Numerous SNPs were found in the 5' UTR, 3' UTR, and coding region of SPMAP1. Few SNPs were found in highly conserved regions. In all, four SNPs were found in the highly conserved amino acids. One SNP was found in the start codon sequence. Of these five, three had a SNP on the third position of the codon. Due to the wobble hypothesis, three of the five SNPs would have no effect on the overall protein structure.

=== mRNA ===
SPMAP1 does not have any miRNA binding sites. Its mRNA has low abundance (0.44%). The mRNA sequence has three hexaloops, none of which are significant.

== Protein ==
=== Primary structure ===
SPMAP1 is a 17.6kDa protein. Distant orthologs are 5 to 6 kDa larger, but some of the discrepancies come from an added NLS sequence, which Homo sapiens does not have There are no positive or negative charge clusters. There are no transmembrane components. The isoelectric point is 9.80 / 17564.67 pI/Mw. SPMAP1 is hydrophobic and soluble.

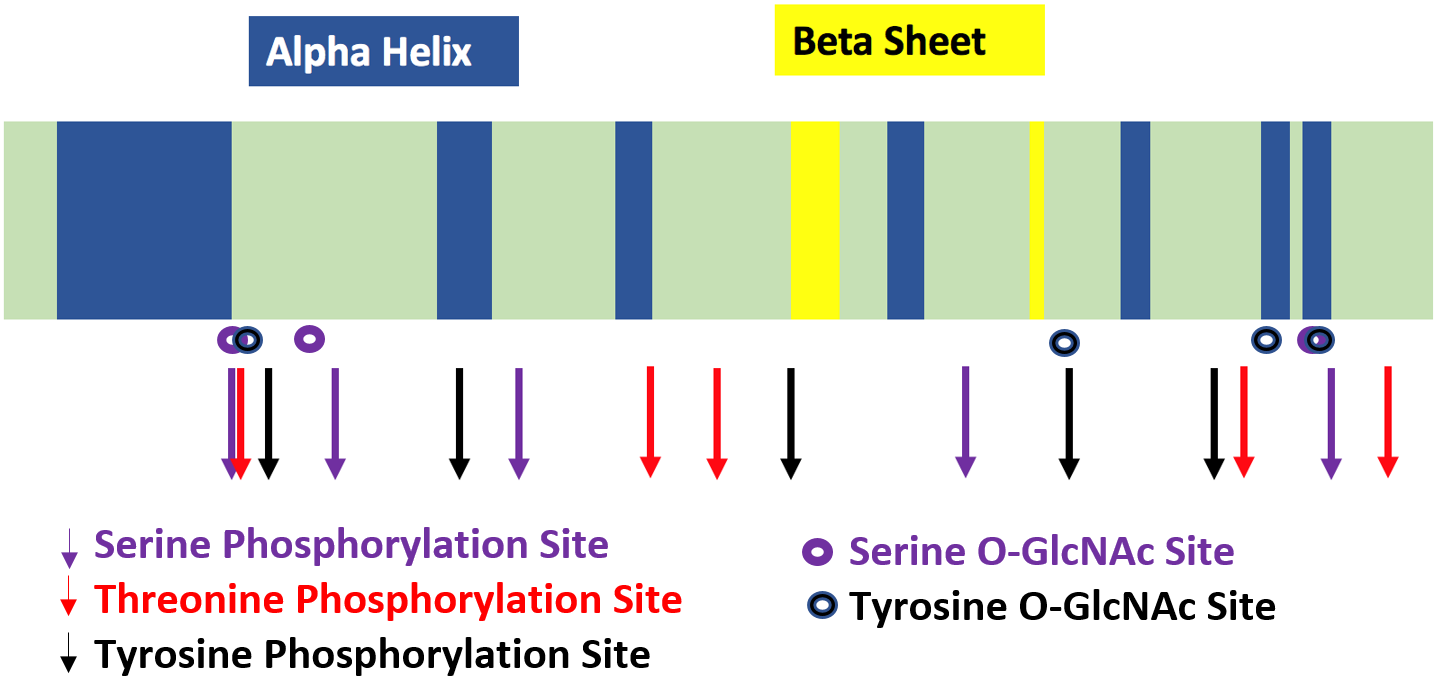
Secondary structure and phosphorylation sites

=== Secondary and tertiary structure ===
Secondary structure of SPMAP1 consists of both beta sheets and alpha helices (see diagram on right). Results are confirmed in the tertiary structure, however, alpha helix and beta sheet numbers differ slightly (see diagram on right).

=== Motifs and binding sites ===
There are no N-terminal signal peptides. Cleavage motifs were not found. There are no ER membrane retention signals, nor peroxisomal targeting signal. SKL2 is not present, thus a secondary peroxisome signal is not present. There are no vacuolar targeting signals. There are no RNA binding motifs or actinin type actin binding motifs. There are no N-myristoylation pattern or prenylation patterns.

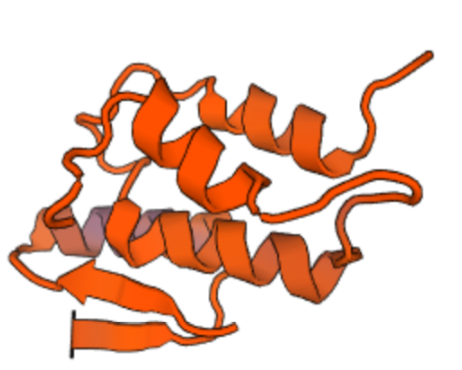
SWISS-MODEL 3D structure of SPMAP1

Kinase finder at Cuckoo determined kinase binding sites for SPMAP1. There are many Serine/Threonine, and Tyrosine kinase phosphorylation sites. Serine and Threonine kinase binding sites are the most prevalent above the statistically significant threshold. There are no SUMOylation sites. SPMAP1 gene has six sites on the sequence of possible O-GlcNAc sites. Highly conserved O-GlcNAc amino acid sites are 24, 32, 117, and 142. O-GlcNAc post-translational modification occurs on Ser/Thr residues, specifically on oncogenes, tumor suppressors, and proteins involved in growth factor signaling.

SPMAP1 has a Caspase3/7 motif, where either Caspase 3 or 7 would cleave. This supports the idea that SPMAP1 is involved in proliferation, as a proapoptotic caspase would want to destroy any protein driving proliferation. The protein also has a motif where peptidyl-prolyl cis-trans isomerase NIMA interacting 1 (Pin1) binds. Pin1 upregulation is involved in cancer and immune disorders. This supports the claim that SPMAP1 is involved in cancer, immune cells, and perhaps cancers of the immune system. Additionally, SPMAP1 protein has an IBM site, where inhibitors of apoptosis (IAPs) bind. This again supports the idea of SPMAP1 being involved in inhibiting apoptosis, and logically, driving cancer. Furthermore, SPMAP1 has motifs where GRB2's SH2 domain binds. GRB2 is an adapter protein involved in the RAS signaling pathway, a pathway that when deregulated drives uncontrolled proliferation.

=== Amino acid sequence ===
A duplication may have occurred at positions 59–71.

Homo sapiens

MAYLSECRLRLEKGFILDGVAVSTAARAYGRSRPKLWSAIPPYNAQQDYHARSYFQ SHVVPPLLRVVPPLLRKTDQDHGGTGRDGWIVDYIHIFGQGQRYLNRRNWAGTGHS LQQVTGHDHYNADLKPIDGFNGRFGYRRNTPALRQSTSVFGEVTHFPLF

=== Associated proteins ===
There are no known associated proteins.

== Expression ==
Protein abundance in Homo sapiens whole organism is quite low. No data is available for other species. Allen Brain Atlas yields no brain atlas for SPMAP1.

=== Subcellular localization ===
SPMAP1 protein has been found to be expressed in the intermediate filaments and the nucleoli. A SPMAP1 antibody is available from Sigma-Aldrich. Additionally, SPMAP1 localizes in the cytoplasm. Distantly related SPMAP1 orthologs in organisms such as Macrostomum lignano and Amphimedon queenslandica exhibit nuclear expression. Nuclear localization signals are present in distantly related organisms in non-conserved sites. The results of the k-NN prediction is cytoplasmic localization. SPMAP1 is not a signal peptide. The protein is a soluble.

=== Tissue ===
Like most proteins, SPMAP1 protein is highly expressed in the testes. The protein is expressed on adult tissues as well as fetal tissue. The protein has been found to be mildly expressed in connective tissue. Additionally, expression has been seen in the sperm, breast epithelial cells, and various cells of the immune system.

== Clinical significance ==
=== Cancer ===
Protein expression is elevated in many cancer patients. Specifically, protein expression has been shown to be high on colorectal, breast, prostate, and lung. SPMAP1 is expressed in papillary thyroid cancer as well. Additionally, mutations were found in SPMAP1 in endometrial, stomach, coloratura, and kidney cancer. SPMAP1 expression is elevated in cancer patients with BRCA. In kidney renal clear cell carcinoma patients, SPMAP1 expression dramatically decreased compared to the non cancerous state. In 80% of chromophobe renal cell carcinoma patients, at least one gene duplication SPMAP1 was present.

=== Other conditions ===
Protein expression is lower in males with teratozoospermia as compared to those without. Many Geo Profile experiments have been conducted with SPMAP1, however, none yield data showing significant change in expression.

== Evolution ==
SPMAP1 is a slow mutating protein. It resembles cytochrome c in its rate of divergence, as determined by the molecular clock equations.

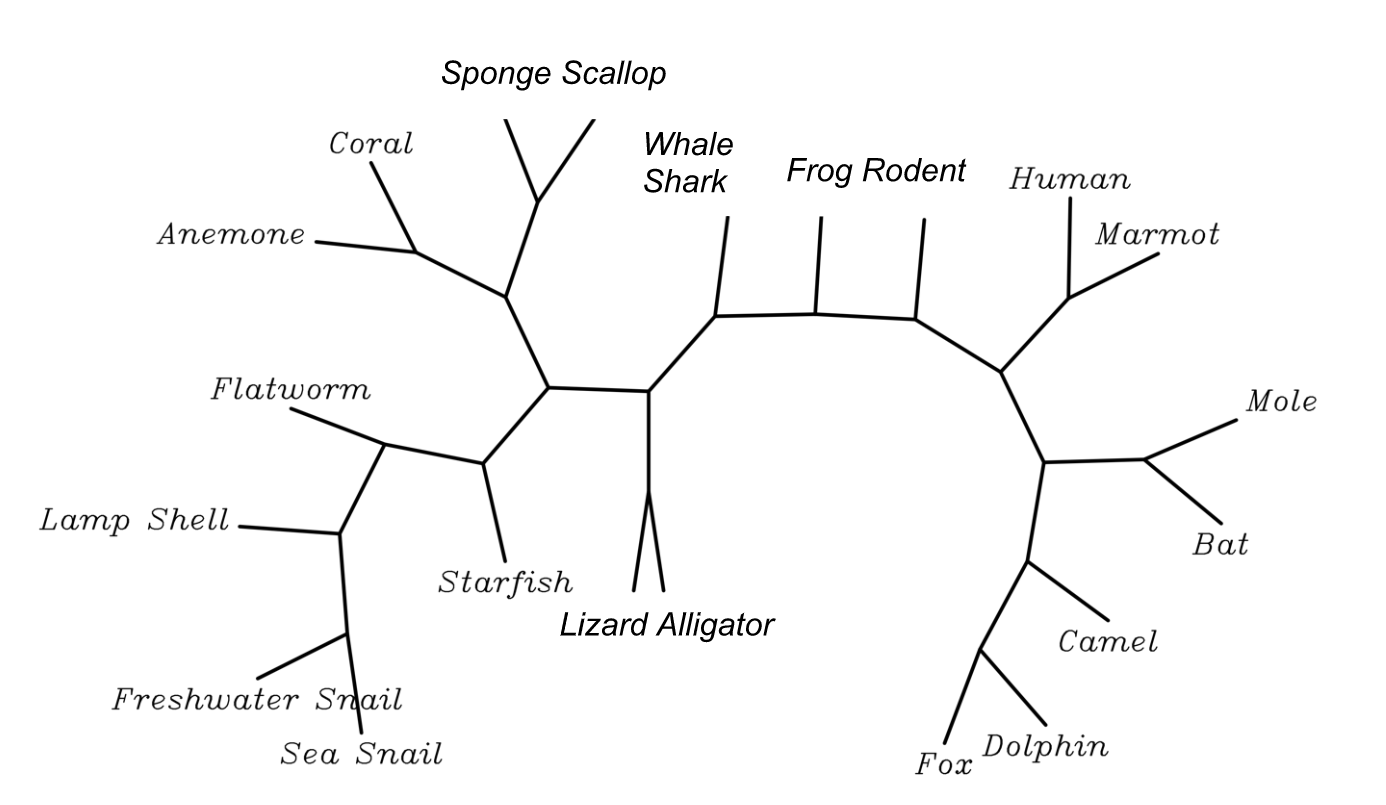
Unrooted SPMAP1 Phylogenetic Tree with 20 orthologs (see table below)

=== Paralogs ===
There are no known Homo sapiens paralogs for SPMAP1.

=== Orthologs ===
SPMAP1 protein has additional distantly related orthologs across the metazoan kingdom. Its most distant relative is in the sponge family. There is no known ortholog in ctenophores, nematodes, bacteria, fungus, plants, or zebrafish. There are only two fish with the SPMAP1 gene. Model organisms such as Caenorhabditis elegans, and Drosophila melanogaster, do not have the gene.

SPMAP1 Orthologs

Sequence #	Genus and species	Common name	Accession #	Protein length	MYA Div	Seq Id	Confidence
1	Homo sapiens	Human	NP_001073934	154	0	100%	na
2	Camelus ferus	Wild Bactrian camel	XP_006176436	154	96	83%	2.00E-94
3	Pteropus alecto	Black flying fox	XP_006924784	154	96	81%	1.00E-92
4	Lipotes vexilifer	Yangtze river dolphin	XP_007465208	154	96	81%	6.00E-89
5	Condylura cristat	Star-nosed mole	XP_004684322	154	96	75%	5.00E-78
6	Myotis brandtii	Brandt's bat	EPQ05064	171	96	78%	6.00E-78
7	Marmata marmata marmata	Alpine marmot	XP_015362150.1	154	90	81%	3.00E-94
8	Octodon degus	Chilean rodent	XP_004633931	153	90	73%	1.00E-76
9	Alligator sinensis	Chinese alligator	XP_006022630	154	312	63%	8.00E-68
10	Anolis carolinensis	Lizard	XP_003222553	154	312	62%	6.00E-67
11	Xenopus laevis	African clawed frog	XP_018090228	244	352	51%	4.00E-38
12	Rhincodon typus	Whale shark	XP_020388051.1	164	476	53%	5.00E-52
13	Acanthaster planci	Starfish	XP_022086463	209	684	48%	1.00E-37
14	Mizuhopecten yessoensis	Scallop	XP_021340301	275	797	45%	5.00E-06
15	Lottia gigantea	Sea snail	XP_009063876	173	797	45%	2.00E-37
16	Lingula anatine	Lamp shell	XP_013388744.1	211	797	43%	2.00E-35
17	Biomphalaria glabrata	Freshwater snail	XP_013088317	198	797	41%	6.00E-15
18	Nematostella vectensis	Sea anemone	XP_001629616	173	824	48%	2.00E-35
19	Stylophora pistillata	Coral	XP_022795125	226	824	46%	3.00E-38
20	Macrostonum lignano	Flatworm	PAA73615	235	824	36%	4.00E-25
21	Amphimedon queenslandica	Sponge	XP_003389909	275	951.8	32%	2.00E-12
