= Zinc finger protein 557 =

Protein found in humans

ZNF557

Identifiers
- Aliases: ZNF557, zinc finger protein 557
- External IDs: GeneCards: ZNF557

Gene location (Human)
Chr.	Chromosome 19 (human)
Band	19p13.2	Start	7,069,703 bp
Band	19p13.2	End	7,087,968 bp
RNA expression pattern
Bgee	Human / Mouse (ortholog); Top expressed in: testicle; Achilles tendon; granulocyte; gonad; stromal cell of endometrium; ganglionic eminence; ventricular zone; monocyte; islet of Langerhans; epithelium of colon / n/a; More reference expression data
BioGPS	n/a
Gene ontology
Molecular function	DNA binding; metal ion binding; nucleic acid binding; DNA-binding transcription factor activity, RNA polymerase II-specific
Cellular component	intracellular anatomical structure; nucleus
Biological process	regulation of transcription, DNA-templated; transcription, DNA-templated; regulation of transcription by RNA polymerase II
Sources:Amigo / QuickGO
Orthologs
Databases	NCBI: entry; OMA: entry
Species	Human	Mouse
Entrez	79230	n/a
Ensembl	ENSG00000130544	n/a
UniProt	Q8N988	n/a
RefSeq (mRNA)	NM_024341; NM_001044387; NM_001044388	n/a
RefSeq (protein)	NP_001037852; NP_001037853; NP_077317	n/a
Location (UCSC)	Chr 19: 7.07 – 7.09 Mb	n/a
PubMed search		n/a
- Wikidata
View/Edit Human

Zinc finger protein 557 is a protein that in humans is encoded by the ZNF557 gene.
