= TESK2 =

Protein-coding gene in humans

Identifiers
- Aliases: TESK2, testis-specific kinase 2, testis associated actin remodelling kinase 2
- External IDs: OMIM: 604746; MGI: 2385204; GeneCards: TESK2
Enzyme activity
EC #	BRENDA	ExPASy	KEGG	MetaCyc
2.7.12.1	↗	↗	↗	↗

Gene location (Human)
Chr.	Chromosome 1 (human)
Band	1p34.1	Start	45,343,883 bp
Band	1p34.1	End	45,491,163 bp

Gene location (Mouse)
Chr.	Chromosome 4 (mouse)
Band	4|4 D1	Start	116,578,145 bp
Band	4|4 D1	End	116,663,153 bp
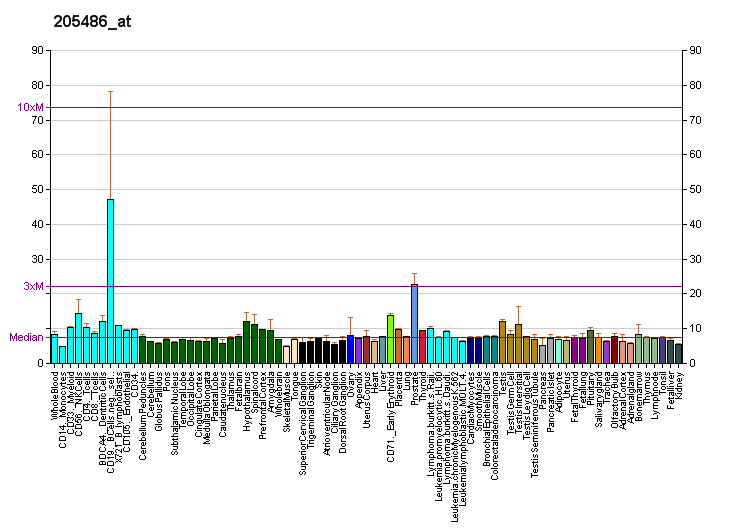
RNA expression pattern
Bgee	Human / Mouse (ortholog); Top expressed in: cartilage tissue; C1 segment; secondary oocyte; skin of abdomen; jejunal mucosa; skin of limb; skin of leg; duodenum; skin of arm; testicle / Top expressed in: granulocyte; spermatid; lobe of prostate; sciatic nerve; utricle; seminiferous tubule; vestibular membrane of cochlear duct; left colon; stria vascularis; jejunum; More reference expression data
BioGPS	More reference expression data
Gene ontology
Molecular function	transferase activity; protein kinase activity; protein serine/threonine/tyrosine kinase activity; protein tyrosine kinase activity; nucleotide binding; protein binding; ATP binding; metal ion binding; kinase activity; protein serine/threonine kinase activity; signal transducer activity
Cellular component	nucleoplasm; nucleus; cytoplasm; nuclear body
Biological process	protein phosphorylation; peptidyl-tyrosine phosphorylation; focal adhesion assembly; actin cytoskeleton organization; spermatogenesis; phosphorylation; intracellular signal transduction
Sources:Amigo / QuickGO
Orthologs
Databases	NCBI: entry; OMA: entry
Species	Human	Mouse
Entrez	10420	230661
Ensembl	ENSG00000070759	ENSMUSG00000033985
UniProt	Q96S53	Q8VCT9
RefSeq (mRNA)	NM_007170; NM_001320800	NM_146151
RefSeq (protein)	NP_001307729; NP_009101	NP_666263
Location (UCSC)	Chr 1: 45.34 – 45.49 Mb	Chr 4: 116.58 – 116.66 Mb
PubMed search
- Wikidata
View/Edit Human	View/Edit Mouse

Dual specificity testis-specific protein kinase 2 is an enzyme that in humans is encoded by the TESK2 gene.

== Function ==
This gene product is a serine/threonine protein kinase that contains an N-terminal protein kinase domain that is structurally similar to the kinase domains of testis-specific protein kinase-1 and the LIM motif-containing protein kinases (LIMKs). Its overall structure is most related to the former, indicating that it belongs to the TESK subgroup of the LIMK/TESK family of protein kinases. This gene is predominantly expressed in testis and prostate. The developmental expression pattern of the rat gene in testis suggests an important role for this gene in meiotic stages and/or early stages of spermiogenesis.
