= USP48 =

Protein-coding gene in humans

Identifiers
- Aliases: USP48, RAP1GA1, USP31, ubiquitin specific peptidase 48
- External IDs: OMIM: 617445; MGI: 2158502; GeneCards: USP48
Enzyme activity
EC #	BRENDA	ExPASy	KEGG	MetaCyc
3.4.19.12	↗	↗	↗	↗

Gene location (Human)
Chr.	Chromosome 1 (human)
Band	1p36.12	Start	21,678,298 bp
Band	1p36.12	End	21,783,606 bp

Gene location (Mouse)
Chr.	Chromosome 4 (mouse)
Band	4|4 D3	Start	137,593,755 bp
Band	4|4 D3	End	137,658,537 bp
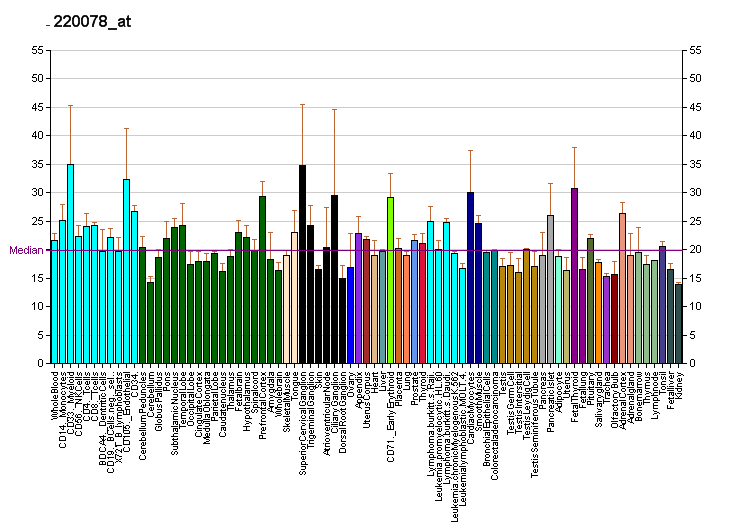

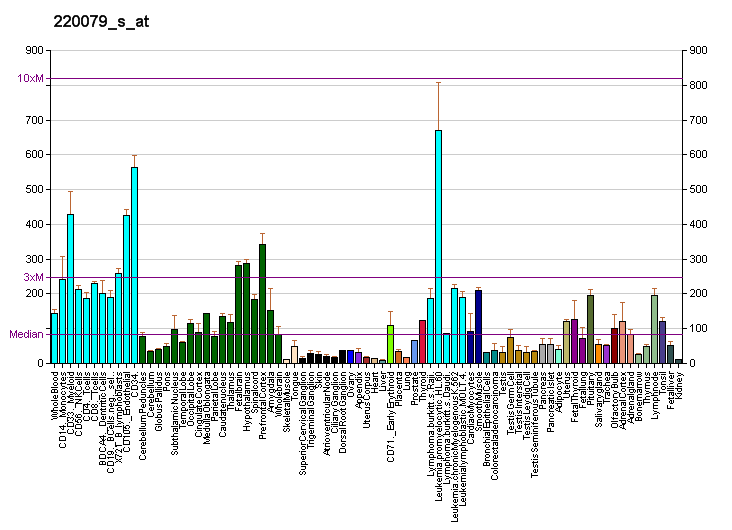

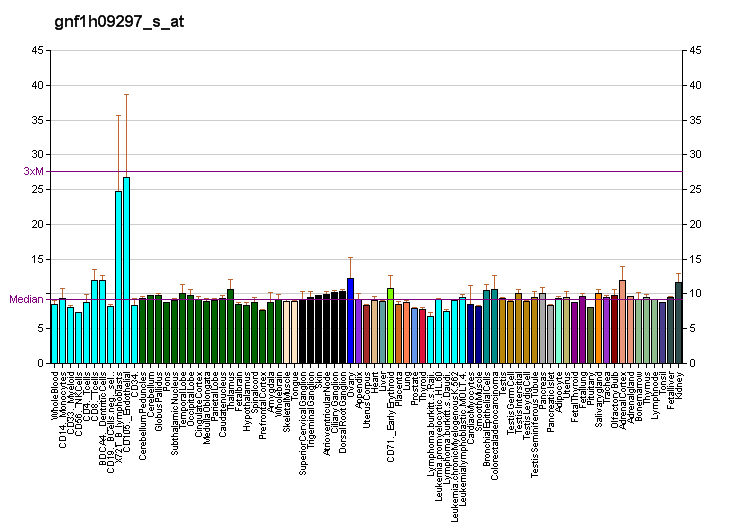
RNA expression pattern
Bgee	Human / Mouse (ortholog); Top expressed in: Achilles tendon; cerebellar hemisphere; right hemisphere of cerebellum; endothelial cell; right adrenal cortex; Brodmann area 23; Epithelium of choroid plexus; left adrenal cortex; optic nerve; sural nerve / Top expressed in: neural layer of retina; morula; morula; blastocyst; tail of embryo; Rostral migratory stream; genital tubercle; superior frontal gyrus; cerebellar cortex; spermatid; More reference expression data
BioGPS	More reference expression data
Gene ontology
Molecular function	cysteine-type peptidase activity; peptidase activity; hydrolase activity; thiol-dependent deubiquitinase; cysteine-type endopeptidase activity
Cellular component	nucleus; mitochondrion; nucleoplasm; cytoplasm; cytosol
Biological process	proteolysis; ubiquitin-dependent protein catabolic process; protein deubiquitination
Sources:Amigo / QuickGO
Orthologs
Databases	NCBI: entry; OMA: entry
Species	Human	Mouse
Entrez	84196	170707
Ensembl	ENSG00000090686	ENSMUSG00000043411
UniProt	Q86UV5	Q3V0C5
RefSeq (mRNA)	NM_001032730; NM_032236; NM_001330394; NM_001350164; NM_001350166 NM_001350167; NM_001350168	NM_130879; NM_001347227; NM_001355588
RefSeq (protein)	NP_001027902; NP_001317323; NP_115612; NP_001337093; NP_001337095 NP_001337096; NP_001337097	NP_001334156; NP_570949; NP_001342517; NP_001392866; NP_001392867 NP_001392868; NP_001392869; NP_001392871; NP_001392872; NP_001392873; NP_001392880; NP_001392881; NP_001392882; NP_001392883; NP_001392884
Location (UCSC)	Chr 1: 21.68 – 21.78 Mb	Chr 4: 137.59 – 137.66 Mb
PubMed search
- Wikidata
View/Edit Human	View/Edit Mouse

Ubiquitin carboxyl-terminal hydrolase 48 is an enzyme that in humans is encoded by the USP48 gene.

This gene encodes a protein containing domains that associate it with the peptidase family C19, also known as family 2 of ubiquitin carboxyl-terminal hydrolases. Family members function as deubiquitinating enzymes, recognizing and hydrolyzing the peptide bond at the C-terminal glycine of ubiquitin. Enzymes in peptidase family C19 are involved in the processing of poly-ubiquitin precursors as well as that of ubiquitinated proteins. Alternate transcriptional splice variants, encoding different isoforms, have been characterized.

In melanocytic cells USP48 gene expression may be regulated by MITF.
