= OR4M1 =

Protein-coding gene in the species Homo sapiens

Identifiers
- Aliases: OR4M1, OR14-7, olfactory receptor family 4 subfamily M member 1
- External IDs: MGI: 3030568; GeneCards: OR4M1

Gene location (Human)
Chr.	Chromosome 14 (human)
Band	14q11.2	Start	19,773,504 bp
Band	14q11.2	End	19,783,696 bp

Gene location (Mouse)
Chr.	Chromosome 14 (mouse)
Band	14|14 C1	Start	50,553,963 bp
Band	14|14 C1	End	50,564,218 bp
RNA expression pattern
Bgee	Human / Mouse (ortholog); Top expressed in: testicle; right testis; left testis; bone marrow / Top expressed in: respiratory epithelium; nasal epithelium; peripheral nervous system; olfactory epithelium; More reference expression data
BioGPS	n/a
Gene ontology
Molecular function	G protein-coupled receptor activity; olfactory receptor activity; transmembrane signaling receptor activity; signal transducer activity
Cellular component	integral component of membrane; plasma membrane; membrane
Biological process	sensory perception of smell; detection of chemical stimulus involved in sensory perception of smell; detection of chemical stimulus involved in sensory perception; signal transduction; response to stimulus; G protein-coupled receptor signaling pathway
Sources:Amigo / QuickGO
Orthologs
Databases	NCBI: entry; OMA: entry
Species	Human	Mouse
Entrez	441670	258658
Ensembl	ENSG00000176299	ENSMUSG00000045306
UniProt	Q8NGD0	Q8VFT4
RefSeq (mRNA)	NM_001005500	NM_146664
RefSeq (protein)	NP_001005500	NP_666875
Location (UCSC)	Chr 14: 19.77 – 19.78 Mb	Chr 14: 50.55 – 50.56 Mb
PubMed search
- Wikidata
View/Edit Human	View/Edit Mouse

Olfactory receptor 4M1 is a protein that in humans is encoded by the OR4M1 gene.

Olfactory receptors interact with odorant molecules in the nose, to initiate a neuronal response that triggers the perception of a smell. The olfactory receptor proteins are members of a large family of G-protein-coupled receptors (GPCR) arising from single coding-exon genes. Olfactory receptors share a 7-transmembrane domain structure with many neurotransmitter and hormone receptors and are responsible for the recognition and G protein-mediated transduction of odorant signals. The olfactory receptor gene family is the largest in the genome. The nomenclature assigned to the olfactory receptor genes and proteins for this organism is independent of other organisms.

== See also ==
- Olfactory receptor
