= C5orf22 =

Protein-coding gene in the species Homo sapiens

Identifiers
- Aliases: C5orf22, chromosome 5 open reading frame 22
- External IDs: MGI: 1925127; HomoloGene: 10149; GeneCards: C5orf22; OMA:C5orf22 - orthologs

Gene location (Human)
Chr.	Chromosome 5 (human)
Band	5p13.3	Start	31,532,287 bp
Band	5p13.3	End	31,555,053 bp

Gene location (Mouse)
Chr.	Chromosome 15 (mouse)
Band	15|15 A1	Start	12,808,263 bp
Band	15|15 A1	End	12,824,735 bp
RNA expression pattern
Bgee	Human / Mouse (ortholog); Top expressed in: secondary oocyte; Skeletal muscle tissue of biceps brachii; hair follicle; mucosa of sigmoid colon; epithelium of nasopharynx; Achilles tendon; gastrocnemius muscle; Epithelium of choroid plexus; palpebral conjunctiva; right ventricle / Top expressed in: zygote; Paneth cell; fetal liver hematopoietic progenitor cell; secondary oocyte; primary oocyte; saccule; triceps brachii muscle; substantia nigra; otic vesicle; vastus lateralis muscle; More reference expression data
BioGPS	n/a
Orthologs
Species	Human	Mouse
Entrez	55322	77877
Ensembl	ENSG00000082213	ENSMUSG00000022195
UniProt	Q49AR2	Q8BGC1
RefSeq (mRNA)	NM_018356	NM_001166360; NM_029998; NM_001357761
RefSeq (protein)	NP_060826	NP_001159832; NP_084274; NP_001344690
Location (UCSC)	Chr 5: 31.53 – 31.56 Mb	Chr 15: 12.81 – 12.82 Mb
PubMed search
- Wikidata
View/Edit Human	View/Edit Mouse

Chromosome 5 open reading frame 22 (c5orf22) is a protein-coding gene of poorly characterized function in Homo sapiens. The primary alias is unknown protein family 0489 (UPF0489).

== Gene ==
C5orf22 is located on the positive strand of Chromosome 5 at 5P13.3, spanning 22,779 nucleotides, from base pair 31532275 to 31555053. C5orf22 encodes 9 total exons and contains 7 isoforms. Isoform variants differ in their exon configuration and untranslated region. Transcript variant 1 is the canonical isoform, encoding 442 amino acids across 9 exons.

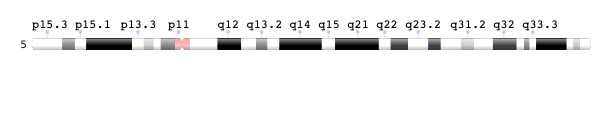
Annotated human chromosome 5. Retrieved from NCBI Gene.

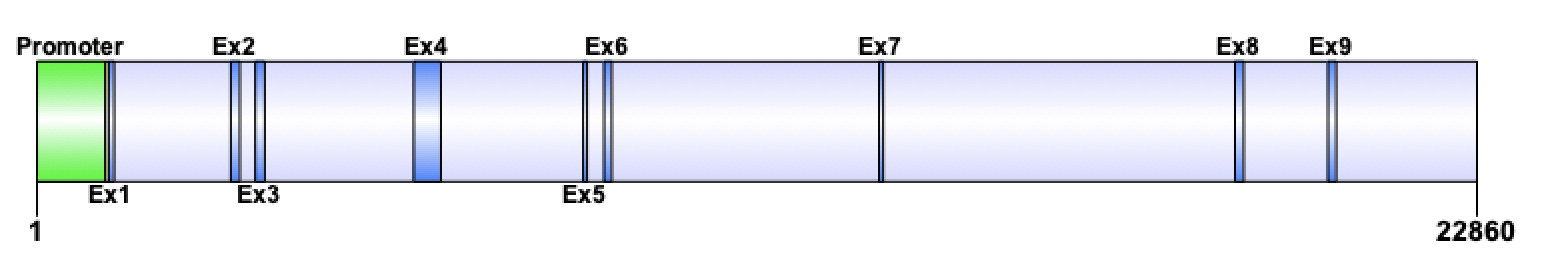
C5orf22 gene diagram. Human C5orf22 is located on chromosome 5 (5p13.3) at base pair 31,532,275 to 31,555,053. Transcript variant 1 (depicted above) encodes 9 exons.1 Promoter prediction is from Genomatix. The GXP# for the promoter is GXP_55076. Pro1, is the assigned promoter for all transcript variants. This promoter lies directly upstream from the 5’ UTR and spans 1,081 base pairs. Promoter is labeled in green. Exons (Ex) are denoted in dark blue. Illustration was created using Domain Illustrator.21

=== Expression and regulation ===
C5orf22 displays ubiquitous RNA expression across tissue types from all 3 germ layers and from all phases of development in humans, mice, chickens, and zebrafish. There are statistically significant differences in RNA expression between select tissues, with skeletal muscle containing the greatest abundance (7.8 RPKM)

C5orf22 contains 1 predicted promoter directly upstream of the gene (GXP_55076). This promoter is 1,081 base pairs and partially overlaps with the 5’ untranslated region. GXP_55076 is assigned to all transcript variants. Transcription factor binding elements consist of TATA box binding elements, SMAD transcription factors, MAF/AP1 binding factors, and several others.

=== Neighboring elements ===
C5orf22 closest neighboring element is Drosha, a ribonuclease which is encoded by the minus strand proximal to C5orf22. Drosha is a double stranded endoribonuclease that assists with the first step of microRNA biogenesis.

== Structure ==
C5orf22 contains 2 globular domains and 3 small disordered regions. The molecular-weight is approximately 50 kDa. The isoelectric point is 4.7. C5orf22 contains relatively average amino acid proportions compared to most proteins. There were no significant outliers in abundance of individual amino acids. C5orf22 contains several predicted post-translational modifications including phosphorylation sites, ubiquitination sites, glycosylation sites, SH2 domain, and a myristylation site.

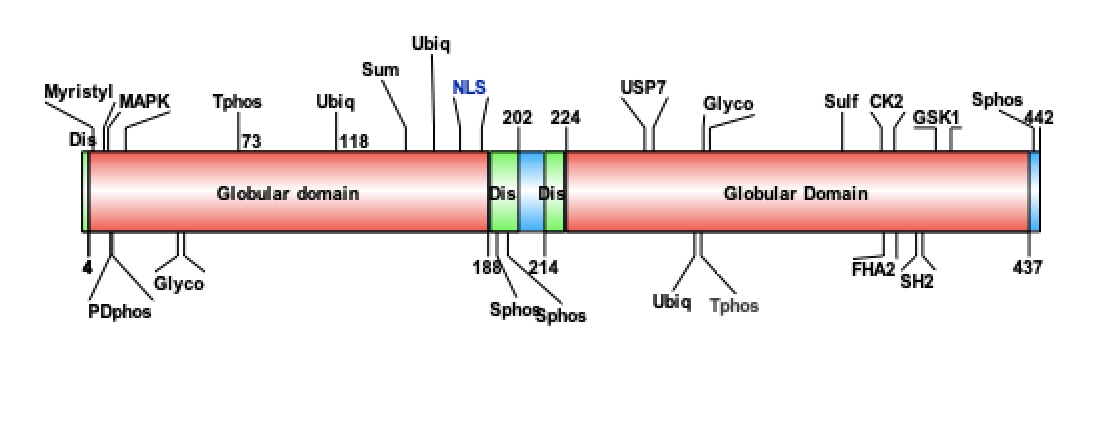
C5orf22 protein structure contains 2 globular domains and 3 disordered regions.

== Subcellular distribution ==
C5orf22 is most likely to exist as a soluble protein located within the cytoplasm and nucleus. Amino acid sequence predictions and immunohistochemical staining support the localization of C5orf22 to cytoplasm and nucleus. Furthermore, amino acid sequence analysis indicated a predicted partial nuclear localization signal (NLS) from AA 175-185.

== Function ==
The precise function of C5orf22 is still unknown however it is hypothesized to be a component of a DNA splicing complex. Proteomic research implicated the protein product as a novel component of the WBP11/PQBP1 splicing complex which regulates expression of genes involved in a spectrum of processes ranging from DNA repair to immunomodulation. C5orf22 knockdown was associated with downregulation of alternative splicing events that led to aberrant gene expression of select genes and ultimately cell cycle dysfunction. Cell localization evidence and the presence of a NLS further support this hypothesized function.

== Interacting proteins ==
Experimental evidence has indicated over 20 interactors with C5orf22. Interactants are localized to both the nucleus and cytoplasm. The most likely interactors are WBP11, OSM, Surf2, ELOF1, and DDITL4.

== Evolution & homology ==
C5orf22 initially appeared in invertebrates approximately 797 million years ago. It is the only member of its gene family. Human UPF0489 C5orf22 is conserved through invertebrates. C5orf22 orthologs showed conservation of the two globular domains through bony fish and conservation of 1 globular domain within arthropods. Isoelectric point and molecular weights of C5orf22 orthologs were within ∓ 0.15 and ∓ 3kDa through bony fish. There are no paralogs to c5orf22 in humans.

UPF0489 C5orf22 is slow evolving protein, based on comparisons of the percent corrected divergence of orthologous proteins.

Table 1: C5orf22 orthologs
Taxonomic Class	Common name	Genus species	Date of Divergence Millions of Years Ago (MYA)	Sequence Identity (%)	Sequence Similarity (%)	Sequence Length (AA)	Query Coverage (%)	Accession number
Mammal	Human	Homo sapiens	N/A	100	100	442	100	NP_060826.2
	Mouse	Mus musculus	90	78	86	442	100	NP_084274.1
	Whale	Balaenoptera musculus	96	89	94	467	100	XP_036705025.1
Aves	Chicken	Gallus gallus	312	68	79	446	98	XP_418996.3
Reptile	Tiger rattlesnake	Crotalus tigris	312	65	75	476	98	XP_039212189.1
Amphibian	African clawed frog	Xenopus laevis	352	67	78	459	95	XP_018121838.1
Fish	Zebrafish	Danio rerio	435	57	71	439	95	NP_956625.1
	Sea lamprey	Petromyzon marinus	615	51	69	589	89	XP_032827184.1
Invertebrate	Fruit fly	Drosophila suzukii	797	33	50	481	95	XP_036671373.1

Conceptual translation of human C5orf22 isoform X1. C5orf22 isoform 1 nucleotide sequence overlying protein translation. Features and sequences are indicated in respective colors. Figure legend is listed here: Start: First ATG encoding methionine. Disordered: Disordered region. GlobD: globular domain. Ex*|ex*: border of two exons. M-alt term: Alternate methionine N-terminus. Phos site: Phosphorylation site. Ubq site: Ubiquitination site. Sumo site: Sumoylation site. SNP: single nucleotide polymorphism. Myrstyl: myristoylation site. PDphos: Proline dependent phosphorylation site. MAPK: MAPK domain. A-hlx: alpha-helix. B-sheet:Beta-pleated sheet. NLS:Nuclear localization signal.Stop: Stop codon. miRNA site: miRNA site with target score of 98%, indicated by miRDB. PolyA signal: Polyadenylation regulatory signal.

== Clinical significance ==
Recent studies on miRNA's role in breast cancer pathogenesis has correlated upregulation of C5orf22 with reduced survival of breast cancer patients.

Patient's with tibial muscular dystrophy, exhibit decreased expression of C5orf22. Patient's with non-ischemic cardiomyopathy exhibit increased expression of C5orf22.
