= CFAP20DC =

Human gene

Identifiers
- Aliases: CFAP20DC, chromosome 3 open reading frame 67, C3orf67, CFAP20 domain containing
- External IDs: MGI: 1926154; GeneCards: CFAP20DC

Gene location (Human)
Chr.	Chromosome 3 (human)
Band	3p14.2	Start	58,717,365 bp
Band	3p14.2	End	59,050,084 bp

Gene location (Mouse)
Chr.	Chromosome 14 (mouse)
Band	14|14 A1	Start	13,803,533 bp
Band	14|14 A1	End	14,038,581 bp
RNA expression pattern
Bgee	Human / Mouse (ortholog); Top expressed in: left testis; right testis; sperm; gonad; testicle; olfactory zone of nasal mucosa; mucosa of paranasal sinus; islet of Langerhans; bronchial epithelial cell; pancreatic ductal cell / Top expressed in: interventricular septum; lumbar spinal ganglion; tail of embryo; lacrimal gland; transitional epithelium of urinary bladder; genital tubercle; otic vesicle; zygote; ventricular zone; epithelium of stomach; More reference expression data
BioGPS	n/a
Orthologs
Databases	NCBI: entry; OMA: entry
Species	Human	Mouse
Entrez	200844	74430
Ensembl	ENSG00000163689	ENSMUSG00000021747
UniProt	Q6ZVT6	Q6P2K3
RefSeq (mRNA)	NM_198463; NM_001351530; NM_001351531; NM_001351532; NM_001351533 NM_001351534; NM_001394063	NM_028934
RefSeq (protein)	NP_940865; NP_001338459; NP_001338460; NP_001338461; NP_001338462 NP_001338463	NP_083210
Location (UCSC)	Chr 3: 58.72 – 59.05 Mb	Chr 14: 13.8 – 14.04 Mb
PubMed search
- Wikidata
View/Edit Human	View/Edit Mouse

CFAP20 domain containing or C3orf67 is a protein that in humans is encoded by the gene CFAP20DC. The function of C3orf67 is not yet fully understood.

== Gene ==
C3orf67 is located at 3p14.2 on the reverse strand ranging from 58716417 to 59050045 base pairs. The accession number is NP_001338459.1.

== Protein ==
Map of C3orf67 with exon/exon boundaries, conserved domains, and highly conserved regions.

=== Primary sequence and isoforms ===
The coding sequence is 402-2681 base pairs of 3135 base pairs, making up 759 amino acids. C3orf67 has six validated isoforms. Isoform one is the most complete with 16 exons. C3orf67 weighs 84.35 kilodaltons.

=== Domains and motifs ===
There are three functional domains identified for C3orf67

- DUF667
- CM_mono2
- OCRE

=== Post-translational modifications ===
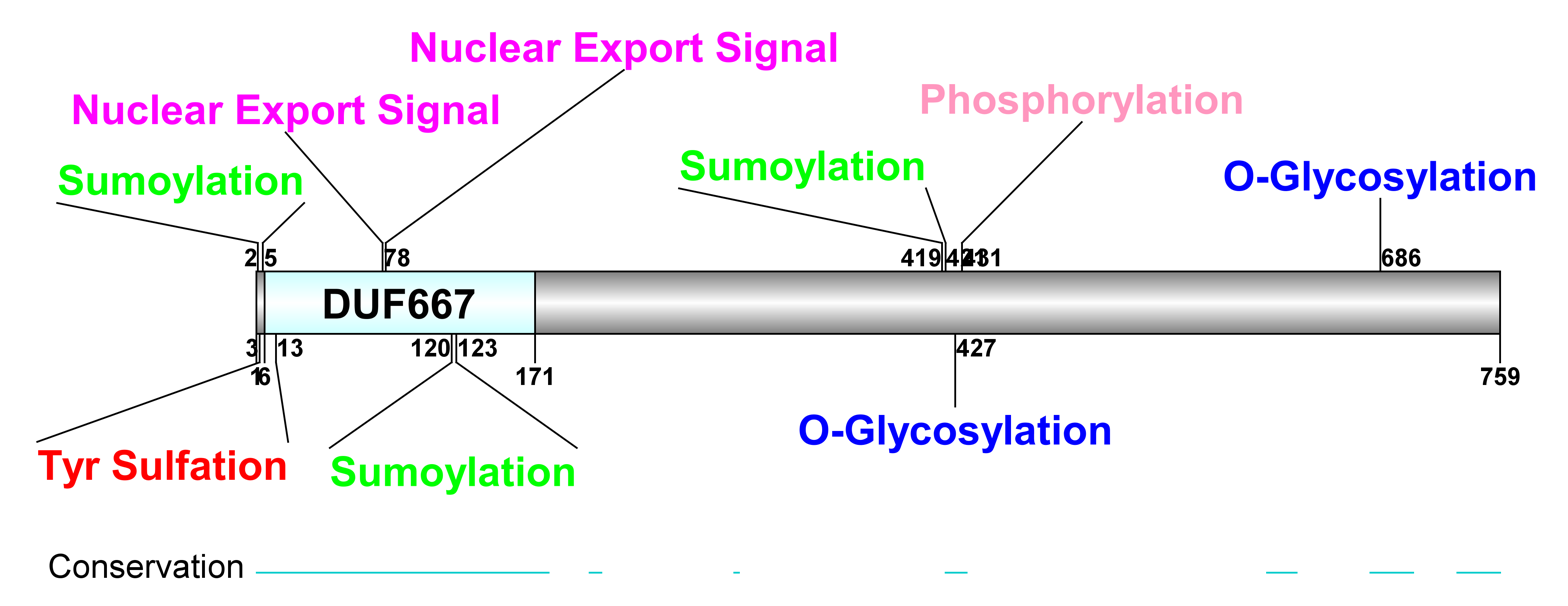
Map of conserved PTMs for C3orf67.

Several post-translational modifications have been predicted for C3orf67 in conserved regions using various bioinformatic prediction tools

- Two nuclear export signals
- Three sumoylation sites
- Two o-glycosylation sites
- One phosphorylation site
- One tyrosine sulfation site

=== Secondary structure ===
The beginning of C3orf67 is predicted to consist of a series of beta strands and a couple alpha helices that coincide with the DUF667 domain. There are also alpha helices predicted in regions that correspond to the CM_mono2 and OCRE domains.

=== Tertiary structure ===
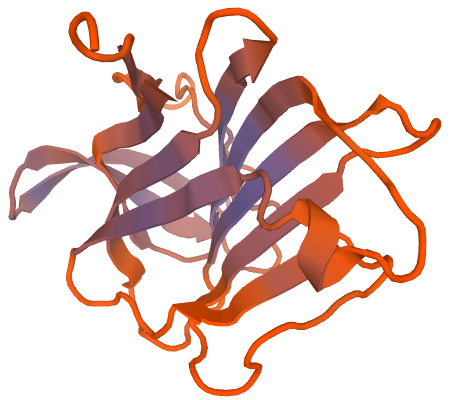
Predicted tertiary structure of DUF667 region of C3orf67.

The DUF667 region is predicted to form a tube-like structure from a series of beta sheets.

== Homology and Evolution ==
=== Paralogs ===
There are no known paralogs of C3orf67.

=== Orthologs ===
Orthologs have been identified for C3orf67 in species ranging from fungus, plants, hemichordates, parasites, fish, reptiles, birds, invertebrates, and mammals.

Variety of orthologous species of C3orf67.
Species	Common Name	Date of Divergence (MYA)	Accession Number	Sequence Length (aa)	% Identity
Orbicella faveolata	Mountainous star coral	824	XP_020630732.1 / XP_020630739.1	849	32.20%
Exaiptasia pallida	Pale anemone	824	XP_020899564.1	797	32.00%
Acanthaster planci	Crown-of-thorns starfish	684	XP_022107809.1	976	31.60%
Stylophora pistillata	Smooth cauliflower coral	824	XP_022782397.1	825	30.80%
Crassostrea gigas	Pacific oyster	797	XP_011453705.1	950	29.50%
Lingula anatina	Lamp shell	797	XP_013404893.1	1077	29.30%
Octopus bimaculoides	California two-spotted octopus	797	XP_014778712.1	902	29.10%
Saccoglossus kowalevskii	Acorn worm	684	XP_006821003.1	596	23.30%
Amphimedon queenslandica	Sponge	951.8	XP_011402616.1	508	22.70%

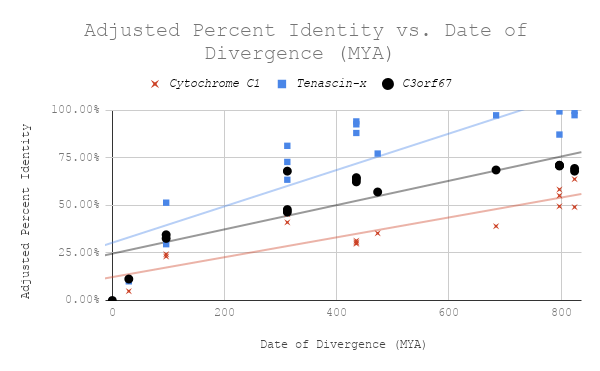
Mutation rate of C3orf67.

=== Distant homologs ===
Most distant homologs of C3orf67.
Species	Common Name	Date of Divergence (MYA)	Accession Number	Sequence Length (aa)	% Identity
Trichinella spiralis	Trichina worm	797	XP_003374081.1	393	12.60%
Spizellomyces punctatus	Unknown	1105	XP_016608387.1	183	8.20%
Selaginella moellendorffii	Spikemoss	1496	XP_002989784.1	209	6.00%

== Expression ==
=== Promoter ===
The promoter is well conserved across humans, gibbons, baboons, orangutans, cats, squirrels, alpacas, rabbits and mice. There are several high quality transcription factor binding sites. There are also several stem-loop structures that are predicted to be formed in the promoter region, some of which overlap with transcription factor binding sites.

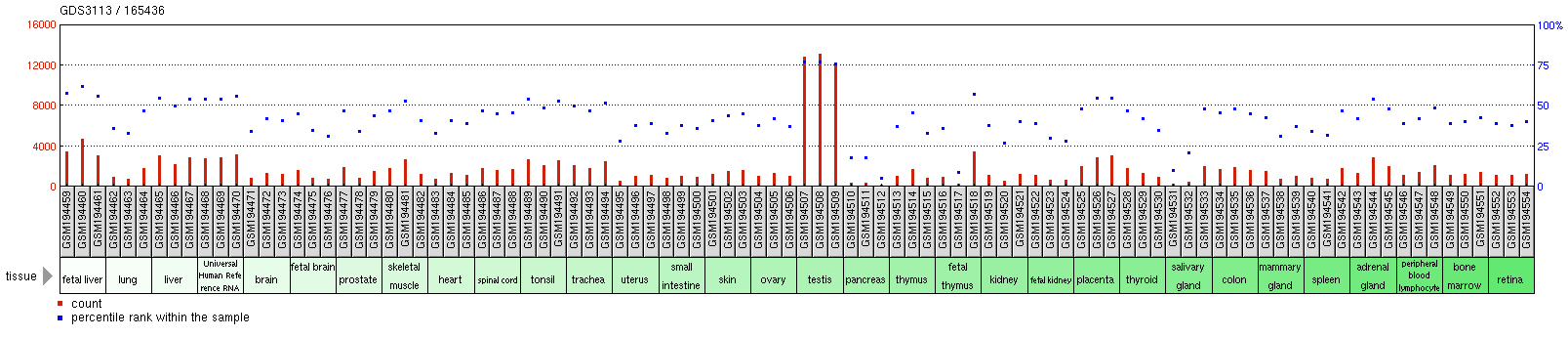
General tissue expression pattern of C3orf67.

=== Expression ===
C3orf67 is prominently expressed in the liver, tonsils, trachea, ovaries, testis, placenta, and colon. In other tissues it is expressed at low levels. An increase in expression has been linked to small cell lung cancer.

== Function ==
The protein has been identified as one of seventeen (17) genes that may play a novel role in the intersection of tumor promotion and DNA-damaging stress and may be linked to carcinogenesis.

== Interacting Proteins ==
=== Transcription factors ===
There are three notable transcription factors that are known to be involved in the regulation of cell growth or immune responses:

- V$SMAD3.01
  - Smad3 is a transcription factor involved in TGF-beta signaling.
- V$EBF1.01
  - Early B-cell factor 1 regulates B cell gene networks.
- V$IK2.01
  - Ikaros 2 is a potential regulator for lymphocyte differentiation.

=== Other interacting proteins ===
Several other proteins have been predicted to interact with C3orf67:

- CLK1
  - Phosphorylates serine/arginine-rich proteins involved in pre-mRNA processing in the nucleus.
- CDK16 (gene)
  - A protein kinase thought to play a role in signal transduction cascades in differentiated cells, exocytosis, and transport of secretory cargo from the ER.
- MARS2
  - Mitochondrial methionyl-tRNA synthetase.
- AARS2
  - mitochondrial alanyl-tRNA synthetase.
- C12orf60
