= C12orf60 =

Protein-coding gene in humans

Identifiers
- Aliases: C12orf60, chromosome 12 open reading frame 60
- External IDs: MGI: 3605234; GeneCards: C12orf60

Gene location (Human)
Chr.	Chromosome 12 (human)
Band	12p13.1-p12.3	Start	14,803,666 bp
Band	12p13.1-p12.3	End	14,906,586 bp

Gene location (Mouse)
Chr.	Chromosome 6 (mouse)
Band	6|6 G1	Start	136,804,624 bp
Band	6|6 G1	End	136,817,660 bp
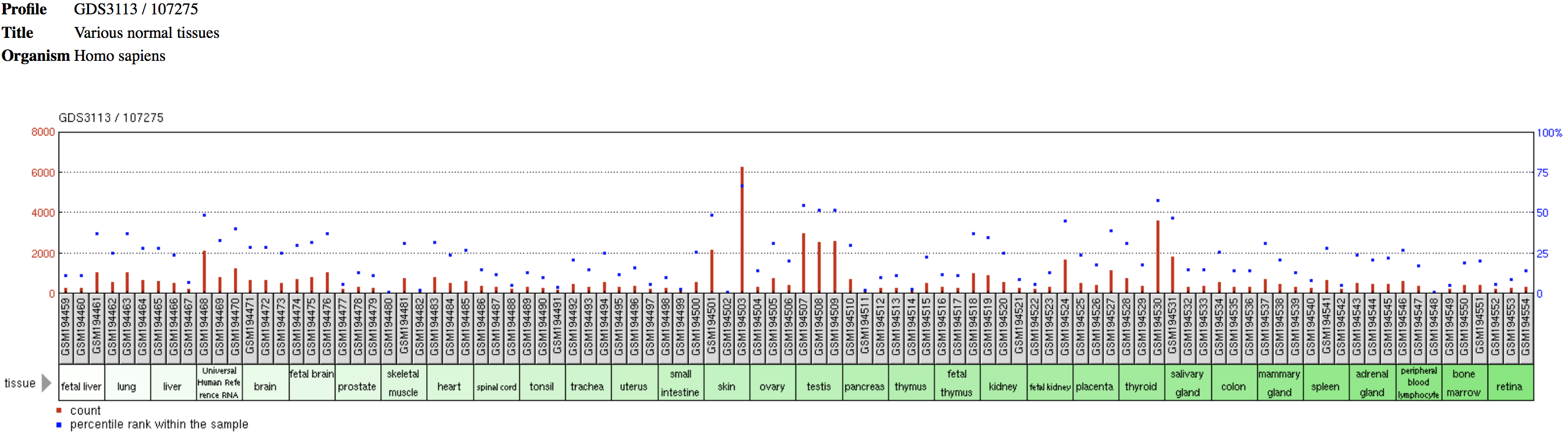
RNA expression pattern
Bgee	Human / Mouse (ortholog); Top expressed in: sperm; testicle; left testis; right testis; gonad; right lobe of liver; myocardium of left ventricle; islet of Langerhans; right adrenal cortex; right auricle of heart / Top expressed in: testicle; spermatid; embryo; tail of embryo; embryo; morula; spermatocyte; blastocyst; neural tube; right kidney; More reference expression data
BioGPS	More reference expression data
Orthologs
Databases	NCBI: entry; OMA: entry
Species	Human	Mouse
Entrez	144608	320135
Ensembl	ENSG00000182993	ENSMUSG00000047515
UniProt	Q5U649	Q810N5
RefSeq (mRNA)	NM_175874	NM_178776
RefSeq (protein)	NP_787070	NP_848891
Location (UCSC)	Chr 12: 14.8 – 14.91 Mb	Chr 6: 136.8 – 136.82 Mb
PubMed search
- Wikidata
View/Edit Human	View/Edit Mouse

Uncharacterized protein C12orf60 is a protein that in humans (Homo sapiens) is encoded by the C12orf60 gene. The gene is also known as LOC144608 or MGC47869. The protein lacks transmembrane domains and helices, but it is rich in alpha-helices. It is predicted to localize in the nucleus.

The C12orf60 mature mRNA transcript is 1139 nucleotides long and encodes a protein containing 245 amino acids. The protein lacks transmembrane domains and helices, but it is rich in alpha-helices. It is predicted to localize in the nucleus, but its function is not yet well understood by the scientific community. The gene was listed as a potential biomarker for detecting the efficacy of allergen immunotherapy.

The gene is highly expressed in the testes and colon, but it is also expressed in the kidney, breast carcinomas, brain, and various endocrine glands.

== Gene ==
=== Locus and size ===
Location of C12orf60 on Chromosome 12

C12rf60 is located on Chromosome 12 beginning at 14,803,572 bp and ending at 14,823,858 bp, spanning 20,287 base pairs It is located on the forward/positive strand between the 12p12.3 and 12p13.1 cytogenic bands. Other genes that are within 100 kilobases of this gene include:

- Positive/Forward Strand
  - H2A histone family member J (H2AFJ)
- Negative/Backwards Strand
  - Single-pass membrane protein with coiled-coil domains 3 (SMCO3)
  - WW domain binding protein 11 (WBP11)
  - ADP-ribosyltransferase 4 (ART4)
  - Histone cluster 4, H4 (HIST4H4)
  - LOC105369669
  - Matrix Gla protein (MGP)

=== Common aliases ===
C12orf60 is also known as LOC144608 and MGC47869.

== mRNA ==
A total of 22 exons exist within the gene.5 From these exons, there are 13 transcript variants. 12 of these transcript variants are predicted, and only a further 7 of these are predicted to encode a protein. Furthermore, they are predicted to encode the same protein.

Spatial distribution of the C12orf60 splice isoforms between cytogenic bands 12p12.3 and 12p13.1. All isoforms beginning with an “X” are predicted. The purple transcripts are non-coding, and the green transcripts all encode the same protein sequence. Ticks on the lines indicate the locations of exons, while introns lie in-between.

The notable features of the mRNA sequence include two polyadenylation signals in the 3' untranslated region (UTR), and it is the target of several RNA-binding proteins (RBP) including RBP-MBNL1 in the 5' UTR. A single intron splice site exists in the primary transcript, as does an upstream in-frame stop codon.

== Protein ==
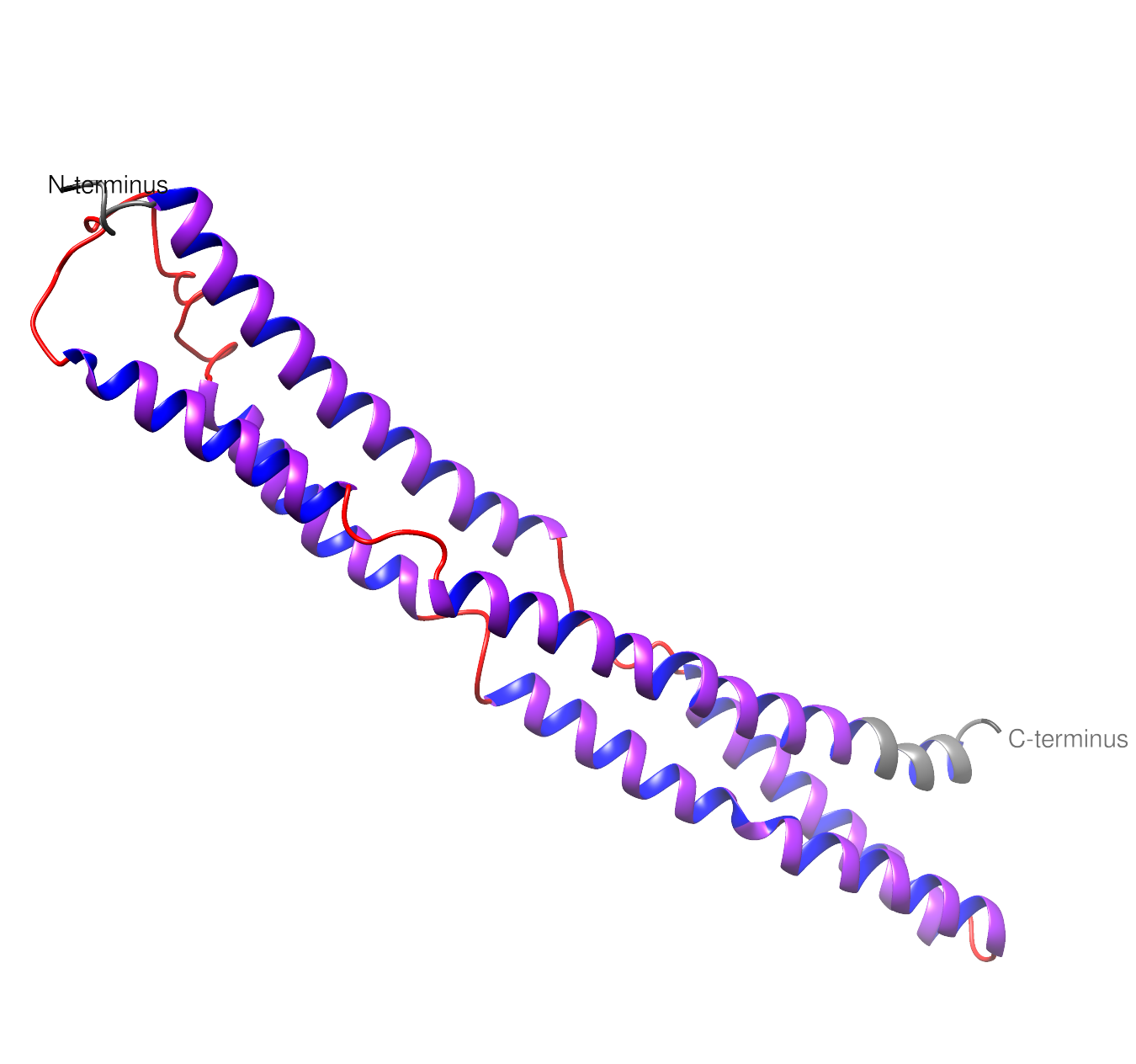
Predicted tertiary structure for C12orf60 protein by I-TASSER. The amino acid termini are labeled. Regions located within DUF4533 are colored red if it is a coiled-coil and purple/blue if it is an alpha-helix. Otherwise, coiled-coils are colored grey and alpha-helices are colored gray/blue.

=== Composition ===
C12orf60 has a predicted isoelectric point of 8.19 and a molecular weight of 27.6 kilodaltons. Glycine and tyrosine residues are relatively less prevalent compared to other proteins in the human proteome, while methionine is more prevalent.

Rotating predicted protein model for C12orf60 by I-TASSER.

=== Topology ===
The protein product is predicted to have multiple α-helices, coiled coil, and one β-sheet. It is suggested that the protein does not contain transmembrane regions or helices, meaning that the protein is not anchored to the cell membrane nor an intracellular membrane like the Golgi apparatus.

=== Conserved domains ===
In the predicted protein product, C12orf60 contains a conserved protein domain of 225 amino acids. This domain (DUF4533) is within the pfam15047 family of proteins. Only one other gene is listed within this family: C12orf69, which is also known as SMOC3 (single-pass membrane protein with coiled-coil domains 3).

Analysis of human C12orf60 and 9 of its orthologs reveals a highly conserved ERL motif starting at the 10th residue of the human protein sequence. It is not known whether this motif occurs in other proteins.

Other conserved residues are Asp25, Ser28, Phe37, Met41, Glu69, Leu85, Lys88, Leu143, Pro147, Ile148, Leu151, Gln164, Lys189, Leu191, Ala207, and Glu212, Leu225, and Lys227. Furthermore, these residues lie within DUF4533, suggesting that these conserved amino acids are important for the function of the domain. Also, the region between the 100 and 150 residues are not conserved. Thus, this region is not likely vital to the protein's function.

=== Post-translational modification ===
Since it is predicted that the protein product is intracellular, extracellular modifications are not predicted to occur on C12orf60. Other modifications such as acetylation, phosphorylation, picornaviral protease cleavage, sumoylation, and O-beta-GlcNAcylation are predicted to occur on C12orf60 as well as several of its orthologous proteins. There are two amino acids that serve as sites of both phosphorylation and O-beta-GlcNAcylation, which may indicate a site of protein activation or inactivation.

Schematic diagram of post-translational modifications that C12orf60 is predicted to undergo.

=== Subcellular localization ===
C12orf60 is predicted to be localized in the nucleus, cytoplasm, or outside the cell. However, current literature supports its localization in the nucleus.

== Expression ==
=== Tissue expression ===
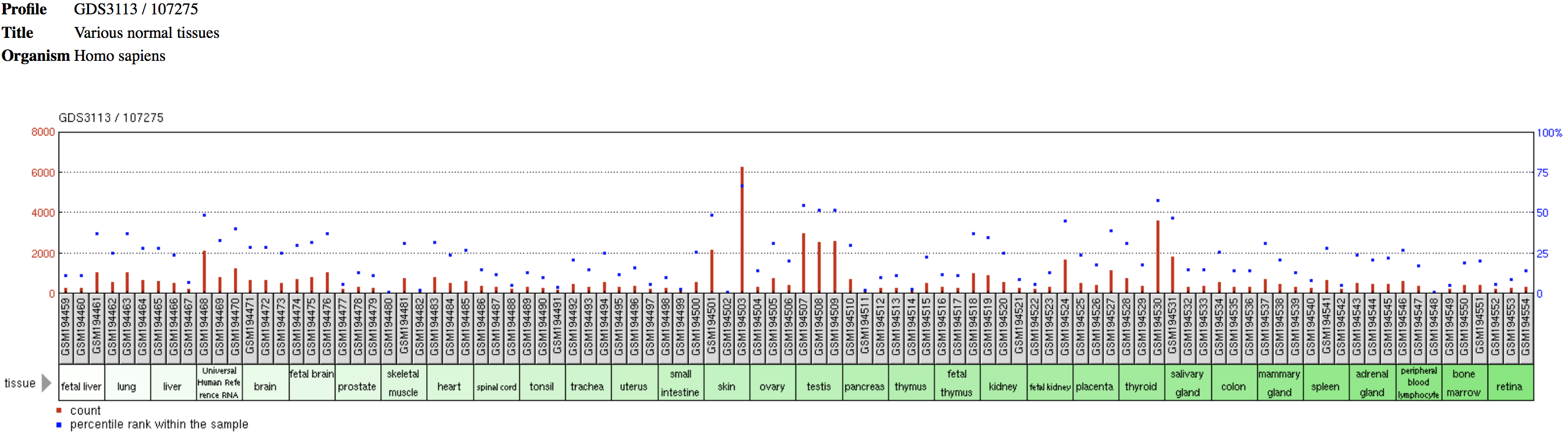
Microarray-assessed tissue expression profile of C12orf60.

Expression of C12orf60 is regulated. The gene is highly expressed in the testes and colon, but it is also expressed in the kidney, breast carcinomas, various endocrine glands, and some regions of the brain. It is also expressed in the embryo body and fetus during development.

Micrarray-assessed brain expression profile of C12orf60. Expression locations are as follows (high expression locations bolded): 1) Cerebral cortex, 2) cerebral nuclei, 3) epithalamus, 4) hypothalamus, 5) subthalamus, 6) thalamus, 7) midbrain tectum, 8) midbrain tegmentum, 9) cerebellum, 10) pons, 11) myelencephalon, 12) telencephalic white matter, 13) ventricles

=== Transcriptional regulation ===
The promoter GXP_71811 regulates the expression of C12orf60. The promoter is 1373 base pairs long and is also located on the positive strand. There are over 400 transcription factors that are possible matches for binding to this promoter, including those of the SOX/SRY-sex/testis determining, human and murine ETS, and homeodomain transcription factors.

== Protein interactions ==
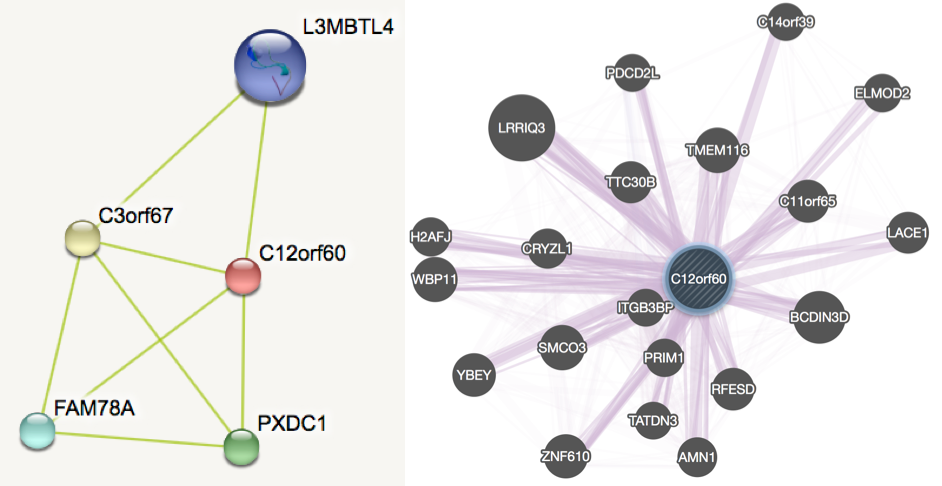
C12orf60 protein interaction (left) and co-expression (right).

Rolland et al. found that C12orf60 interacts with BMP4 (bone morphogenetic protein 4). BMP4 induces bone and cartilage formation. It also acts in mesoderm induction and fracture repair.

Several other proteins might also interact with C12orf60, and some are predicted to be co-expressed with the protein. Possible protein interactions include L3MBTL4, C3orf67, FAM78A, and PXDC1. Rats that overexpressed L3MBTL4 had higher blood pressure and heart rate.

Proteins that are thought to be co-expressed alongside C12orf60 include ELMOD2, TTC30B, and BCDIN3D. ELMOD2 is thought to be involved in antiviral responses and causing familial idiopathic pulmonary fibrosis. TTC30B is involved in the organelle biogenesis and maintenance pathway as well as intraflagellar transport. BCDIN3D is a methyltransferase and serves as a negative regulator of miRNA processing. As there is no agreement from various sources on any protein-protein interaction, it is difficult to determine if any of these interactions actually occur.

== homology ==
=== Paralogs ===
There are no known paralogs to this gene within the human genome, and no paralogs of C12orf60 were found within the selected species that have a C12orf60 protein ortholog.

=== Orthologs ===
Many orthologs are found in mammals and a couple of bird species.

Table of Select C12orf60 Orthologs in Other Species Compared to Human C12orf60
Genus and species	Common name	Estimated Time Since LCA of Protein (MY)	Accession # (mRNA)	Accession # (Protein)	Corrected Protein Sequence Identity Deviation (%)
Homo sapiens	Humans	0	NM_175874.3	NP_787070.2	0
Pongo abelii	Sumatran orangutan	15.76	XM_002822980.2	XP_002823026.1	2.94
Rhinopithecus bieti	Black snub-nosed monkey	29.44	XM_017873538.1	XP_017729027.1	9.87
Cebus capucinus imitator	White-headed capuchin	43.2	XM_017528453.1	XP_017383942.1	9.87
Saimiri boliviensis boliviensis	Bolivian squirrel monkey	43.2	XM_003934554.2	XP_003934603.1	10.3
Propithecus coquereli	Coquerel's sifaka	74	XM_012652172.1	XP_012507626.1	28.6
Ceratotherium simum simum	Southern white rhinoceros	96	XM_004435503.2	XP_004435560.1	33.1
Physeter catodon	Sperm whale	96	XM_007107758.1	XP_007107820.1	35.4
Equus caballus	Horse	96	XM_001497318.3	XP_001497368.1	38.3
Miniopterus natalensis	Natal long-fingered bat	96	XM_016197505.1	XP_016052991.1	40.8
Felis catus	Domestic cat	96	XM_003988472.3	XP_003988521.1	41.4
Ovis aries	Sheep	96	XM_004007552.3	XP_004007601.1	43.9
Ursus maritimus	Polar bear	96	XM_008707031.1	XP_008705253.1	44.0
Choloepus hoffmanni	Hoffman's two-toed sloth	105	N/A	N/A	44.5
Canis lupus familiaris	Dog	96	XM_005637113.2	XP_005637170.1	48.1
Erinaceus europaeus	Western European hedgehog	96	XM_007533153.1	XP_007533215.1	48.8
Dasypus novemcinctus	Nine-banded armadillo	105	XM_004460316.1	XP_004460373.1	56.0
Echinops telfairi	Small Madagascar hedgehog	105	XM_004713800.1	XP_004713857.1	56.0
Ochotona princeps	American pika	90	XM_004592653.2	XP_004592710.1	56.7
Myotis brandtii	Brandt's bat	96	XM_005866788.2	XP_005866850.1	59.2
Mus musculus	House mouse	90	NM_178776.3	NP_848891.2	62.0
Rattus norvegicus	Norway rat	90	NM_001037797.1	NP_001032886.1	67.3
Sorex araneus	European shrew	96	XM_004611368.1	XP_004611425.1	75.1
Leptosomus discolor	Cuckoo roller	312	XM_009947218.1	XP_009945520.1	129 (100%)
Melopsittacus undulatus	Budgerigar	312	N/A	N/A	160 (100%)

== Clinical significance ==
=== References in literature ===
The gene is within 1 Mb of SNPs that were associated with obesity, height, and weight.

The gene was listed along with two other genes in a patent as a potential biomarker for detecting the efficacy of allergen immunotherapy. Specifically, detection of 3 copies of C12orf60 meant that immunotherapy was ineffective.

In one study, the gene was among several identified genes that were translocated in a single patient with recurrent acute lymphoblastic leukemia. This translocation was associated with apoptosis and tumorigenesis.

Another study found that the gene is upregulated by at least 1.5 fold in cells that expressed Constitutive Myocyte Enhancer Factor 2 (MEF2CA). MEF2CA is expressed naturally in the brain.

One study stated the gene contains a “perfect potential antioxidant protein 1 (ATOX1) DNA interaction site in the promoter region.”
