= SMCO3 =

Protein-coding gene in the species Homo sapiens

Identifiers
- Aliases: SMCO3, C12orf69, single-pass membrane protein with coiled-coil domains 3
- External IDs: MGI: 2443451; HomoloGene: 79087; GeneCards: SMCO3; OMA:SMCO3 - orthologs

Gene location (Human)
Chr.	Chromosome 12 (human)
Band	12p12.3	Start	14,804,650 bp
Band	12p12.3	End	14,814,182 bp

Gene location (Mouse)
Chr.	Chromosome 6 (mouse)
Band	6|6 G1	Start	136,806,925 bp
Band	6|6 G1	End	136,812,450 bp
RNA expression pattern
Bgee	Human / Mouse (ortholog); Top expressed in: testicle; tibial nerve; decidua; amniotic fluid; gallbladder; right coronary artery; right lung; left coronary artery; tibial arteries; tibialis anterior muscle / Top expressed in: sciatic nerve; lens; epithelium of lens; otolith organ; utricle; dentate gyrus of hippocampal formation granule cell; anterior horn of spinal cord; substantia nigra; facial motor nucleus; lumbar subsegment of spinal cord; More reference expression data
BioGPS	n/a
Orthologs
Species	Human	Mouse
Entrez	440087	654818
Ensembl	ENSG00000179256	ENSMUSG00000043298
UniProt	A2RU48	Q8BQM7
RefSeq (mRNA)	NM_001013698	NM_001039558
RefSeq (protein)	NP_001013720	NP_001034647
Location (UCSC)	Chr 12: 14.8 – 14.81 Mb	Chr 6: 136.81 – 136.81 Mb
PubMed search
- Wikidata
View/Edit Human	View/Edit Mouse

Single-pass membrane and coiled-coil domain-containing protein 3 is a protein that is encoded in humans by the SMCO3 gene.

== Gene ==
Location of SMCO3 on Chromosome 12.

=== Aliases ===
SMCO3 has 2 aliases, C12orf69 and LOC440087.

=== Location ===
SMCO3 is located on the negative strand of chromosome 12 (12p12.3) and spans 10,460 base pairs (chr12:14,803,723-14,814,182). It has 2 exons that flank a single intron.

=== Gene Neighborhood ===
SMCO3 is flanked by WW domain binding protein 11 (WBP11) and Ecto-ADP-ribosyltransferase 4 (ART4) on the minus strand and overlaps with C12orf60 on the plus strand. There is only a single isoform of this gene.

=== Expression ===
SMCO3 is expressed in very low levels in several different human tissues including cervix, connective tissue, eye, lung and prostate. This highest expression of SMCO3 is seen in the kidney, liver and spleen. SMCO3 is also expressed at higher levels in cancers, especially chondrosarcoma and clear-cell renal cell carcinoma. SMCO3 expression is only seen in the fetus and adult and not in the embryoid bodies, blastocysts, infants and juveniles stages of development.

The expression of SMCO3 appears to depend upon the species, with the Mus musculus homolog of SMCO3 expressed at much higher levels in the eye compared to humans.

=== Promoter ===
The promoter region of SMCO3 is 1,100 base pairs long and begins 961 base pairs upstream of the 5' UTR with the end of the promoter completely overlapping the first exon.

=== Variants ===
There are 2,152 known nucleotide-level variants of which 27 are coding synonymous single nucleotide polymorphisms. The vast majority of single nucleotide polymorphisms (SNPs) occur within the intron with only a quarter occurring translated regions. No SMCO3 variants are known to be associated with any disorder.

Region	Number of SNPs	% of SNPs
3' UTR	299	13.9%
5' UTR	16	<1%
Exons	234	10.8%
Intron	1603	74.5%

== mRNA ==
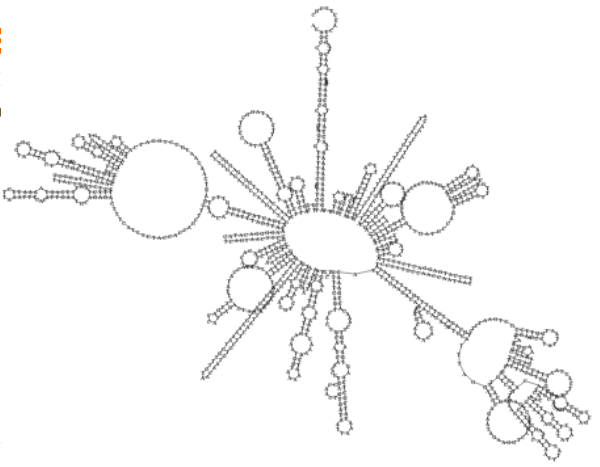
Predicted stem-loop structure of the 5' UTR of SMCO3.

=== Splice Variants ===
The mRNA transcript of SMCO3 is 2,104 base pair long. There are no mRNA variants of SMCO3.

=== Regulation ===
The SMCO3 promoter has many transcription factors binding sites including for cartilage homeoprotein 1, cAMP-responsive element binding proteins, PAR/bZIP family and vertebrate TATA binding protein factor.

== Protein ==
=== General Properties ===
SMCO3 is 225 amino acid long with a predicted molecular weight of 24.9. It is a slightly basic protein with a predicted isoelectric point of 8.3.

=== Composition ===
SMCO3 is comparably enriched in lysine and comparably poor in proline and phenylalanine compared to other human proteins. SMCO3 contains several long, uncharged segments but does not have any significantly charged segments. Despite being a transmembrane protein there are no significantly hydrophobic regions nor any significantly hydrophilic regions.

=== Domains and Motifs ===
SMCO3 has a single domain, DUF4344 (aa15:221) which is currently uncharacterised. C12orf60 also contains this domain. It contains a single transmembrane region (aa155-175) and has two coiled-coil regions (aa62-92, aa183-207). The C-terminus of SMCO3 contains a KKXX-like motif suggesting endoplasmic reticulum localisation.

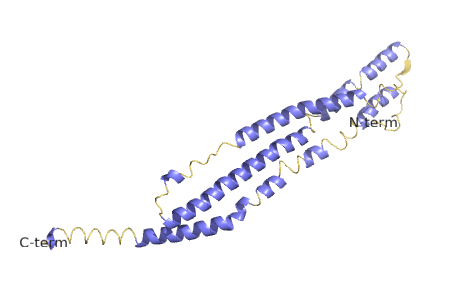
Predicted structure of SMCO3 created using iTasser and PYMOL.

=== Structure ===
The secondary structure of SMCO3 consists of several α-helices and a single β-pleated sheet interspersed with disordered coiled coil regions. in Orthologs of SMCO3 similarly show secondary structure dominated by alpha helices. There are no disulfide bridges predicted in the tertiary structure.

=== Biochemical Function ===
The function of the SMCO3 protein is currently unknown.

=== Post-Translational Modifications ===
The N-terminus of SMCO3 is cleaved, the first methionine residue removed and the N-terminus acetylated to improve stability. Additionally there are several sites that are likely phosphorylated and a single N-linked glycosylation site which is typical in ER integral membrane proteins. Unlike typical ER integral membrane proteins there is no amino-acid signal sequence.

=== Sub-Cellular Localisation ===
SMCO3 contains a transmembrane domain (aa155-175). Additionally the KKXX-like motif highly suggest that it is an endoplasmic reticulum integral membrane protein.

=== Interacting Proteins ===
Two-hybrid assays have identified that SMCO3 interacts with five proteins: FUS RNA Binding Protein (FUS), mitogen-activated protein kinase 9 (MAPK9), STN1 subunit of CST complex (OBFC1), protein phosphatase 2 catalytic subunit alpha (PPP2CA) and tripartite motif containing 39 (TRIM39). However, it is not known to take part in any pathway although the structure indicates that it takes part in protein-protein interactions. PP2CA, OBFC1, FUS1 and MAPK9 are all either implicated in cancer or have altered expression in cancer which suggests that SMCO3 may be useful as an eQTL for certain cancers.

== Clinical Significance ==
=== Mutations ===
Only 3.4% of SNPs were predicted to be deleterious, of which none had any clinical significance.

=== Disease Associations ===
GWAS showed no significant associations of SMCO3 with any disease or traits. SMCO3 is not known to be implicated in any disease. SMCO3 is expressed at higher levels in certain cancers, especially chondrosarcoma and clear-cell renal cell carcinoma.

== Evolution ==
=== Conservation ===
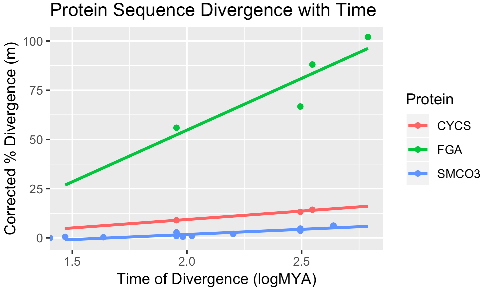
Comparison of protein amino acid sequence divergence and time of divergence as measured by million years to most recent common ancestor (MRCA). Corrected % sequence divergence (m) is measured with respect to the human sequence. CYCS [cytochome C], FGA [fibrinogen alpha chain], SMCO3 [single-pass membrane and coiled-coil domain-containing protein 3].

The amino acid sequence of SMCO3 is highly conserved compared to other human proteins. There is dramatically lower levels of sequence divergence than expected, even compared to proteins known to have low levels of sequence divergence with time.

=== Homology ===
SMCO3 in largely conserved in amniotes. Orthologs have been identified in many mammals, reptiles and birds. The closest ortholog is found in Pan troglodytes and has a 99.7% sequence similarity. More distant homologs have also been identified in a select few bony fish but orthologs are not seen in cartilaginous fish, insects or other invertebrates. No paralogs of SMCO3 in humans have been identified.

Species	Common name	Estimated Time of Divergence (MYA)	NCBI Accession Number	Sequence length (aa)	Sequence identity (%)
Homo sapiens	Humans	0	XP_016874801.1	225	100
Rhinopithecus roxellana	Golden snub nosed monkey	29.44	XP_010366768.1	225	94.7
Oryctolagus cuniculus	European rabbit	90	XP_002712692.1	225	91.1
Delphinapterus leucas	Beluga whale	96	XP_022433365.1	225	92.0
Phascolarctos cinereus	Koala	159	XP_020849872.1	225	80
Pygoscelis adeliae	Adaliae penguin	312	XP_009320673.1	225	59.6
Anolis carolinensis	Green anole	312	XP_016849216.1	227	53.8
Lepisosteus oculatus	Spotted Gar	435	XP_015199541.1	215	39.9
