= SURF4 =

Protein-coding gene humans

Identifiers
- Aliases: SURF4, ERV29, surfeit 4
- External IDs: OMIM: 185660; MGI: 98445; HomoloGene: 6052; GeneCards: SURF4; OMA:SURF4 - orthologs

Gene location (Human)
Chr.	Chromosome 9 (human)
Band	9q34.2	Start	133,361,450 bp
Band	9q34.2	End	133,376,166 bp
RNA expression pattern
Bgee	Human / Mouse (ortholog); Top expressed in: islet of Langerhans; stromal cell of endometrium; duodenum; body of pancreas; placenta; right lobe of liver; gallbladder; smooth muscle tissue; left adrenal gland; left adrenal cortex / n/a; More reference expression data
BioGPS	n/a
Gene ontology
Molecular function	protein binding
Cellular component	integral component of membrane; Golgi apparatus; endoplasmic reticulum-Golgi intermediate compartment membrane; endoplasmic reticulum; membrane; endoplasmic reticulum-Golgi intermediate compartment; transport vesicle; endoplasmic reticulum membrane; Golgi membrane; plasma membrane; azurophil granule membrane; cytosol
Biological process	early endosome to Golgi transport; positive regulation of organelle organization; protein exit from endoplasmic reticulum; Golgi organization; retrograde vesicle-mediated transport, Golgi to endoplasmic reticulum; neutrophil degranulation
Sources:Amigo / QuickGO
Orthologs
Species	Human	Mouse
Entrez	6836	20932
Ensembl	ENSG00000148248; ENSG00000280951	n/a
UniProt	O15260	Q64310
RefSeq (mRNA)	NM_001280788; NM_001280789; NM_001280790; NM_001280791; NM_001280792 NM_001280793; NM_033161	NM_011512
RefSeq (protein)	NP_001267717; NP_001267718; NP_001267719; NP_001267720; NP_001267721 NP_001267722; NP_149351	NP_035642
Location (UCSC)	Chr 9: 133.36 – 133.38 Mb	n/a
PubMed search
- Wikidata
View/Edit Human	View/Edit Mouse

Surfeit locus protein 4 or Surf4 is a protein involved in regulating export of some proteins from the endoplasmic reticulum to the golgi bodies. Surf4 is involved in trafficking soluble (i.e. non-membrane-bound) proteins, namely lipoproteins and PCSK9. It recognizes cargo proteins via a three-amino-acid sequence near the N-termini. The related protein in yeast is called Erv29p.

This gene is named based on its location in the surfeit gene cluster, composed of six housekeeping genes that do not share sequence similarity. The encoded protein is a conserved integral membrane protein containing multiple putative transmembrane regions. Surf4's yeast homolog is directly required for packaging glycosylated pro-alpha-factor into COPII vesicles.

Eliminating Surf4 in the liver reduces the amount of lipid in the plasma and prevents atherosclerosis in mice.
