= 60S ribosomal protein L7a =

Protein found in humans

RPL7A

Identifiers
- Aliases: RPL7A, L7A, SURF3, TRUP, ribosomal protein L7a
- External IDs: OMIM: 185640; MGI: 1353472; GeneCards: RPL7A
Available structures
| PDB | Ortholog search: PDBe RCSB |
| PDB | List of PDB id codes 4UG0, 4V6X, 5AJ0, 4UJD, 4D67, 4D5Y, 4UJE, 4UJC |

Gene location (Human)
| Chr. | Chromosome 9 (human) |
| Band | 9q34.2 | Start | 133,348,218 bp |
| Band | 9q34.2 | End | 133,351,426 bp |

Gene location (Mouse)
| Chr. | Chromosome 2 (mouse) |
| Band | 2 A3|2 19.1 cM | Start | 26,800,776 bp |
| Band | 2 A3|2 19.1 cM | End | 26,803,330 bp |
RNA expression pattern
| Bgee | Human / Mouse (ortholog); Top expressed in: gonad; left ovary; islet of Langerhans; right uterine tube; left adrenal cortex; right ovary; right adrenal gland; right adrenal cortex; smooth muscle tissue; pituitary gland / Top expressed in: epiblast; ganglionic eminence; ventricular zone; uterus; embryo; embryo; ovary; esophagus; lip; lens; More reference expression data |
| BioGPS | n/a |
Gene ontology
| Molecular function | structural constituent of ribosome; protein binding; cadherin binding; RNA binding |
| Cellular component | cytoplasm; cytosol; ribosome; membrane; focal adhesion; nucleolus; cytosolic large ribosomal subunit; extracellular exosome; nucleus; polysomal ribosome; ribonucleoprotein complex |
| Biological process | ribosome biogenesis; viral transcription; SRP-dependent cotranslational protein targeting to membrane; translational initiation; nuclear-transcribed mRNA catabolic process, nonsense-mediated decay; rRNA processing; maturation of LSU-rRNA; protein biosynthesis |
Sources:Amigo / QuickGO
Orthologs
| Databases | NCBI: entry; OMA: entry |
| Species | Human | Mouse |
| Entrez | 6130 | 27176 |
| Ensembl | ENSG00000280858; ENSG00000148303 | ENSMUSG00000062647 |
| UniProt | P62424 | P12970 |
| RefSeq (mRNA) | NM_000972 | NM_013721 |
| RefSeq (protein) | NP_000963 | NP_038749 |
| Location (UCSC) | Chr 9: 133.35 – 133.35 Mb | Chr 2: 26.8 – 26.8 Mb |
| PubMed search |
- Wikidata
| View/Edit Human | View/Edit Mouse |

60S ribosomal protein L7a is a protein that in humans is encoded by the RPL7A gene.

Cytoplasmic ribosomes, organelles that catalyze protein synthesis, consist of a small 40S subunit and a large 60S subunit. Together these subunits are composed of 4 RNA species and approximately 80 structurally distinct proteins. This gene encodes a ribosomal protein that is a component of the 60S subunit. The protein belongs to the L7AE family of ribosomal proteins. It can interact with a subclass of nuclear hormone receptors, including thyroid hormone receptor, and inhibit their ability to transactivate by preventing their binding to their DNA response elements. This gene is included in the surfeit gene cluster, a group of very tightly linked genes that do not share sequence similarity. It is co-transcribed with the U24, U36a, U36b, and U36c small nucleolar RNA genes, which are located in its second, fifth, fourth, and sixth introns, respectively. This gene rearranges with the trk proto-oncogene to form the chimeric oncogene trk-2h, which encodes an oncoprotein consisting of the N terminus of ribosomal protein L7a fused to the receptor tyrosine kinase domain of trk. As is typical for genes encoding ribosomal proteins, there are multiple processed pseudogenes of this gene dispersed through the genome.
