= Surfeit =

Gene cluster in Homo sapiens

Surfeit is a human gene cluster that consists of a group of very tightly linked genes on chromosome 9 that do not share sequence similarity. Genes in this cluster are numbered 1 through 6: SURF1, SURF2, SURF3, SURF4, SURF5, and SURF6.
