= SURF6 =

Gene in humans

Identifiers
- Aliases: SURF6, RRP14, surfeit 6
- External IDs: OMIM: 185642; MGI: 98447; HomoloGene: 133981; GeneCards: SURF6; OMA:SURF6 - orthologs

Gene location (Human)
Chr.	Chromosome 9 (human)
Band	9q34.2	Start	133,328,776 bp
Band	9q34.2	End	133,336,188 bp

Gene location (Mouse)
Chr.	Chromosome 2 (mouse)
Band	2 A3|2 19.08 cM	Start	26,778,640 bp
Band	2 A3|2 19.08 cM	End	26,792,891 bp
RNA expression pattern
Bgee	Human / Mouse (ortholog); Top expressed in: sural nerve; mucosa of transverse colon; gastrocnemius muscle; substantia nigra; C1 segment; granulocyte; temporal lobe; small intestine; amygdala; hypothalamus / Top expressed in: epiblast; external carotid artery; internal carotid artery; primitive streak; ascending aorta; supraoptic nucleus; aortic valve; lacrimal gland; hair follicle; prostate; More reference expression data
BioGPS	n/a
Gene ontology
Molecular function	DNA binding; protein binding; RNA binding
Cellular component	nucleolus; nucleus; nucleoplasm; granular component; cytosolic large ribosomal subunit
Biological process	ribosome biogenesis; ribosomal large subunit biogenesis; ribosomal small subunit biogenesis
Sources:Amigo / QuickGO
Orthologs
Species	Human	Mouse
Entrez	6838	20935
Ensembl	ENSG00000148296; ENSG00000281309	ENSMUSG00000036160
UniProt	O75683	P70279
RefSeq (mRNA)	NM_001278942; NM_006753	NM_009298
RefSeq (protein)	NP_001265871; NP_006744	NP_033324
Location (UCSC)	Chr 9: 133.33 – 133.34 Mb	Chr 2: 26.78 – 26.79 Mb
PubMed search
- Wikidata
View/Edit Human	View/Edit Mouse

Surfeit locus protein 6 is a protein that in humans is encoded by the SURF6 gene.

This gene is located in the surfeit gene cluster, a group of very tightly linked genes that do not share sequence similarity. The gene demonstrates features of a housekeeping gene, being ubiquitously expressed, and the encoded protein has been localized to the nucleolus. The protein includes motifs found in both the mouse and fish orthologs, which suggests a putative function as a nucleolar-matrix protein with nucleic acid-binding properties, based on characteristics determined in mouse.
