= HIST4H4 =

H4-16

Identifiers
- Aliases: H4-16, H4/p, histone cluster 4, H4, histone cluster 4 H4, HIST4H4, H4 histone 16, H4C5, H4C4, H4C9, H4C12, H4C3, H4C13, H4C11, H4C1, H4C14, H4C15, H4C8, H4C6, H4C2, H4C16
- External IDs: OMIM: 615069; MGI: 2448432; GeneCards: H4-16
Available structures
PDB	Ortholog search: PDBe RCSB
PDB	List of PDB id codes 4H9O, 3WKJ, 3AYW, 3WA9, 5B0Z, 5AVB, 2CV5, 5AV5, 3AV2, 3WTP, 3AV1, 3AZK, 3X1V, 5AV8, 1F66, 4QUU, 3CFS, 4YYK, 4QUT, 3NQJ, 3A6N, 3W99, 5AVC, 2RS9, 3F9Z, 3QZT, 3QBY, 3W97, 4M38, 4YM6, 3CFV, 4HGA, 1EQZ, 2RJE, 3QZV, 1HQ3, 4H9P, 3AZL, 3AFA, 1TZY, 3UVY, 5CPK, 3JPX, 4U9W, 4N3W, 4YYJ, 4YYD, 4H9N, 4H9R, 3AZI, 4LD9, 3UVX, 3AZH, 5BNX, 4N4F, 1U35, 4YYG, 3O36, 2ARO, 5AV9, 4H9S, 3AZF, 3W98, 4GQB, 4H9Q, 5BNV, 3WAA, 3AZG, 3AZE, 2RNY, 1ZKK, 2QQS, 2LVM, 3X1T, 3AN2, 2KWO, 3QZS, 3F9W, 5FFW, 5CPJ, 3F9X, 3IJ1, 4YM5, 3AZJ, 4YY6, 3AZN, 2IG0, 4YYH, 4YYI, 5CPI, 3W96, 3R45, 2KWN, 3F9Y, 5AV6, 3AZM, 5BO0, 3X1S, 4QYD, 4KGC, 3UVW, 4YYN, 3X1U, 3UW9, 2F8N, 3NQU, 5B0Y, 4YYM, 5C3I, 4Z5T, 5B24, 5FA5, 4Z2M, 5E5A, 5FWE, 5B2I, 5B40, 5B2J, 5JA4, 5AY8, 4ZUX

Gene location (Human)
Chr.	Chromosome 12 (human)
Band	12p12.3	Start	14,767,999 bp
Band	12p12.3	End	14,771,131 bp

Gene location (Mouse)
Chr.	Chromosome 13 (mouse)
Band	13|13 A3.1	Start	22,224,806 bp
Band	13|13 A3.1	End	22,225,532 bp
RNA expression pattern
Bgee	Human / Mouse (ortholog); Top expressed in: bone marrow cell; Achilles tendon; epithelium of colon; tonsil; right uterine tube; prostate; testicle; sural nerve; body of pancreas; stomach / Top expressed in: muscle of thigh; granulocyte; blood; triceps brachii muscle; ventricular zone; sternocleidomastoid muscle; temporal muscle; quadriceps femoris muscle; soleus muscle; embryo; More reference expression data
BioGPS	n/a
Gene ontology
Molecular function	protein domain specific binding; protein binding; protein heterodimerization activity; DNA binding; histone binding; RNA binding
Cellular component	membrane; chromosome; nucleoplasm; extracellular region; nuclear chromosome; nucleosome; extracellular exosome; nucleus; extracellular matrix; protein-containing complex
Biological process	telomere organization; epigenetic maintenance of chromatin in transcription-competent conformation; protein heterotetramerization; negative regulation of megakaryocyte differentiation; CENP-A containing chromatin assembly; DNA replication-dependent chromatin assembly; rDNA heterochromatin assembly; negative regulation of gene expression, epigenetic; DNA-templated transcription, initiation; double-strand break repair via nonhomologous end joining; beta-catenin-TCF complex assembly; telomere capping; nucleosome assembly; regulation of gene silencing by miRNA; regulation of megakaryocyte differentiation; regulation of hematopoietic stem cell differentiation
Sources:Amigo / QuickGO
Orthologs
Databases	NCBI: entry; OMA: entry
Species	Human	Mouse
Entrez	121504	319158
Ensembl	ENSG00000197837	ENSMUSG00000060639
UniProt	P62805	P62806
RefSeq (mRNA)	NM_175054	NM_175656
RefSeq (protein)	NP_003537; NP_003486; NP_003535; NP_003539; NP_003531 NP_003536	NP_291074; NP_783587; NP_783588; NP_835499; NP_835500 NP_001182350; NP_835515; NP_783585; NP_783586; NP_835582; NP_835583; NP_783583; NP_694813
Location (UCSC)	Chr 12: 14.77 – 14.77 Mb	Chr 13: 22.22 – 22.23 Mb
PubMed search
- Wikidata
View/Edit Human	View/Edit Mouse

Histone H4 is a protein that in humans is encoded by the HIST4H4 gene.

Histones are basic nuclear proteins that are responsible for the nucleosome structure of the chromosomal fiber in eukaryotes. Nucleosomes consist of approximately 146 bp of DNA wrapped around a histone octamer composed of pairs of each of the four core histones (H2A, H2B, H3, and H4). The chromatin fiber is further compacted through the interaction of a linker histone, H1, with the DNA between the nucleosomes to form higher order chromatin structures. This gene is intronless and encodes a member of the histone H4 family. Transcripts from this gene lack polyA tails; instead, they contain a palindromic termination element.
