= H2AFJ =

Protein-coding gene in humans

H2AJ

Identifiers
- Aliases: H2AJ, H2AFJ, H2A.J histone, H2A histone family member J
- External IDs: MGI: 3606192; GeneCards: H2AJ
Available structures
PDB	Ortholog search: PDBe RCSB
PDB	List of PDB id codes 4EDU

Gene location (Human)
Chr.	Chromosome 12 (human)
Band	12p12.3	Start	14,774,405 bp
Band	12p12.3	End	14,778,002 bp

Gene location (Mouse)
Chr.	Chromosome 6 (mouse)
Band	6|6 G1	Start	136,785,242 bp
Band	6|6 G1	End	136,787,072 bp
RNA expression pattern
Bgee	Human / Mouse (ortholog); Top expressed in: left testis; right testis; olfactory zone of nasal mucosa; mucosa of transverse colon; tibial arteries; left coronary artery; thoracic aorta; right coronary artery; ascending aorta; Descending thoracic aorta / Top expressed in: Paneth cell; internal carotid artery; external carotid artery; lacrimal gland; crypt of lieberkuhn of small intestine; fossa; condyle; blood; hair follicle; submandibular gland; More reference expression data
BioGPS	n/a
Gene ontology
Molecular function	protein heterodimerization activity; DNA binding; molecular function
Cellular component	extracellular exosome; chromosome; nucleosome; nucleus
Biological process	chromatin organization; biological process
Sources:Amigo / QuickGO
Orthologs
Databases	NCBI: entry; OMA: entry
Species	Human	Mouse
Entrez	55766	232440
Ensembl	ENSG00000246705	ENSMUSG00000060032
UniProt	Q9BTM1	Q8R1M2
RefSeq (mRNA)	NM_018267; NM_177925	NM_177688
RefSeq (protein)	NP_808760	NP_808356
Location (UCSC)	Chr 12: 14.77 – 14.78 Mb	Chr 6: 136.79 – 136.79 Mb
PubMed search
- Wikidata
View/Edit Human	View/Edit Mouse

Histone H2A.J is a protein that in humans is encoded by the H2AFJ gene.

Histones are basic nuclear proteins that are responsible for the nucleosome structure of the chromosomal fiber in eukaryotes. Nucleosomes consist of approximately 146 bp of DNA wrapped around a histone octamer composed of pairs of each of the four core histones (H2A, H2B, H3, and H4). The chromatin fiber is further compacted through the interaction of a linker histone, H1, with the DNA between the nucleosomes to form higher order chromatin structures. This gene is located on chromosome 12 and encodes a variant H2A histone. The protein is divergent at the C-terminus compared to the consensus H2A histone family member.
