= SURF2 =

Protein found in humans

Identifiers
- Aliases: SURF2, SURF-2, surfeit 2
- External IDs: OMIM: 185630; MGI: 98444; GeneCards: SURF2

Gene location (Human)
Chr.	Chromosome 9 (human)
Band	9q34.2	Start	133,356,550 bp
Band	9q34.2	End	133,361,158 bp

Gene location (Mouse)
Chr.	Chromosome 2 (mouse)
Band	2 A3|2 19.1 cM	Start	26,806,379 bp
Band	2 A3|2 19.1 cM	End	26,810,195 bp
RNA expression pattern
Bgee	Human / Mouse (ortholog); Top expressed in: left testis; right testis; gonad; olfactory zone of nasal mucosa; temporal lobe; amygdala; prefrontal cortex; anterior cingulate cortex; dorsolateral prefrontal cortex; substantia nigra / Top expressed in: Ileal epithelium; morula; morula; otic placode; embryo; tail of embryo; otic vesicle; embryo; saccule; epiblast; More reference expression data
BioGPS	n/a
Gene ontology
Molecular function	molecular function
Cellular component	plasma membrane; nucleolus; nucleus; nuclear speck; cellular component
Biological process	biological process
Sources:Amigo / QuickGO
Orthologs
Databases	NCBI: entry; OMA: entry
Species	Human	Mouse
Entrez	6835	20931
Ensembl	ENSG00000281024; ENSG00000148291	ENSMUSG00000014873
UniProt	Q15527	P09926
RefSeq (mRNA)	NM_017503; NM_001278928	NM_013678
RefSeq (protein)	NP_001265857; NP_059973	NP_038706
Location (UCSC)	Chr 9: 133.36 – 133.36 Mb	Chr 2: 26.81 – 26.81 Mb
PubMed search
- Wikidata
View/Edit Human	View/Edit Mouse

SURF2 is a protein which in humans is encoded by the SURF2 gene. SURF2 is a member of the surfeit gene family. The SURF2 molecule interacts with beta-1, 4-Gal-T3, uPAR, and WDR20. As part of the surfeit gene cluster, SURF2 is one of several tightly linked genes that do not share sequence similarity. SURF2 maps to human chromosome 9q34.2 and shares a bidirectional promoter with SURF1 on the opposite strand. A bidirectional promoter activity is expected in the intergenic region between SURF1 and SURF2, as seen in mice.
