= Cyclin-dependent kinase 16 =

Enzyme found in humans

CDK16

Identifiers
- Aliases: CDK16, PCTAIRE, PCTAIRE1, PCTGAIRE, PCTK1, cyclin-dependent kinase 16, cyclin dependent kinase 16
- External IDs: OMIM: 311550; MGI: 97516; GeneCards: CDK16
Available structures
PDB	Ortholog search: PDBe RCSB
PDB	List of PDB id codes 3MTL
Enzyme activity
EC #	BRENDA	ExPASy	KEGG	MetaCyc
2.7.11.22	↗	↗	↗	↗

Gene location (Human)
Chr.	X chromosome (human)
Band	Xp11.3	Start	47,217,860 bp
Band	Xp11.3	End	47,229,997 bp

Gene location (Mouse)
Chr.	X chromosome (mouse)
Band	X A1.3|X 16.18 cM	Start	20,554,193 bp
Band	X A1.3|X 16.18 cM	End	20,566,119 bp
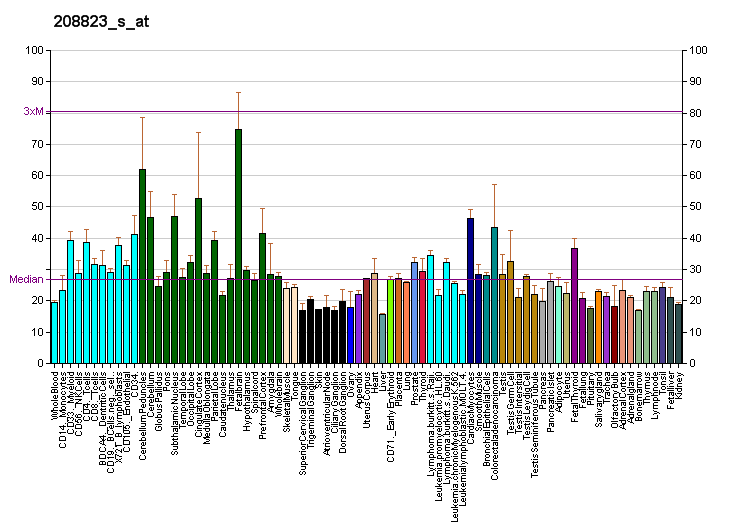

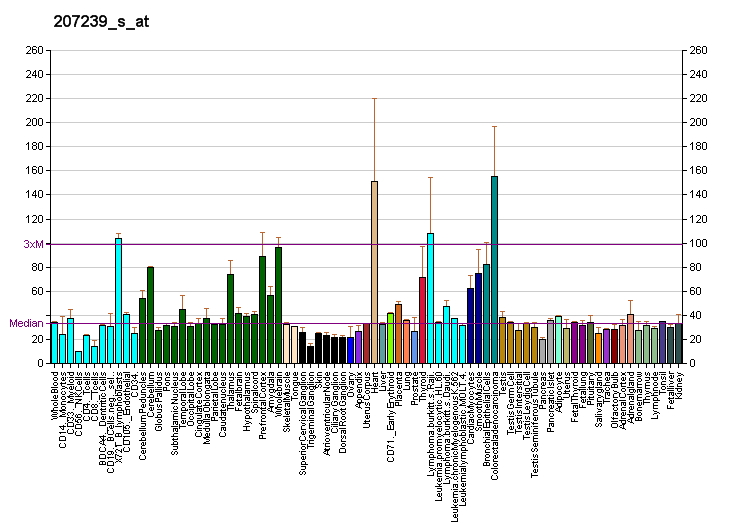

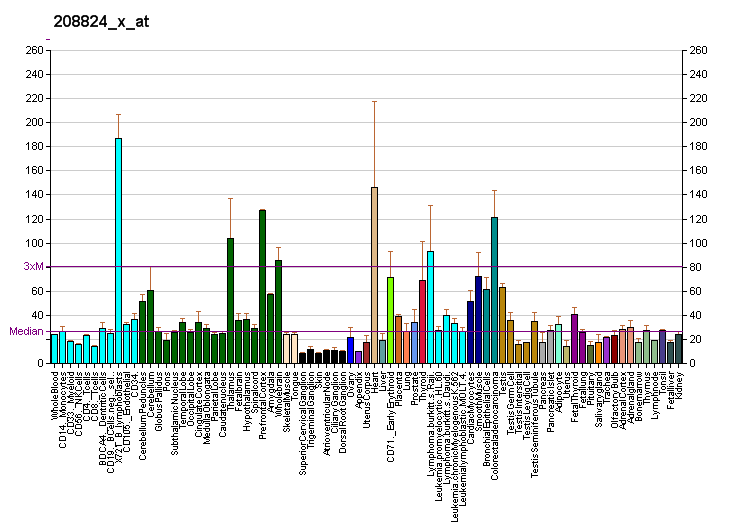
RNA expression pattern
Bgee	Human / Mouse (ortholog); Top expressed in: right hemisphere of cerebellum; muscle of thigh; apex of heart; gastrocnemius muscle; right frontal lobe; ganglionic eminence; stromal cell of endometrium; right auricle of heart; prefrontal cortex; ventricular zone / Top expressed in: fossa; condyle; Paneth cell; motor neuron; ascending aorta; aortic valve; substantia nigra; lobe of cerebellum; cerebellar vermis; internal carotid artery; More reference expression data
BioGPS	More reference expression data
Gene ontology
Molecular function	nucleotide binding; protein binding; protein kinase activity; kinase activity; ATP binding; transferase activity; protein serine/threonine kinase activity; cyclin-dependent protein serine/threonine kinase activity
Cellular component	microtubule cytoskeleton; synapse; cell junction; membrane; transport vesicle; cytoplasmic vesicle; neuron projection; extrinsic component of cytoplasmic side of plasma membrane; cytoplasm; plasma membrane; nucleus; cytosol; synaptic vesicle
Biological process	phosphorylation; cell differentiation; regulation of insulin secretion involved in cellular response to glucose stimulus; protein phosphorylation; growth hormone secretion; spermatogenesis; exocytosis; neuron projection development; regulation of cell cycle
Sources:Amigo / QuickGO
Orthologs
Databases	NCBI: entry; OMA: entry
Species	Human	Mouse
Entrez	5127	18555
Ensembl	ENSG00000102225	ENSMUSG00000031065
UniProt	Q00536	Q04735
RefSeq (mRNA)	NM_001170460; NM_006201; NM_033018; NM_033019	NM_011049; NM_001310456
RefSeq (protein)	NP_001163931; NP_006192; NP_148978	NP_001297385; NP_035179
Location (UCSC)	Chr X: 47.22 – 47.23 Mb	Chr X: 20.55 – 20.57 Mb
PubMed search
- Wikidata
View/Edit Human	View/Edit Mouse

Cyclin-dependent kinase 16 is an enzyme that in humans is encoded by the CDK16 gene (previously PCTK1).

== Function ==
The protein encoded by this gene belongs to the cdc2/cdkx subfamily of the ser/thr family of protein kinases. It may play a role in signal transduction cascades in terminally differentiated cells. This gene is thought to escape X inactivation. Two transcript variants encoding the same protein have been found for this gene.

== Interactions ==
PCTK1 has been shown to interact with CDK5R1.
