= WBP11 =

Protein-coding gene in humans

Identifiers
- Aliases: WBP11, NPWBP, PPP1R165, SIPP1, WBP-11, WW domain binding protein 11, CFAP90, BUG13, FAP90, VCTERL, VCTRL
- External IDs: OMIM: 618083; MGI: 1891823; GeneCards: WBP11
Available structures
| PDB | Ortholog search: PDBe RCSB |
| PDB | List of PDB id codes 1JMQ, 1K5R |

Gene location (Human)
| Chr. | Chromosome 12 (human) |
| Band | 12p12.3 | Start | 14,784,582 bp |
| Band | 12p12.3 | End | 14,803,486 bp |

Gene location (Mouse)
| Chr. | Chromosome 6 (mouse) |
| Band | 6 G1|6 66.72 cM | Start | 136,790,652 bp |
| Band | 6 G1|6 66.72 cM | End | 136,805,231 bp |
RNA expression pattern
| Bgee | Human / Mouse (ortholog); Top expressed in: sural nerve; germinal epithelium; palpebral conjunctiva; ventricular zone; human penis; amniotic fluid; beta cell; ganglionic eminence; Achilles tendon; visceral pleura / Top expressed in: tail of embryo; genital tubercle; spermatocyte; spermatid; seminiferous tubule; Gonadal ridge; epiblast; zygote; CA3 field; abdominal wall; More reference expression data |
| BioGPS | n/a |
Gene ontology
| Molecular function | single-stranded DNA binding; protein binding; WW domain binding; RNA binding; protein phosphatase regulator activity |
| Cellular component | nuclear speck; spliceosomal complex; intracellular membrane-bounded organelle; nucleus; nucleoplasm; cytoplasm; cytosol |
| Biological process | rRNA processing; mRNA cis splicing, via spliceosome; mRNA processing; RNA processing; regulation of catalytic activity; regulation of autophagy of mitochondrion; RNA splicing; positive regulation of protein targeting to mitochondrion; mRNA splicing, via spliceosome |
Sources:Amigo / QuickGO
Orthologs
| Databases | NCBI: entry; OMA: entry |
| Species | Human | Mouse |
| Entrez | 51729 | 60321 |
| Ensembl | ENSG00000084463 | ENSMUSG00000030216 |
| UniProt | Q9Y2W2 | Q923D5 |
| RefSeq (mRNA) | NM_016312 | NM_021714 |
| RefSeq (protein) | NP_057396 | NP_068360 |
| Location (UCSC) | Chr 12: 14.78 – 14.8 Mb | Chr 6: 136.79 – 136.81 Mb |
| PubMed search |
- Wikidata
| View/Edit Human | View/Edit Mouse |

Wbp11

Identifiers
- Symbol: Wbp11
- Pfam: PF09429
- InterPro: IPR019007
Available protein structures:
- PDB: IPR019007 PF09429 (ECOD; PDBsum)
- AlphaFold: IPR019007; PF09429

WW domain-binding protein 11 (WBP11) is a protein that in humans is encoded by the gene WBP11. Also known as NpwBP, SIPP1, and SNP70, the human protein has been implicated in transcriptional and post-transcriptional processes associated with cell division. It is a component of the spliceosome and participates in pre-mRNA splicing; fragments of WBP11 have been shown to inhibit pre-mRNA splicing catalysis. In interphase cells, WBP11 is located in the nucleus but excluded from the nucleolus, whereas during cell division it becomes distributed throughout the cytoplasm.

WBP11 contains proline-rich regions that mediate interactions with several proteins. These regions bind the WW domain of the nuclear protein Npw38, and WBP11 also interacts with SH3 domain-containing proteins. WBP11 also interacts with and inhibits protein phosphatase 1 (PP1), an effect that increases following phosphorylation by protein kinase CK1.

== Alternative names ==
- WW domain binding protein 11 (WBP11)
- Npw38-binding protein (NpwBP)
- Splicing factor that Interacts with PQBP-1 and PP1 (SIPP1)
- SH3 domain binding Protein, 70 kDa (SNP70)

== Function ==
Studies suggest that Wbp11 plays a role in DNA/ RNA transcriptional or post-transcriptional events related to cell division. Wbp11 is found in the nucleus but not the nucleoli of cells in interphase. However it is distributed throughout the cytoplasm in dividing cells. Immunoelectron-microscopy experiments suggest that relocation from a peri-nuclear to a cytoplasmic distribution, coinciding with the onset of mitosis in cell division. Other studies have shown that Wbp11 is a component of the spliceosome. Also, that Wbp11 fragments block pre-mRNA splicing catalysis.

== Protein interactions ==
Wbp11 is a polypeptide known to interact with other WW domain of proteins such as the nuclear protein Npw38 via two proline-rich regions. It associates with Npw38 (hence the name NpwBP) in the nuclei and with Poly(rG) and G-rich ssDNA. The 70kDa protein has also been found to interact with SH3 (Src homology domain 3) domains. The C-terminal proline-rich sequences of SNP70/NpwBP/Wbp11, which binds to the WW domain of Npw38 also fits with both classic type I and type II SH3 binding sequences, hence the name (SNP70).

Wbp11 was found to bind strongly to the tandem SH3 domains of p47phox and to the N-terminal SH3 domain of p47phox, and more weakly to the SH3 domains from c-src and p85α. p47phox.

Furthermore, it has been shown to interact with PP1(protein phosphatase 1), hence the name SIPP1. It has an inhibitory effect to PP1, with its inhibitory potency increasing upon phosphorylation with protein kinase CK1. The binding of Wbp11 with PP1 involves a RVXF (Arg-Val-Xaa-Phe) motif, which functions as a PP1- binding sequence in most interactors of PP1.

A number of other interactions have been indicated such as:

- Vimentin
- Growth factor receptor-bound protein 2 (GRB2)
- Genome polyprotein
- Tyrosine-protein kinase Fyn
- Pre-mRNA-processing factor 39 (PRP39)
- TNF receptor-associated factor 4 (TRAF4)
- Calcineurin B homologous protein 3 (TESC)
- Probable ATP-dependent RNA helicase DDX17
- CD2 antigen cytoplasmic tail-binding protein 2 (CD2BP2)
- Poly(rC)-binding protein 1 (PCBP1)
