= SSBP2 =

Protein-coding gene in the species Homo sapiens

Identifiers
- Aliases: SSBP2, HSPC116, SOSS-B2, single stranded DNA binding protein 2
- External IDs: OMIM: 607389; MGI: 1914220; GeneCards: SSBP2

Gene location (Human)
Chr.	Chromosome 5 (human)
Band	5q14.1	Start	81,412,804 bp
Band	5q14.1	End	81,751,797 bp

Gene location (Mouse)
Chr.	Chromosome 13 (mouse)
Band	13|13 C3	Start	91,460,283 bp
Band	13|13 C3	End	91,703,429 bp
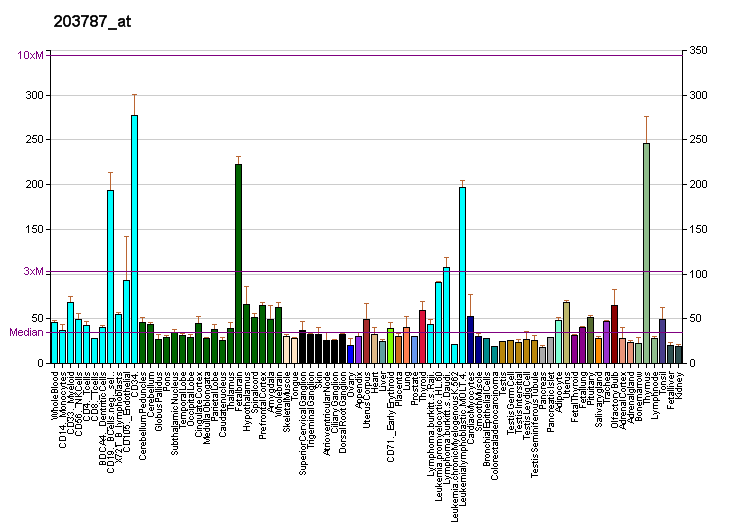

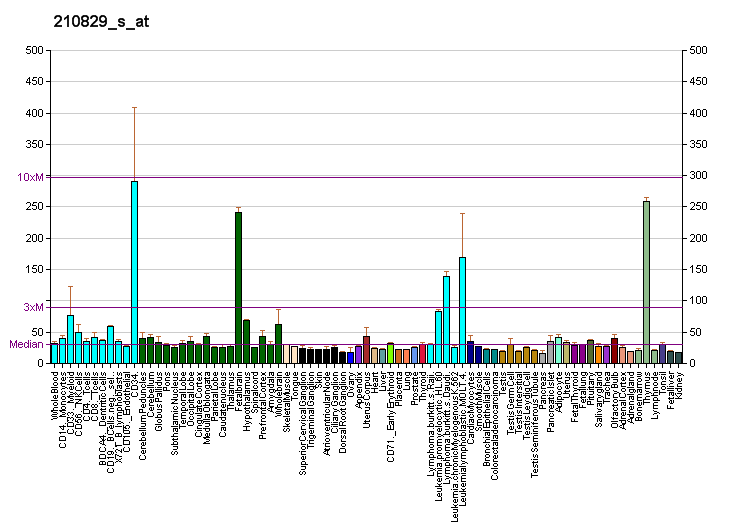
RNA expression pattern
Bgee	Human / Mouse (ortholog); Top expressed in: ventricular zone; ganglionic eminence; Achilles tendon; popliteal artery; tibial arteries; gastric mucosa; Descending thoracic aorta; right coronary artery; canal of the cervix; left ovary / Top expressed in: facial motor nucleus; olfactory epithelium; ciliary body; medial ganglionic eminence; thymus; epithelium of lens; vestibular sensory epithelium; Rostral migratory stream; vas deferens; barrel cortex; More reference expression data
BioGPS	More reference expression data
Gene ontology
Molecular function	single-stranded DNA binding; DNA binding; RNA polymerase II cis-regulatory region sequence-specific DNA binding; DNA-binding transcription activator activity, RNA polymerase II-specific; protein binding
Cellular component	cytoplasm; nucleus
Biological process	regulation of transcription, DNA-templated; transcription by RNA polymerase II; positive regulation of transcription by RNA polymerase II
Sources:Amigo / QuickGO
Orthologs
Databases	NCBI: entry; OMA: entry
Species	Human	Mouse
Entrez	23635	66970
Ensembl	ENSG00000145687	ENSMUSG00000003992
UniProt	P81877	Q9CYZ8
RefSeq (mRNA)	NM_001256732; NM_001256733; NM_001256734; NM_001256735; NM_001256736 NM_012446; NM_001345886; NM_001394350; NM_001394351; NM_001394352	NM_024186; NM_024272; NM_001360775; NM_001360776
RefSeq (protein)	NP_001243661; NP_001243662; NP_001243663; NP_001243664; NP_001243665 NP_001332815; NP_036578	NP_077148; NP_077234; NP_001347704; NP_001347705
Location (UCSC)	Chr 5: 81.41 – 81.75 Mb	Chr 13: 91.46 – 91.7 Mb
PubMed search
- Wikidata
View/Edit Human	View/Edit Mouse

Single-stranded DNA-binding protein 2 is a protein that in humans is encoded by the SSBP2 gene.
