= TFPT =

Protein-coding gene in the species Homo sapiens

Identifiers
- Aliases: TFPT, FB1, INO80F, amida, TCF3 (E2A) fusion partner (in childhood Leukemia), TCF3 fusion partner
- External IDs: OMIM: 609519; MGI: 1916964; GeneCards: TFPT

Gene location (Human)
Chr.	Chromosome 19 (human)
Band	19q13.42	Start	54,107,020 bp
Band	19q13.42	End	54,115,657 bp

Gene location (Mouse)
Chr.	Chromosome 7 (mouse)
Band	7|7 A1	Start	3,623,323 bp
Band	7|7 A1	End	3,632,928 bp
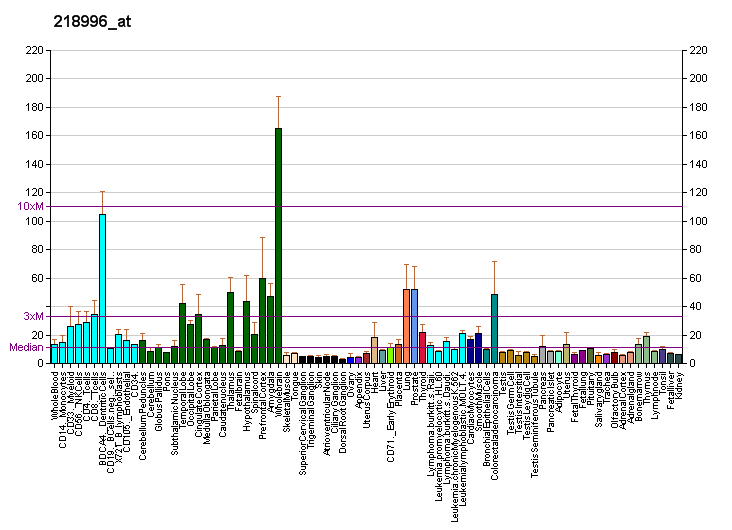
RNA expression pattern
Bgee	Human / Mouse (ortholog); Top expressed in: amygdala; prefrontal cortex; anterior cingulate cortex; hippocampus proper; dorsolateral prefrontal cortex; Brodmann area 9; right frontal lobe; substantia nigra; putamen; hypothalamus / Top expressed in: aortic valve; ascending aorta; supraoptic nucleus; primary oocyte; fossa; internal carotid artery; condyle; yolk sac; motor neuron; hair follicle; More reference expression data
BioGPS	More reference expression data
Gene ontology
Molecular function	DNA binding; protein binding
Cellular component	cytoplasm; nuclear membrane; Ino80 complex; nucleus; nucleoplasm
Biological process	apoptotic signaling pathway; apoptotic process; DNA recombination; regulation of transcription, DNA-templated; DNA repair; transcription, DNA-templated; cellular response to DNA damage stimulus; protein deubiquitination
Sources:Amigo / QuickGO
Orthologs
Databases	NCBI: entry; OMA: entry
Species	Human	Mouse
Entrez	29844	69714
Ensembl	ENSG00000275086; ENSG00000276504; ENSG00000274073; ENSG00000276022; ENSG00000276263 ENSG00000278161; ENSG00000105619; ENSG00000276296; ENSG00000276323; ENSG00000273833	ENSMUSG00000006335
UniProt	P0C1Z6	Q3U1J1
RefSeq (mRNA)	NM_013342; NM_001321792	NM_001290381; NM_023524
RefSeq (protein)	NP_001308721; NP_037474; NP_001308721.1	NP_001277310; NP_076013
Location (UCSC)	Chr 19: 54.11 – 54.12 Mb	Chr 7: 3.62 – 3.63 Mb
PubMed search
- Wikidata
View/Edit Human	View/Edit Mouse

TCF3 fusion partner is a protein that in humans is encoded by the TFPT gene.
