= Tropomodulin 3 =

Protein-coding gene in the species Homo sapiens

TMOD3

Identifiers
- Aliases: TMOD3, UTMOD, tropomodulin 3
- External IDs: OMIM: 605112; MGI: 1355315; GeneCards: TMOD3

Gene location (Human)
| Chr. | Chromosome 15 (human) |
| Band | 15q21.2 | Start | 51,829,628 bp |
| Band | 15q21.2 | End | 51,947,295 bp |

Gene location (Mouse)
| Chr. | Chromosome 9 (mouse) |
| Band | 9 D|9 42.3 cM | Start | 75,404,989 bp |
| Band | 9 D|9 42.3 cM | End | 75,466,939 bp |
RNA expression pattern
| Bgee | Human / Mouse (ortholog); Top expressed in: amniotic fluid; oral cavity; buccal mucosa cell; gums; lower lobe of lung; gingival epithelium; epithelium of colon; skin of hip; Achilles tendon; mucosa of sigmoid colon / Top expressed in: lactiferous gland; Ileal epithelium; corneal stroma; left lung lobe; sciatic nerve; cardiac muscle tissue of left ventricle; seminal vesicula; right lung lobe; blood; genital tubercle; More reference expression data |
| BioGPS | n/a |
Gene ontology
| Molecular function | actin binding; cadherin binding involved in cell-cell adhesion; tropomyosin binding |
| Cellular component | cytoplasm; cytoskeleton; striated muscle thin filament; myofibril |
| Biological process | pointed-end actin filament capping; positive regulation of mitotic cell cycle phase transition; actin cytoskeleton organization; erythrocyte development; cell-cell adhesion; muscle contraction; actin filament organization; myofibril assembly |
Sources:Amigo / QuickGO
Orthologs
| Databases | NCBI: entry; OMA: entry |
| Species | Human | Mouse |
| Entrez | 29766 | 50875 |
| Ensembl | ENSG00000138594 | ENSMUSG00000058587 |
| UniProt | Q9NYL9 | Q9JHJ0 |
| RefSeq (mRNA) | NM_014547 | NM_016963; NM_001357828 |
| RefSeq (protein) | NP_055362 | NP_058659; NP_001344757 |
| Location (UCSC) | Chr 15: 51.83 – 51.95 Mb | Chr 9: 75.4 – 75.47 Mb |
| PubMed search |
- Wikidata
| View/Edit Human | View/Edit Mouse |

Tropomodulin-3 is a protein that in humans is encoded by the TMOD3 gene.

Tropomodulin-3 (Tmod3) is a member of the tropomodulin family of actin-regulatory proteins that plays a key role in modulating the dynamics of the cytoskeleton by capping the pointed (minus) ends of actin filaments. Unlike some other tropomodulin isoforms, Tmod3 is widely expressed in non-muscle cells, where it contributes to essential cellular processes such as shape maintenance, motility, and adhesion. It regulates filament stability by preventing both polymerization and depolymerization at the pointed end, thus helping to define actin filament length and organization. In endothelial cells, Tmod3 has been shown to inhibit cell motility through its capping activity, highlighting its role as a negative regulator of actin-driven migration. Additionally, Tmod3 can bind not only to filamentous actin but also directly to actin monomers, suggesting a broader function in actin filament turnover and cytoskeletal remodeling.
