= TEX19 =

Protein-coding gene in the species Homo sapiens

Identifiers
- Aliases: TEX19, testis expressed 19
- External IDs: OMIM: 615647; MGI: 1918206; HomoloGene: 132323; GeneCards: TEX19; OMA:TEX19 - orthologs

Gene location (Human)
Chr.	Chromosome 17 (human)
Band	17q25.3	Start	82,359,247 bp
Band	17q25.3	End	82,363,775 bp

Gene location (Mouse)
Chr.	Chromosome 11 (mouse)
Band	11|11 E2	Start	121,007,041 bp
Band	11|11 E2	End	121,009,503 bp
RNA expression pattern
Bgee	Human / Mouse (ortholog); Top expressed in: secondary oocyte; testicle; right testis; left testis; gonad; mucosa of ileum; human musculoskeletal system; muscular system; muscle; skeletal muscle / Top expressed in: spermatocyte; seminiferous tubule; epithelium of seminiferous tubule of testis; Sertoli cell; primary oocyte; blastocyst; blastocyst; morula; Gonadal ridge; fetal liver hematopoietic progenitor cell; More reference expression data
BioGPS	n/a
Gene ontology
Molecular function	protein binding; piRNA binding
Cellular component	cytoplasm; nucleus
Biological process	meiosis; cell differentiation; reciprocal meiotic recombination; male meiotic nuclear division; spermatogenesis; negative regulation of transposition; placenta development; male gonad development
Sources:Amigo / QuickGO
Orthologs
Species	Human	Mouse
Entrez	400629	70956
Ensembl	ENSG00000182459	ENSMUSG00000039337
UniProt	Q8NA77	Q9D5S1
RefSeq (mRNA)	NM_207459	NM_027622
RefSeq (protein)	NP_997342	NP_081898
Location (UCSC)	Chr 17: 82.36 – 82.36 Mb	Chr 11: 121.01 – 121.01 Mb
PubMed search
- Wikidata
View/Edit Human	View/Edit Mouse

Testis expressed 19 is a protein that in humans is encoded by the TEX19 gene.
