= SLC25A46 =

Protein-coding gene in the species Homo sapiens

Identifiers
- Aliases: SLC25A46, HMSN6B, solute carrier family 25 member 46, PCH1E
- External IDs: OMIM: 610826; MGI: 1914703; GeneCards: SLC25A46

Gene location (Human)
Chr.	Chromosome 5 (human)
Band	5q22.1	Start	110,738,136 bp
Band	5q22.1	End	110,765,161 bp

Gene location (Mouse)
Chr.	Chromosome 18 (mouse)
Band	18|18 B1	Start	31,689,164 bp
Band	18|18 B1	End	31,742,964 bp
RNA expression pattern
Bgee	Human / Mouse (ortholog); Top expressed in: secondary oocyte; sperm; lateral nuclear group of thalamus; right ventricle; Achilles tendon; pars compacta; biceps brachii; jejunal mucosa; pons; pars reticulata / Top expressed in: supraoptic nucleus; Epithelium of choroid plexus; Region I of hippocampus proper; trigeminal ganglion; pineal gland; superior cervical ganglion; interventricular septum; medial dorsal nucleus; substantia nigra; extraocular muscle; More reference expression data
BioGPS	n/a
Gene ontology
Molecular function	protein binding
Cellular component	integral component of membrane; membrane; mitochondrial outer membrane; mitochondrion
Biological process	mitochondrial membrane fission
Sources:Amigo / QuickGO
Orthologs
Databases	NCBI: entry; OMA: entry
Species	Human	Mouse
Entrez	91137	67453
Ensembl	ENSG00000164209	ENSMUSG00000024259
UniProt	Q96AG3	Q9CQS4
RefSeq (mRNA)	NM_001303249; NM_001303250; NM_138773	NM_026165; NM_001357461
RefSeq (protein)	NP_001290178; NP_001290179; NP_620128	NP_080441; NP_001344390
Location (UCSC)	Chr 5: 110.74 – 110.77 Mb	Chr 18: 31.69 – 31.74 Mb
PubMed search
- Wikidata
View/Edit Human	View/Edit Mouse

Solute carrier family 25 member 46 is a protein that in humans is encoded by the SLC25A46 gene. This protein is a member of the SLC25 mitochondrial solute carrier family. It is a transmembrane protein located in the mitochondrial outer membrane involved in lipid transfer from the endoplasmic reticulum (ER) to mitochondria. Mutations in this gene result in neuropathy and optic atrophy.

== Structure ==
The SLC25A46 gene is located on the q arm of chromosome 5 in position 22.1 and spans 27,039 base pairs. The gene produces a 46.2 kDa protein composed of 418 amino acids. This gene has 8 exons and encodes a multi-pass integral membrane protein localized to the mitochondrial outer membrane.

== Function ==
The encoded protein is an orphan transporter involved in lipid transfer from the endoplasmic reticulum to mitochondria. It promotes mitochondrial fission and prevents the formation of hyperfilamentous mitochondria. This protein forms a complex with mitofilin (IMMT) on the inner mitochondrial membrane, independent of MFN2.

== Clinical Significance ==
Mutations in the SLC25A46 gene, inherited in an autosomal recessive manner, cause type 6B hereditary motor and sensory neuropathy. Symptoms include early-onset optic atrophy, progressive visual loss, and peripheral sensorimotor neuropathy manifesting as axonal Charcot-Marie-Tooth disease, with variable age at onset and severity.

Overexpression of this protein causes mitochondrial fragmentation while knockdown of this protein causes mitochondrial hyperfusion and hyperfilamentous mitochondria due to decreased mitochondrial fission. Loss of this gene also has many other effects: premature cellular senescence, impaired cellular respiration, destabilization of the MICOS (mitochondrial contact site and cristae organizing system) complex, loss of and shortened cristae, altered ER morphology, impaired cell migration, and changes in mitochondrial phospholipid composition.

== Interactions ==
This protein interacts with IMMT, a component of the MICOS complex, along with other components of this complex and components of an ER membrane protein complex involved in transferring lipids to mitochondria. Additionally, this protein interacts with SLC7A8, SLC10A1, SLC10A6, FHL3, FUNDC1, linc01142, LEPROTL1, ODF4, VMA21, MFSD14B, PQLC1, HSD17B11, REEP2, REEP4, and TOMM22. This protein possibly interacts with OPA1 and MFN2.
