= MARCH5 =

Protein-coding gene in the species Homo sapiens

MARCHF5

Identifiers
- Aliases: MARCHF5, MARCH-V, MITOL, RNF153, membrane associated ring-CH-type finger 5, MARCH5
- External IDs: OMIM: 610637; MGI: 1915207; GeneCards: MARCHF5
Enzyme activity
EC #	BRENDA	ExPASy	KEGG	MetaCyc
2.3.2.27	↗	↗	↗	↗

Gene location (Human)
Chr.	Chromosome 10 (human)
Band	10q23.32-q23.33	Start	92,291,167 bp
Band	10q23.32-q23.33	End	92,353,964 bp

Gene location (Mouse)
Chr.	Chromosome 19 (mouse)
Band	19|19 C2	Start	37,184,942 bp
Band	19|19 C2	End	37,199,550 bp
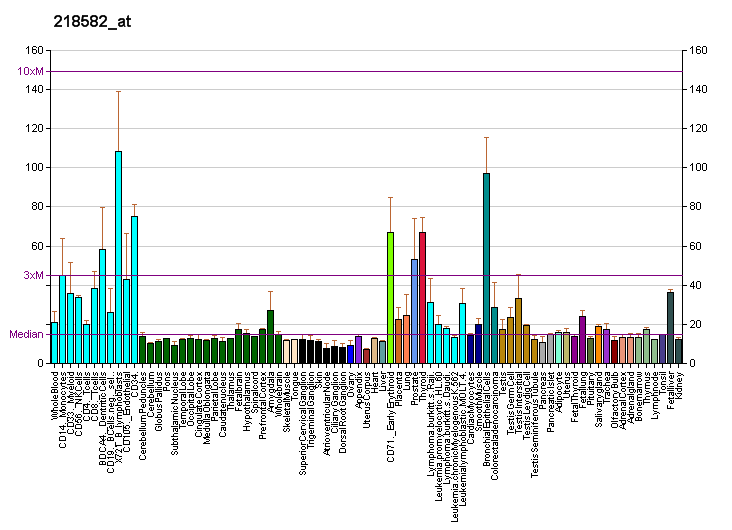
RNA expression pattern
Bgee	Human / Mouse (ortholog); Top expressed in: sperm; secondary oocyte; ganglionic eminence; islet of Langerhans; cartilage tissue; right adrenal gland; right adrenal cortex; ventricular zone; minor salivary glands; amniotic fluid / Top expressed in: zygote; ventricular zone; right kidney; muscle of thigh; tail of embryo; primary visual cortex; genital tubercle; superior frontal gyrus; embryo; dentate gyrus of hippocampal formation granule cell; More reference expression data
BioGPS	More reference expression data
Gene ontology
Molecular function	GTPase binding; zinc ion binding; protein binding; metal ion binding; ubiquitin-protein transferase activity; transferase activity
Cellular component	integral component of membrane; mitochondrial outer membrane; endoplasmic reticulum membrane; endoplasmic reticulum; membrane; mitochondrion
Biological process	protein localization to mitochondrion; protein polyubiquitination; regulation of mitochondrial fission; positive regulation of mitochondrial fission; protein ubiquitination; protein autoubiquitination
Sources:Amigo / QuickGO
Orthologs
Databases	NCBI: entry; OMA: entry
Species	Human	Mouse
Entrez	54708	69104
Ensembl	ENSG00000198060	ENSMUSG00000023307
UniProt	Q9NX47	Q3KNM2
RefSeq (mRNA)	NM_017824	NM_001164336; NM_001164337; NM_027314; NM_001378797; NM_001378798
RefSeq (protein)	NP_060294	NP_001157808; NP_001157809; NP_081590; NP_001365726; NP_001365727
Location (UCSC)	Chr 10: 92.29 – 92.35 Mb	Chr 19: 37.18 – 37.2 Mb
PubMed search
- Wikidata
View/Edit Human	View/Edit Mouse

E3 ubiquitin-protein ligase MARCH5, also known as membrane-associated ring finger (C3HC4) 5, is an enzyme that, in humans, is encoded by the MARCH5 gene. It is localized in the mitochondrial outer membrane and has four transmembrane domains.

== Structure ==
=== Gene ===
The human gene MARCH5, also known as MITOL or RNF153, has 7 Exons and locates at the chromosome band 10q23.32-q23.33.

=== Protein ===
The human E3 ubiquitin-protein ligase MARCH5 protein, a member of the transmembrane RING‐finger protein family is 31 kDa in size and composed of 278 amino acids with a N-terminal Zinc-finger domain at amino acid sequence 6-75 and four C-terminal transmembrane spans. The theoretical PI of this protein is 9.00.

== Function ==
As an E3 ubiquitin ligases, enzyme MARCH 5 catalyzes the transfer of ubiquitin from an E2 ubiquitin-conjugating enzyme to an identified protein substrate. MARCH5 was firstly identified as a mitofusin 2- and Drp1-binding protein. MARCH5 promotes ubiquitination of Drp1 and a knockdown of MARCH5 is by RNAi led to abnormal mitochondrial fusion. Further evidences show that MARCH 5 specifically interacts with mitofusin 1, by reducing the levels of it during certain phases of the cell cycle. Given the facts that MARCH5 regulates the protein proteostasis of Drp1, mitofusin 1, and mitofusin 2 that are pivotal regulators of mitochondrial fusion and fission, MARCH5 is critical for the regulation of standard mitochondria morphology, and deficiencies in it promote cellular senescence.

== Clinical significance ==
Considering that both Drp1 and MAP1B are substrates for MITOL, MITOL is thought to play a protective role against nitrosative stress-mediated disruption of mitochondrial dynamics such as morphological stability and transport of mitochondria. As significantly decreased expression of MITOL occurs in response to ageing in normal tissues, MITOL may control ageing by regulating the production of ROS in mitochondria. From a pathological perspective, in a neuronal cell model, dominant-negative MARCH5 prevents mitochondrial fragmentation during neurodegenerative stress induced by the neuron-specific reactive oxygen generator 6-hydroxydopamine, the complex I inhibitor rotenone or Alzheimer's-related amyloid beta peptide. MARCH5 is also involved in the removal of proteins associated with specific neurodegenerative disorders such as ataxin-3 in Machado–Joseph disease or mSOD1 in amyotrophic lateral sclerosis likely supporting mitochondrial function. MARCH5 has also been linked to toll-like receptors (TLRs), which recognize distinct pathogen-associated molecular patterns and play a critical role in the innate immune response.

Ubiquitin-dependent degradation pathways have clear cancer relevance due to their integral involvement in protein quality control, regulation of immune responses, signal transduction, and cell cycle regulation.

== Gene name error in Excel ==
Like the other MARCH and septin genes, care must be exercised when analyzing genetic data containing the MARCH5 gene in Microsoft Excel. This is due to Excel's autocorrect feature treating the MARCH gene as a date and converting it to a standard date format. The original text cannot be recovered as a result of the conversion. A 2016 study found up to 19.6% of all papers in selected journals to be affected by the gene name error. The issue can be prevented by using an alias name such as MARCHF5, prepending with an apostrophe ('), or preformatting the cell as text.
