= MFN2 =

Protein-coding gene in humans

Identifiers
- Aliases: MFN2, CMT2A, CMT2A2, CPRP1, HSG, MARF, HMSN6A, mitofusin 2, CMT2A2A, CMT2A2B
- External IDs: OMIM: 608507; MGI: 2442230; GeneCards: MFN2

Gene location (Human)
Chr.	Chromosome 1 (human)
Band	1p36.22	Start	11,980,181 bp
Band	1p36.22	End	12,015,211 bp

Gene location (Mouse)
Chr.	Chromosome 4 (mouse)
Band	4|4 E1	Start	147,958,056 bp
Band	4|4 E1	End	147,989,161 bp
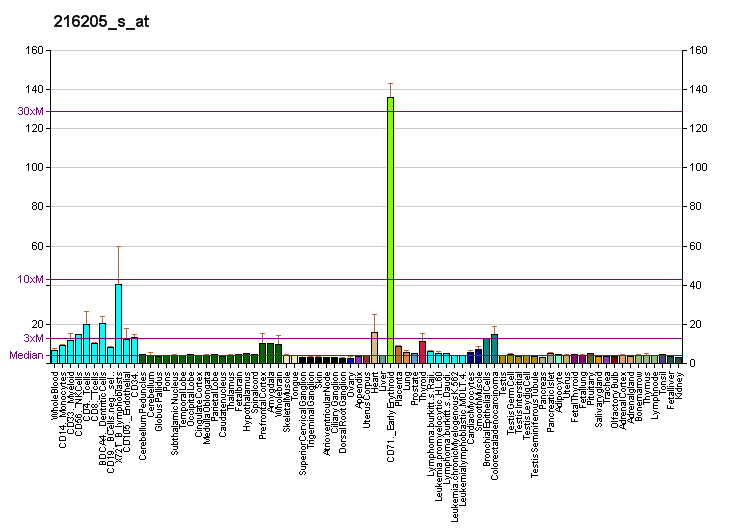

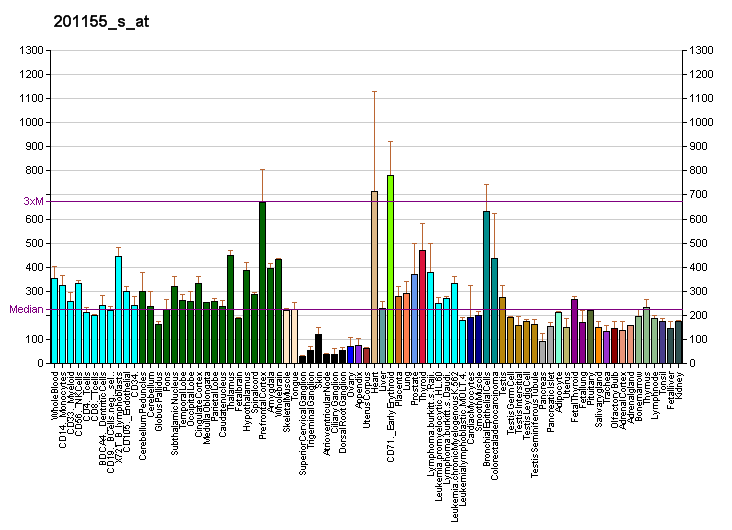
RNA expression pattern
Bgee	Human / Mouse (ortholog); Top expressed in: apex of heart; left ventricle; muscle of thigh; right auricle of heart; gastrocnemius muscle; myocardium of left ventricle; cardiac muscle tissue of right atrium; optic nerve; Skeletal muscle tissue of rectus abdominis; thoracic diaphragm / Top expressed in: interventricular septum; myocardium of ventricle; digastric muscle; muscle of thigh; skeletal muscle tissue; temporal muscle; quadriceps femoris muscle; soleus muscle; vastus lateralis muscle; right ventricle; More reference expression data
BioGPS	More reference expression data
Gene ontology
Molecular function	nucleotide binding; GTP binding; protein binding; hydrolase activity; ubiquitin protein ligase binding; GTPase activity
Cellular component	cytosol; membrane; microtubule cytoskeleton; mitochondrial outer membrane; mitochondrion; integral component of membrane; intrinsic component of mitochondrial outer membrane
Biological process	mitochondrial fusion; negative regulation of smooth muscle cell proliferation; protein localization to phagophore assembly site; mitochondrion localization; protein targeting to mitochondrion; blood coagulation; blastocyst formation; negative regulation of Ras protein signal transduction; autophagy; response to unfolded protein; macroautophagy; mitochondrial membrane organization; camera-type eye morphogenesis; apoptotic process; parkin-mediated stimulation of mitophagy in response to mitochondrial depolarization; positive regulation of vascular associated smooth muscle cell proliferation; positive regulation of vascular associated smooth muscle cell apoptotic process; positive regulation of cold-induced thermogenesis
Sources:Amigo / QuickGO
Orthologs
Databases	NCBI: entry; OMA: entry
Species	Human	Mouse
Entrez	9927	170731
Ensembl	ENSG00000116688	ENSMUSG00000029020
UniProt	O95140	Q80U63
RefSeq (mRNA)	NM_001127660; NM_014874	NM_001285920; NM_001285921; NM_001285922; NM_001285923; NM_133201 NM_001355590; NM_001355591
RefSeq (protein)	NP_001121132; NP_055689	NP_001272849; NP_001272850; NP_001272851; NP_001272852; NP_573464 NP_001342519; NP_001342520
Location (UCSC)	Chr 1: 11.98 – 12.02 Mb	Chr 4: 147.96 – 147.99 Mb
PubMed search
- Wikidata
View/Edit Human	View/Edit Mouse

Mitofusin-2 is a protein that in humans is encoded by the MFN2 gene. Mitofusins are GTPases embedded in the outer membrane of the mitochondria. In mammals MFN1 and MFN2 are essential for mitochondrial fusion. In addition to the mitofusins, OPA1 regulates inner mitochondrial membrane fusion, and DRP1 is responsible for mitochondrial fission.

Mitofusin-2 (MFN2) is a mitochondrial membrane protein that plays a central role in regulating mitochondrial fusion and cell metabolism. More specifically, MFN2 is a dynamin-like GTPase embedded in the outer mitochondrial membrane (OMM) which in turn affects mitochondrial dynamics, distribution, quality control, and function.

== Structure ==
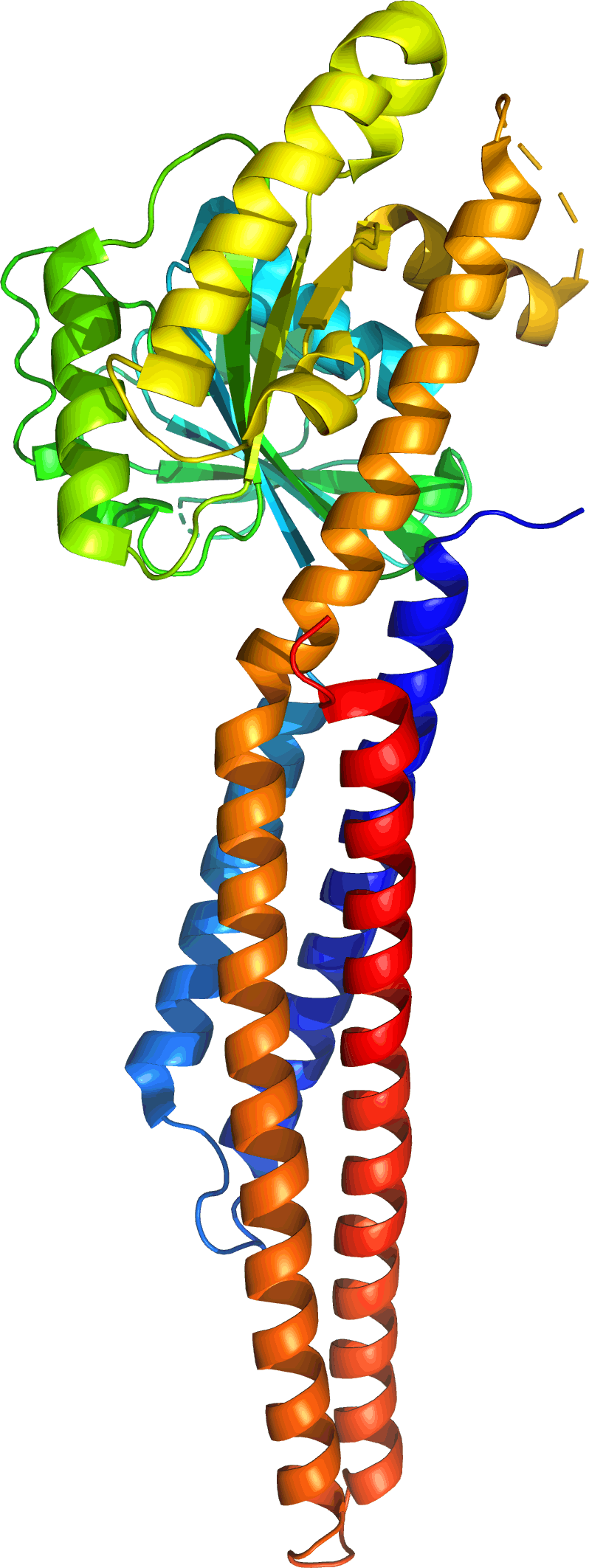
Crystallographic structure of the Mitofusin-2 protein (rainbow colored, N-terminus = blue, C-terminus = red)

MFN2 tertiary structure

The human mitofusin-2 protein contains 757 amino acid residues. The MFN2 comprises a large cytosolic GTPase domain at the N-terminal, followed by a coiled-coil heptad-repeat (HR1) domain, a proline-rich (PR) region, two sequential transmembrane (TM) domains crossing the OMM and a second cytosolic heptad-repeat (HR2) domain at the C-terminal. MFN2 has been shown by electron microscopy (EM) to accumulate in contact regions between adjacent mitochondria, supporting their role in mitochondrial fusion. Seminal studies revealed that both, MFN1 and MFN2 spanning from the OMM of two opposing mitochondria, physically interact in trans, by the formation of antiparallel dimers between their HR2 domains.

== Regulation ==
MFN2 is principally regulated by proteosomal pathway. Several E3 ubiquitin ligases regulate MFN2 abundance and function through ubiquitination, influencing mitochondrial dynamics and quality control. These include MARCH5 (also known as MITOL), RFFL, MUL1, gp78 (AMFR), HUWE1 and Parkin, which have been implicated in the regulation of mitofusins under different physiological and stress conditions. Depending on the ligase and cellular context, MFN2 ubiquitination can promote protein degradation, alter mitochondrial morphology, or contribute to mitophagy.

== Function ==
A pivotal in vivo study revealed that MFN2 is essential for embryonic development, thus, the deletion of MFN2 in mice is lethal during midgestation. The inactivation of MFN2 alleles after placentation also revealed that MFN2 ablation severely impairs cerebellum development. It has been also described that Mfn1 and Mfn2 are ubiquitously expressed yet they display different relative levels of expression between tissues, with MFN2 being the predominantly expressed mitofusin in the brain and MFN1 in the heart. This tissue-specific expression could be one of the reasons its ablation induces cerebellar-specific impairments.

=== Mitochondrial fusion and fission ===
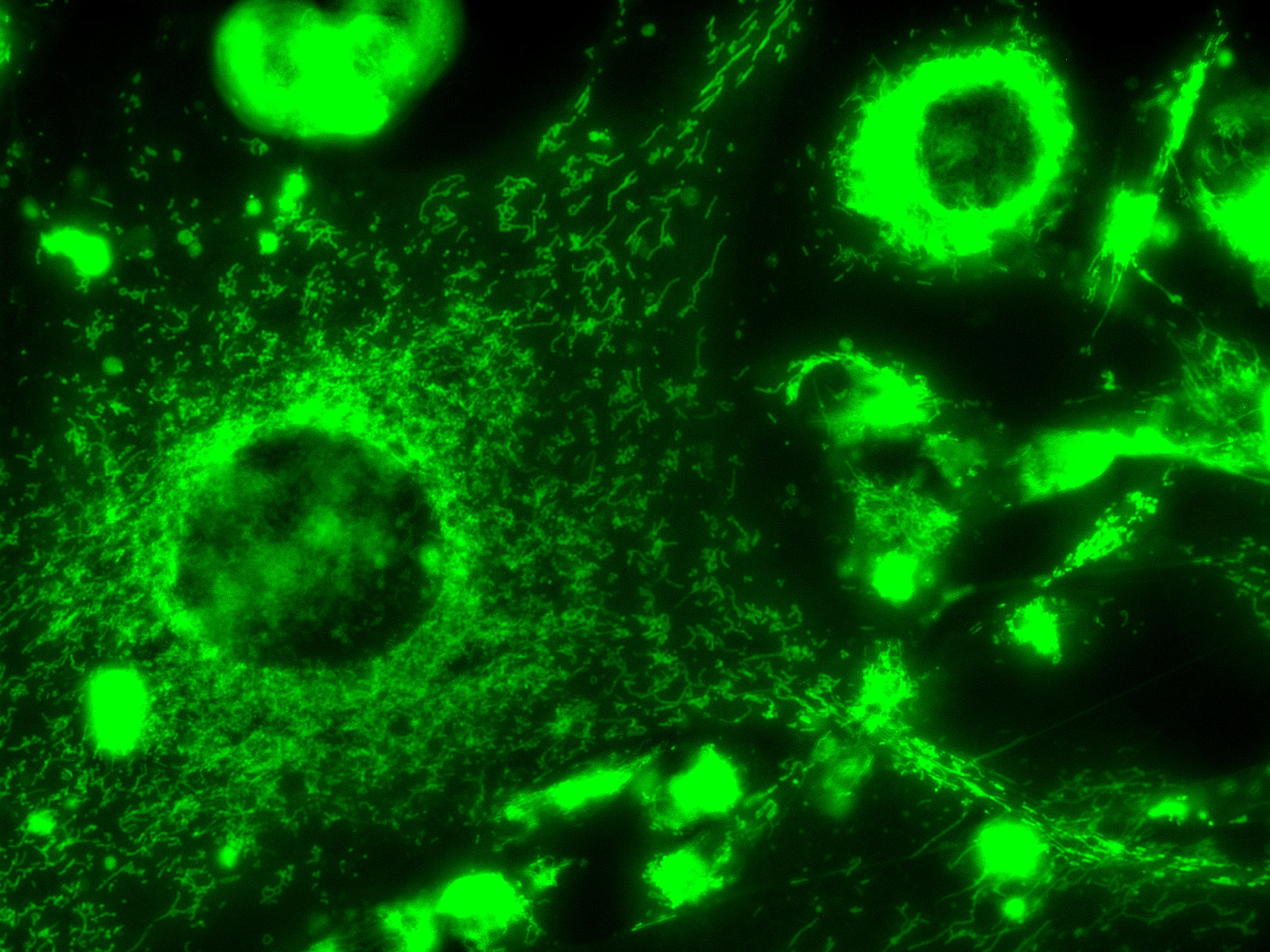
Interconnected green fluorescent stained mitochondria confer what is known as "mitochondrial network", which is constantly undergoing through processes of fusion and fission in order to maintain cell distribution and size

MFN2 is a mitochondrial membrane protein that participates in mitochondrial fusion and contributes to the maintenance and operation of the mitochondrial network. Mitochondria function as a dynamic network constantly undergoing fusion and fission. The balance between fusion and fission is important in maintaining the integrity of the mitochondria and facilitates the mixing of the membranes and the exchange of DNA between mitochondria. MFN1 and MFN2 mediate outer membrane fusion, OPA1 is involved in inner membrane fusion, and DRP1 is responsible for mitochondrial fission.

Mitochondrial fusion is unique because it involves two membranes: the OMM and the inner mitochondrial membrane (IMM), that must be rearranged in a coordinated manner in order to maintain organelle integrity. Recent studies have shown that MFN2-deficient cells display an aberrant mitochondrial morphology, with a clear fragmentation of the network.

Mitochondrial fusion is essential for embryonic development. Knockout mice for either MFN1 or MFN2 have fusion deficits and die midgestation. MFN2 knockout mice die at embryonic day 11.5 due to a defect in the giant cell layer of the placenta. Mitochondrial fusion is also important for mitochondrial transport and localization in neuronal processes. Conditional MFN2 knockout mice show degeneration in the Purkinje cells of the cerebellum, as well as improperly localized mitochondria in the dendrites. MFN2 also associates with the MIRO-Milton complex which links the mitochondria to the kinesin motor.

=== Er-mitochondria contacts ===
MFN2 has also been suggested to be a key regulator of ER-mitochondria contiguity, though its exact function in this inter-organelle still remains unknown. Small fractions of MFN2 have been observed to be located in ER membranes, particularly in the so called ER mitochondria-associated membranes (MAM). Several processes known to take place at MAM, such as autophagosomes formation have been claimed to be modulated by the presence of MFN2.

=== Axonal transport of mitochondria ===
MFN2 has been proposed to be essential for the transport of mitochondria along axons, being involved in their attachment to microtubules through interaction with the two main motor proteins Miro and Milton.

Other intracellular pathways, such as cell cycle progression, maintenance of mitochondrial bioenergetics, apoptosis, and autophagy, have been demonstrated to be modulated by MFN2.

== Clinical significance ==
The importance of a regulated mitochondrial morphology in cell physiology makes immediately clear the potential impact of MFN2 in the onset/progression of different pathological conditions.

=== Charcot–marie–tooth disease type 2a (CMT2A) ===
Charcot-Marie-Tooth disease type 2A (CMT2A) is caused by mutations in the MFN2 gene. MFN2 mutations are linked to neurological disorders characterized by a wide clinical phenotype that involves the central and peripheral nervous system. The impairment of the former is rarer while neuropathy forms are more frequent and severe, involving both legs and arms, with weakness, sensory loss, and optical atrophy. All these complex phenotypes are clinically collected in the neurological disorder CMT2A, a subtype of a heterogeneous group of congenital neuromuscular diseases which affect motor and sensory neurons, called CMT disease.

Among different cell types, neurons are particularly sensitive to MFN2 defects: to work properly, these cells need functional mitochondria located at specific sites to support adequate ATP production and Ca^{2+} buffering. A defective mitochondrial fusion has been suggested to participate in the pathogenesis of CMT2A. Another important cell feature altered in the presence of MFN2 mutations is mitochondrial transport and indeed current models propose this defect as the major cause of CMT2A.

Mutations in OPA1 also cause optic atrophy, which suggests a common role of mitochondrial fusion in neuronal dysfunction. The exact mechanism of how mutations in MFN2 selectively cause the degeneration of long peripheral axons is not known. There is evidence suggesting that it could be due to defects in the axonal transport of mitochondria.

=== Alzheimer's disease ===
Increasing evidence suggests a possible link between MFN2 deregulation and Alzheimer's disease (AD). In particular, MFN2 protein and mRNA levels are decreased in the frontal cortex of patients with AD, as well as in hippocampal neurons of post-mortem AD patients. Notably, the cortex and hippocampus are the brain's areas in which a major neuronal impairment is observed in AD. Interestingly, the MFN2 gene is located on chromosome 1p36, which has been suggested to be an AD-associated locus. However, it is currently unknown whether MFN2 alterations are causative for the pathology or just a consequence of AD. In particular, it is not clear if MFN2 is linked to AD through its effects on mitochondria or by affecting other pathways.

In summary, mitochondrial dysfunction is a prominent feature of AD neurons. It has been described that levels of DRP1, OPA1, MFN1, and MFN2 are significantly reduced whereas levels of Fis1 are significantly increased in AD.

=== Parkinson's disease ===
MFN2 is a key substrate of the PINK1/parkin couple, whose mutations are linked to the familial forms of Parkinson's disease (PD). MFN2 has been demonstrated to be essential for axonal projections of midbrain dopaminergic (DA) neurons that are affected in PD. MFN2 alterations in the progression of PD, considering the capacity of PINK1 and parkin to trigger post-translational modifications in their substrates, have yet to be evaluated.

=== Obesity/diabetes/insulin resistance ===
The MFN2 protein may play a role in the pathophysiology of obesity. In obesity and type II diabetes, MFN2 expression has been found to be reduced. In turn, MFN2 down-regulation activates JNK pathway, favouring the formation of lipid intermediates that lead to insulin resistance. Recent studies have also shown that mitochondria arrest fusion by down-regulating MFN2 in obesity and diabetes, which leads to a fragmented mitochondrial network. This fragmentation is obvious in the pancreatic beta-cells in the Islets of Langerhans and can inhibit mitochondrial quality control mechanisms such as mitophagy and autophagy, leading to a defect in insulin secretion and eventual beta-cell failure. The expression of MFN2 in skeletal muscle is proportional to insulin sensitivity in this tissue, and its expression is reduced in high-fat diet fed mice and Zucker fatty rats.

=== Cardiomyopathies ===
In heart, the embryonic combined MFN1/MFN2 deletion is lethal for mice embryo, while in adults it induces a progressive and lethal dilated cardiomyopathy. A modest cardiac hypertrophy, associated to a tendency of MFN2-deprived mitochondria was observed caused by an increased resistance to Ca^{2+}-mediated cell death stimuli. Furthermore, reduced expression of MFN2 and subsequent disruption of sarcoplasmic reticulum-mitochondrial contacts was observed to associate with atrial fibrillation in Drosophila. While it is undisputed the importance of MFN2 in cardiomyocytes physiology, clarification of whether its pro-fusion activity or other functionalities of the protein are involved will require further investigations.

=== Cancer ===
Studying the mechanisms of mitochondrial function, more specifically MFN2 function, during tumorigenesis is critical for the next generation of cancer therapeutics. Recent studies have shown that dysregulation of the mitochondrial network can have an effect on MFN2 proteins, provoking mitochondrial hyperfusion and a multidrug resistant (MDR) phenotype in cancer cells. MDR cancer cells have a much more aggressive behaviour and they are very invasive with a better ability to metastasize. All these factors lead to a poor cancer prognosis and, therefore, novel therapeutic strategies for targeting and eradicating MDR TNBC cells are required. It has been hypothesized that mitochondrial hyperfusion is one of the main mechanisms that makes cells resistant to traditional chemotherapy treatments. Hence, inhibiting mitochondrial fusion would sensitize cancer cells to chemotherapy, making it a significantly more effective treatment. In order to inhibit mitochondrial hyperfusion, an anti-MFN2 peptide has to be used, in order to bind to the mitochondria membrane MFN2 proteins to prevent them from building the mitochondrial network. The aim of the anti-MFN2 peptide is to make MFN2 not functional so it cannot participate in mitochondrial fusion and in the operation of the mitochondrial network. In this way, hyperfusion will not occur and chemotherapy drugs would be much more successful. However, further investigations are required in this field as there are still lots of unknowns.
