= MIEF1 =

Protein-coding gene in humans

Identifiers
- Aliases: MIEF1, HSU79252, MID51, SMCR7L, dJ1104E15.3, mitochondrial elongation factor 1, AltMIEF1-MP
- External IDs: OMIM: 615497; MGI: 2146020; GeneCards: MIEF1
Available structures
PDB	Ortholog search: PDBe RCSB
PDB	List of PDB id codes 4NXT, 4NXU, 4NXV, 4NXW, 4NXX

Gene location (Human)
Chr.	Chromosome 22 (human)
Band	22q13.1	Start	39,499,432 bp
Band	22q13.1	End	39,518,132 bp

Gene location (Mouse)
Chr.	Chromosome 15 (mouse)
Band	15|15 E1	Start	80,118,219 bp
Band	15|15 E1	End	80,137,572 bp
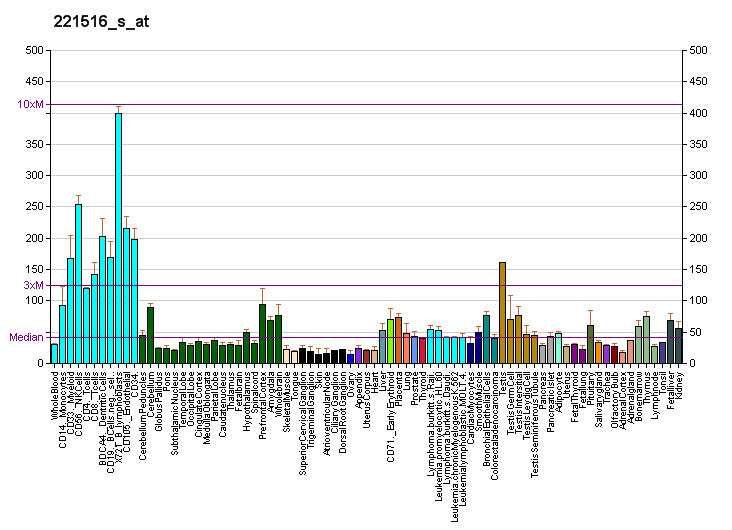

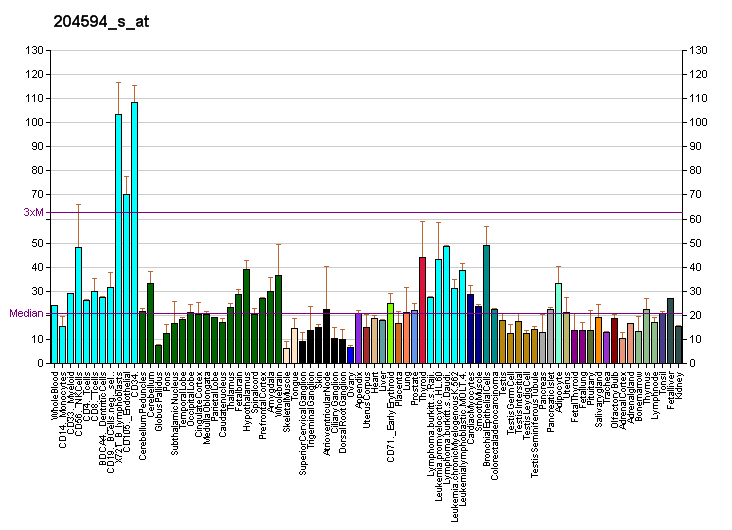

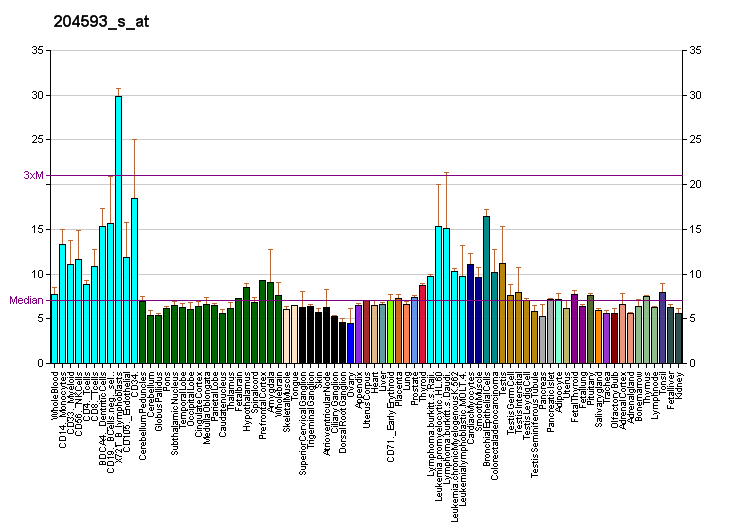
RNA expression pattern
Bgee	Human / Mouse (ortholog); Top expressed in: sperm; secondary oocyte; right testis; left testis; vena cava; endothelial cell; body of tongue; pancreatic ductal cell; cerebellar vermis; ventricular zone / Top expressed in: zygote; spermatocyte; spermatid; genital tubercle; tail of embryo; hand; superior cervical ganglion; neural tube; lacrimal gland; interventricular septum; More reference expression data
BioGPS	More reference expression data
Gene ontology
Molecular function	nucleotide binding; ADP binding; protein binding; GDP binding; identical protein binding
Cellular component	integral component of membrane; mitochondrial outer membrane; peroxisome; membrane; mitochondrion; mitochondrial matrix; mitochondrial large ribosomal subunit
Biological process	mitochondrial fusion; positive regulation of mitochondrial fission; mitochondrial fission; positive regulation of protein targeting to membrane; regulation of translation; ribosome biogenesis; positive regulation of mitochondrial translation
Sources:Amigo / QuickGO
Orthologs
Databases	NCBI: entry; OMA: entry
Species	Human	Mouse
Entrez	54471	239555
Ensembl	ENSG00000100335	ENSMUSG00000022412
UniProt	L0R8F8	Q8BGV8
RefSeq (mRNA)	NM_001304564; NM_013298; NM_019008; NM_001394030	NM_178719; NM_001357659; NM_001357660
RefSeq (protein)	NP_001291493; NP_061881	NP_848834; NP_001344588; NP_001344589
Location (UCSC)	Chr 22: 39.5 – 39.52 Mb	Chr 15: 80.12 – 80.14 Mb
PubMed search
- Wikidata
View/Edit Human	View/Edit Mouse

Mitochondrial elongation factor 1 (MIEF1) is a protein that in humans is encoded by the gene MIEF1 (previously SMCR7L). It has also been called Mitochondrial dynamic protein MID51 (MID51).

== Function ==
The MIEF1 gene codes for a protein has been shown to regulate mitochondrial fission by interacting with the proteins Drp1 and FIS1.

== See also ==
- MIEF2
