= MUL1 =

Protein found in humans

Identifiers
- Aliases: MUL1, C1orf166, GIDE, MAPL, MULAN, RNF218, mitochondrial E3 ubiquitin protein ligase 1
- External IDs: OMIM: 612037; MGI: 1915600; GeneCards: MUL1
Enzyme activity
EC #	BRENDA	ExPASy	KEGG	MetaCyc
2.3.2.27	↗	↗	↗	↗

Gene location (Human)
Chr.	Chromosome 1 (human)
Band	1p36.12	Start	20,499,448 bp
Band	1p36.12	End	20,508,151 bp

Gene location (Mouse)
Chr.	Chromosome 4 (mouse)
Band	4|4 D3	Start	138,161,982 bp
Band	4|4 D3	End	138,169,576 bp
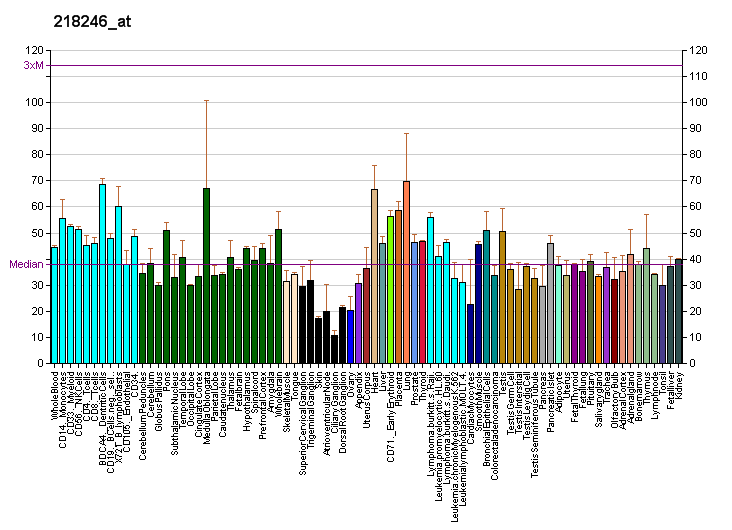
RNA expression pattern
Bgee	Human / Mouse (ortholog); Top expressed in: apex of heart; left ventricle; gastrocnemius muscle; muscle of thigh; mucosa of transverse colon; islet of Langerhans; stromal cell of endometrium; right auricle of heart; muscle layer of sigmoid colon; right adrenal cortex / Top expressed in: facial motor nucleus; spermatocyte; motor neuron; spermatid; seminiferous tubule; interventricular septum; substantia nigra; muscle of thigh; yolk sac; Epithelium of choroid plexus; More reference expression data
BioGPS	More reference expression data
Gene ontology
Molecular function	SUMO transferase activity; signal transducer activity; metal ion binding; ubiquitin-protein transferase activity; protein binding; identical protein binding; ubiquitin protein ligase binding; transferase activity
Cellular component	integral component of membrane; membrane; peroxisome; integral component of mitochondrial outer membrane; axon; mitochondrial outer membrane; soma; mitochondrion
Biological process	negative regulation of protein kinase B signaling; positive regulation of mitochondrial fission; regulation of protein stability; mitochondrial fission; regulation of mitochondrion organization; negative regulation of chemokine (C-C motif) ligand 5 production; mitochondrion localization; negative regulation of type I interferon-mediated signaling pathway; protein stabilization; positive regulation of protein sumoylation; protein sumoylation; regulation of mitochondrial membrane potential; negative regulation of defense response to virus by host; regulation of mitochondrial outer membrane permeabilization involved in apoptotic signaling pathway; negative regulation of cell growth; protein ubiquitination; protein destabilization; cellular response to exogenous dsRNA; negative regulation of innate immune response; positive regulation of I-kappaB kinase/NF-kappaB signaling; positive regulation of dendrite extension; negative regulation of mitochondrial fusion; activation of cysteine-type endopeptidase activity involved in apoptotic process; apoptotic process; organelle organization; positive regulation of autophagy of mitochondrion in response to mitochondrial depolarization
Sources:Amigo / QuickGO
Orthologs
Databases	NCBI: entry; OMA: entry
Species	Human	Mouse
Entrez	79594	68350
Ensembl	ENSG00000090432	ENSMUSG00000041241
UniProt	Q969V5	Q8VCM5
RefSeq (mRNA)	NM_024544	NM_026689
RefSeq (protein)	NP_078820	NP_080965
Location (UCSC)	Chr 1: 20.5 – 20.51 Mb	Chr 4: 138.16 – 138.17 Mb
PubMed search
- Wikidata
View/Edit Human	View/Edit Mouse

Mitochondrial E3 ubiquitin protein ligase 1 (MUL1) is an enzyme that in humans is encoded by the MUL1 gene on chromosome 1. This enzyme localizes to the outer mitochondrial membrane, where it regulates mitochondrial morphology and apoptosis through multiple pathways, including the Akt, JNK, and NF-κB. Its proapoptotic function thus implicates it in cancer and Parkinson's disease.

== Structure ==
=== Gene ===
The gene MUL1 encodes one of the E3 ubiquitin ligases. The human gene MUL1 has 5 exons and is located at chromosome band 1p36.12.

=== Protein ===
The human protein Mitochondrial E3 ubiquitin protein ligase 1 is ~40 kDa in size and composed of 352 amino acids. The calculated theoretical pI of this protein is 7.28. MUL1 contains Ring domains at both its N-terminal and C-terminal, which are both exposed to the cytosol. The C-terminal Ring finger domain is homologous to that found in the IAP family members and responsible for its E3 ligase activity. In addition to these Ring domains, MUL1 is predicted to have two mitochondrial transmembrane helices, with the first domain serving as the primary anchor for the rest of the exposed protein. Though it lacks a conserved N-terminal signal peptide or mitochondrial targeting sequence, its transmembrane domains have been observed to influence its trafficking and insertion into the mitochondrial membrane.

== Function ==
Exhibits weak E3 ubiquitin-protein ligase activity. E3 ubiquitin ligases accept ubiquitin from an E2 ubiquitin-conjugating enzyme in the form of a thioester and then directly transfer the ubiquitin to targeted substrates. Can ubiquitinate AKT1 preferentially at 'Lys-284' involving 'Lys-48'-linked polyubiquitination and seems to be involved in regulation of Akt signaling by targeting phosphorylated Akt to proteosomal degradation. Proposed to preferentially act as a SUMO E3 ligase at physiological concentrations. Is anchored in the outer mitochondrial membrane. Plays a role in the control of mitochondrial morphology. Promotes mitochondrial fragmentation and influences mitochondrial localization. The function may implicate its ability to sumoylate DNM1L. Has been observed to shuttle between the mitochondria and peroxisome, where it may also help regulate peroxisome fission. Inhibits cell growth. When overexpressed, activates JNK through MAP3K7/TAK1 and induces caspase-dependent apoptosis. Involved in the modulation of innate immune defense against viruses by inhibiting DDX58-dependent antiviral response. Can mediate DDX58 sumoylation and disrupt its polyubiquitination. Can also activate NF-κB to initiate mitochondria-to-nucleus signaling under stress.

== Clinical significance ==
As aforementioned, MUL1 encodes for an enzyme which is located on outer mitochondrial membrane, where it regulates mitochondrial morphology and apoptosis. Specifically, this enzyme has pro-apoptotic functions.

An apoptotic cell undergoes structural changes including cell shrinkage, plasma membrane blebbing, nuclear condensation, and fragmentation of the DNA and nucleus. This is followed by fragmentation into apoptotic bodies that are quickly removed by phagocytes, thereby preventing an inflammatory response. It is a mode of cell death defined by characteristic morphological, biochemical and molecular changes. It was first described as a "shrinkage necrosis", and then this term was replaced by apoptosis to emphasize its role opposite mitosis in tissue kinetics. In later stages of apoptosis the entire cell becomes fragmented, forming a number of plasma membrane-bounded apoptotic bodies which contain nuclear and or cytoplasmic elements. The ultrastructural appearance of necrosis is quite different, the main features being mitochondrial swelling, plasma membrane breakdown and cellular disintegration. Apoptosis occurs in many physiological and pathological processes. It plays an important role during embryonal development as programmed cell death and accompanies a variety of normal involutional processes in which it serves as a mechanism to remove "unwanted" cells.

Though MUL1 is highly expressed in most human tissues during normal conditions, it is found to be missing in cancer cells derived from lung, liver, colon, and kidney. This observation suggests that the antiapoptotic MUL1 serves as a tumor suppressor and is thus downregulated in cancer cells.

Experiments in Drosophila and mammalian systems reveal that MUL1 binds and ubiquitinylates mitofusin, which then allows it to indirectly regulate the PINK1/parkin pathway. Thus, this protein can rescue the phenotypes of PINK1 or parkin knockout mice display, which elucidates why only subtle dopaminergic neuronal degeneration or mitochondrial morphology changes have been observed. MUL1 is then a promising therapeutic target for treating Parkinson's disease.

Mul1 has also been implicated as a modulator of antiviral signaling. MUL1 is localized to the mitochondria where it interacts with mitochondrial antiviral signaling and catalyzes RIG-I post-translational modifications that inhibit RIG-I-dependent cell signaling. Accordingly, depletion of MUL1 potentiates RIG-I mediated nuclear factor-kappa B (NF-κB) and interferon (IFN) β reporter activity. Moreover, depletion of MUL1 boosts the antiviral response and increased pro inflammatory cytokines following challenge with the RNA mimetic poly I:C and Sendai virus. It is therefore submitted that MUL1 is a novel regulator of the RIG-I-like receptor-dependent antiviral response, that otherwise functions to limit inflammation. In addition, as a regulator of viral-induced interferon production and proinflammatory cytokine induction, MUL1 functions through mitochondrial antiviral signaling proteins to inhibit RIG-1-induced signaling and mediate the cell's antiviral and inflammatory response.

== Interactions ==
MUL1 is known to interact with:

- MUL1,
- DNM1L,
- TAK1, and
- Mitofusin.
