= FIS1 =

Protein-coding gene in the species Homo sapiens

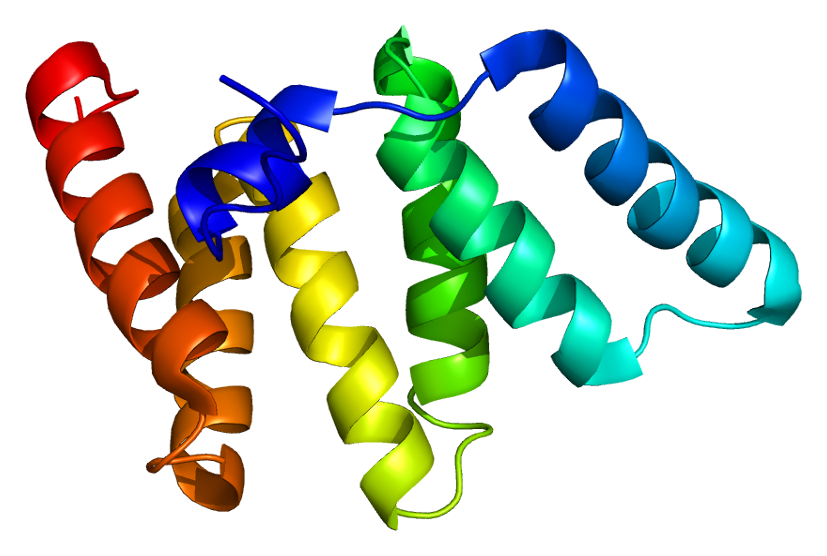

Identifiers
- Aliases: FIS1, TTC11, CGI-135, fission, mitochondrial 1
- External IDs: OMIM: 609003; MGI: 1913687; GeneCards: FIS1
Available structures
| PDB | Ortholog search: PDBe RCSB |
| PDB | List of PDB id codes 1NZN, 1PC2 |

Gene location (Human)
| Chr. | Chromosome 7 (human) |
| Band | 7q22.1 | Start | 101,239,458 bp |
| Band | 7q22.1 | End | 101,252,316 bp |

Gene location (Mouse)
| Chr. | Chromosome 5 (mouse) |
| Band | 5|5 G2 | Start | 136,982,129 bp |
| Band | 5|5 G2 | End | 136,995,088 bp |
RNA expression pattern
| Bgee | Human / Mouse (ortholog); Top expressed in: C1 segment; apex of heart; prefrontal cortex; muscle of thigh; anterior pituitary; gastrocnemius muscle; anterior cingulate cortex; right frontal lobe; right auricle of heart; left ventricle / Top expressed in: interventricular septum; blood; granulocyte; right kidney; dentate gyrus of hippocampal formation granule cell; superior frontal gyrus; visual cortex; lip; primary visual cortex; right lung lobe; More reference expression data |
| BioGPS | n/a |
Gene ontology
| Molecular function | protein binding; signaling receptor binding; protein-containing complex binding |
| Cellular component | integral component of membrane; membrane; peroxisomal membrane; peroxisome; mitochondrial outer membrane; mitochondrion; integral component of peroxisomal membrane; endoplasmic reticulum; integral component of mitochondrial outer membrane; protein-containing complex |
| Biological process | mitochondrial fusion; mitochondrial fission; regulation of mitochondrion organization; positive regulation of cytosolic calcium ion concentration; protein targeting to mitochondrion; peroxisome fission; positive regulation of cysteine-type endopeptidase activity involved in apoptotic process; autophagy of mitochondrion; negative regulation of endoplasmic reticulum calcium ion concentration; positive regulation of mitochondrial calcium ion concentration; mitochondrion morphogenesis; calcium-mediated signaling using intracellular calcium source; positive regulation of intrinsic apoptotic signaling pathway; release of cytochrome c from mitochondria; positive regulation of protein targeting to membrane; apoptotic process; response to muscle activity; cellular response to glucose stimulus; cellular response to toxic substance; response to hypobaric hypoxia; positive regulation of neuron apoptotic process; mitochondrial fragmentation involved in apoptotic process; protein homooligomerization; cellular response to lipid; positive regulation of mitochondrial fission; cellular response to peptide; response to flavonoid; response to nutrient levels; response to fluoride |
Sources:Amigo / QuickGO
Orthologs
| Databases | NCBI: entry; OMA: entry |
| Species | Human | Mouse |
| Entrez | 51024 | 66437 |
| Ensembl | ENSG00000214253 | ENSMUSG00000019054 |
| UniProt | Q9Y3D6 | Q9CQ92 |
| RefSeq (mRNA) | NM_016068 | NM_001163243; NM_025562; NM_001347504 |
| RefSeq (protein) | NP_057152 | NP_001156715; NP_001334433; NP_079838 |
| Location (UCSC) | Chr 7: 101.24 – 101.25 Mb | Chr 5: 136.98 – 137 Mb |
| PubMed search |
- Wikidata
| View/Edit Human | View/Edit Mouse |

Mitochondrial fission 1 protein (FIS1) is a protein that in humans is encoded by the FIS1 gene on chromosome 7. This protein is a component of a mitochondrial complex, the ARCosome, that promotes mitochondrial fission. Its role in mitochondrial fission thus implicates it in the regulation of mitochondrial morphology, the cell cycle, and apoptosis. By extension, the protein is involved in associated diseases, including neurodegenerative diseases and cancers.

== Structure ==
The protein encoded by this gene is a 16 kDa integral protein situated in the outer mitochondrial membrane (OMM). It is composed of a transmembrane domain at the C-terminal and a cytosolic domain at the N-terminal. The transmembrane domain anchors FIS1 in the OMM, though it has been observed to target different cellular compartments, such as the peroxisome, depending on its hydrophobicity, charge, and length. Meanwhile, the cytosolic domain contains a bundle of six helices, four of which contain two tandem tetratricopeptide repeat (TPR)-like motifs. These motifs form a concave surface by their combined superhelical structure and potentially bind another FIS1 protein to form a dimer, or other proteins. Moreover, the N-terminal arm can dock at, and thus obstruct, the TPR motifs, allowing the protein to exist in a dynamic equilibrium between "open" and "closed" states.

== Function ==
FIS1 is indirectly involved in mitochondrial fission via binding dynamin-related protein 1 (DRP1). By extension, FIS1 helps regulate the size and distribution of mitochondria in response to local demand for ATP or calcium ions. In addition, mitochondrial fission may lead to release of cytochrome C, which eventually leads to cell death. In a separate apoptotic signalling pathway, FIS1 interacts with BCAP31 to form a complex, the ARCosome. The ARCosome promotes cell death by bridging the mitochondria and the endoplasmic reticulum (ER), allowing FIS1 to transmit a proapoptotic signal from the mitochondria to the ER and activate procaspase-8. The ARCosome then forms a platform with procaspase-8 to increase calcium load in the mitochondria, resulting in apoptosis. Additionally, FIS1 is involved in other modes of shaping mitochondrial morphology. For example, it interacts with TBC1D15 to regulate mitochondrial morphology, particularly with regard to lysosome and endosome fusion. FIS1 also prevents mitochondria elongation, which would otherwise lead to cell cycle delay or arrest, and ultimately, senescence. Moreover, mitochondrial dysfunction results in elevated reactive oxygen species (ROS) levels, which cause DNA damage and induce transcriptional repression, as well as induce mitophagy.

== Clinical Significance ==
As a fission factor, FIS1 is associated with neurodegenerative diseases. Stress, such as NO, can trigger aberrant mitochondrial fission and fusion, resulting in mitophagy. For example, increased mitochondrial fragmentation and FIS1 levels were observed in Alzheimer's disease (AD) patients. Thus, FIS1 could serve as a biomarker for early detection of AD. FIS1 is also implicated in a variety of cancers, including acute myeloid leukemia, breast cancer, and prostate cancer.

== Interactions ==
FIS1 has been shown to interact with:

- BCAP31,
- procaspase-8,
- TBC1D15,
- PEX11 family, and
- DNM1L.
