= Mitochondrial dynamics protein MID49 =

Protein-coding gene in the species Homo sapiens

MIEF2

Identifiers
- Aliases: MIEF2, SMCR7, mitochondrial elongation factor 2, MID49, COXPD49
- External IDs: OMIM: 615498; MGI: 2144199; GeneCards: MIEF2
Available structures
PDB	Ortholog search: PDBe RCSB
PDB	List of PDB id codes 4WOY

Gene location (Human)
Chr.	Chromosome 17 (human)
Band	17p11.2	Start	18,260,597 bp
Band	17p11.2	End	18,266,552 bp

Gene location (Mouse)
Chr.	Chromosome 11 (mouse)
Band	11|11 B2	Start	60,619,224 bp
Band	11|11 B2	End	60,623,777 bp
RNA expression pattern
Bgee	Human / Mouse (ortholog); Top expressed in: muscle of thigh; apex of heart; gastrocnemius muscle; left ventricle; skeletal muscle tissue; gonad; prefrontal cortex; human kidney; left adrenal gland; right adrenal gland / Top expressed in: knee joint; muscle of thigh; skeletal muscle tissue; quadriceps femoris muscle; gastrocnemius muscle; tibialis anterior muscle; ankle; temporal muscle; sternocleidomastoid muscle; medial head of gastrocnemius muscle; More reference expression data
BioGPS	n/a
Gene ontology
Molecular function	protein binding; identical protein binding
Cellular component	integral component of membrane; mitochondrial outer membrane; peroxisome; membrane; mitochondrion
Biological process	mitochondrial fusion; positive regulation of protein homooligomerization; mitochondrion organization; positive regulation of mitochondrial fission; positive regulation of protein targeting to membrane; regulation of mitochondrion organization
Sources:Amigo / QuickGO
Orthologs
Databases	NCBI: entry; OMA: entry
Species	Human	Mouse
Entrez	125170	237781
Ensembl	ENSG00000284495; ENSG00000177427	ENSMUSG00000018599
UniProt	Q96C03	Q5NCS9
RefSeq (mRNA)	NM_148886; NM_001144900; NM_139162	NM_001009927
RefSeq (protein)	NP_001138372; NP_631901; NP_683684	NP_001009927
Location (UCSC)	Chr 17: 18.26 – 18.27 Mb	Chr 11: 60.62 – 60.62 Mb
PubMed search
- Wikidata
View/Edit Human	View/Edit Mouse

Mitochondrial dynamics protein MID49 is a protein that in humans is encoded by the MIEF2 gene (from "Mitochondrial elongation factor 2").

== Gene ==
Alternative splicing results in multiple transcript variants encoding different isoforms. [provided by RefSeq, Jun 2011].

The gene is located within the Smith-Magenis syndrome region on chromosome 17.

== Structure ==
The MID49 protein is a dynamic peripheral protein receptor found on the surface of the mitochondrial membrane. MID51 is a very similar protein and studies have shown that it has a variant nucleotidyl transferase structure which allows it to move phosphates as a co-factor. This structure and ability is essential because it allows it to interact with ADP which will activate the Drp1 protein. Further studies have shown that MID49 and MID51 are homologous in sequence and MID49 also has a nucleotidyl transferase domain but it is still unknown if MID49 can also bind a co-factor. Instead of a co-factor ligand, it was found that MID49 has a loop structure on its surface that allows it to physically interact with the Drp1 protein. To recap, the MID51 and MID49 are both similar proteins that recruit Drp1 protein to induce mitochondrial binary fission but they have small differences in structure which allows them to bind Drp1 in different ways.

== Function ==
This gene encodes an outer mitochondrial membrane protein that functions in the regulation of mitochondrial morphology. It can directly recruit the fission mediator dynamin-related protein 1 (Drp1) to the mitochondrial surface.

The MID49 protein is used to assist in mitochondrial binary fission.

The MID49 peripheral protein will attract the Drp1 to the surface of the mitochondrial membrane which then induces endoplasmic reticulum contact. The ER then releases Ca2+ into the mitochondria once there is physical contact at the membrane. The influx of calcium induces a constriction response in the mitochondria. With this constriction in the middle, the MID49 keeps recruiting more and more Drp1 proteins to make a sort of chain structure to wrap around that narrowed area called the oligomeric ring. The Drp1 proteins will eventually disassociate with the MID49 proteins through hydrolysis which causes a much tighter constriction around the mitochondria. There are still studies being done to confirm if this constriction alone will then split the mitochondria in the middle to complete a binary fission event.

== See also ==
- MIEF1
