= Kjer =

Kjer may refer to:

In people:

- Bodil Kjer (1917–2003), Danish actress
- Eva Kjer Hansen (born 1964), Danish politician
- Karl Kjer (born 1959), American entomologist
- Paul Kjer, Danish ophthalmologist who first described the condition now known as Kjer's optic neuropathy

In other uses:

- Kjer Glacier, glacier in Greenland
- Kjer's optic neuropathy, dominant optic atrophy
