= Mitochondrial fusion promoter M1 =

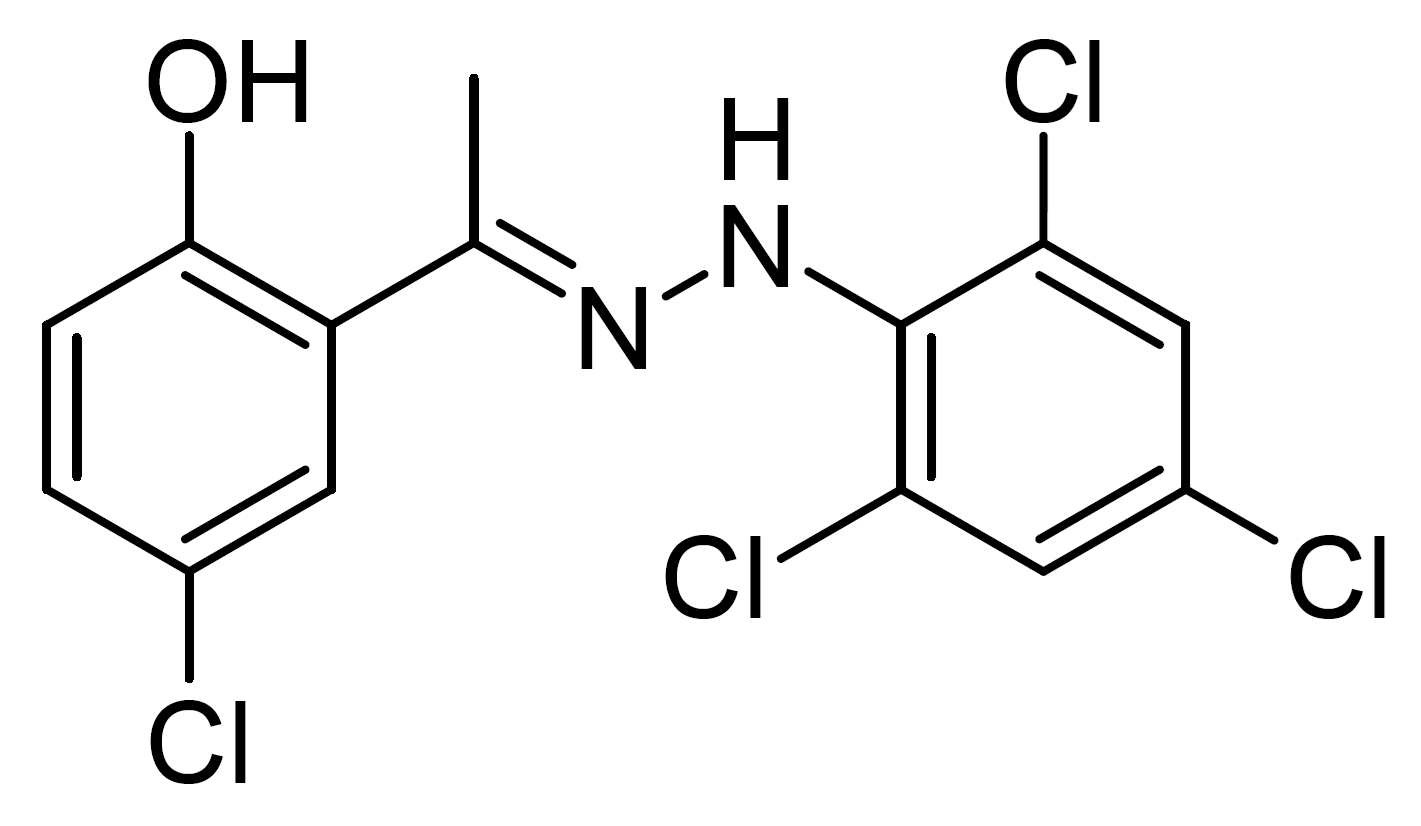

Identifiers
- IUPAC name: 4-chloro-2-[(Z)-C-methyl-N-(2,4,6-trichloroanilino)carbonimidoyl]phenol
- CAS Number: 219315-22-7
- PubChem CID: 136672588
- ChemSpider: 67178457
- CompTox Dashboard (EPA): DTXSID70893486

Chemical and physical data
- Formula: C_{14}H_{10}Cl_{4}N_{2}O
- Molar mass: 364.05 g·mol^{−1}
- 3D model (JSmol): Interactive image
- SMILES: C/C(=N/NC1=C(C=C(C=C1Cl)Cl)Cl)/C2=C(C=CC(=C2)Cl)O
- InChI: InChI=1S/C14H10Cl4N2O/c1-7(10-4-8(15)2-3-13(10)21)19-20-14-11(17)5-9(16)6-12(14)18/h2-6,20-21H,1H3/b19-7-; Key:CYVDGZYJHHYIIU-GXHLCREISA-N

Mitochondrial fusion promoter M1 (M1) is an experimental drug which acts as a promoter of mitochondrial fusion. In animal studies it was found to promote optic nerve regeneration following injury.
