= FATE1 =

Protein-coding gene in the species Homo sapiens

Identifiers
- Aliases: FATE1, CT43, FATE, fetal and adult testis expressed 1
- External IDs: OMIM: 300450; GeneCards: FATE1

Gene location (Human)
| Chr. | X chromosome (human) |
| Band | Xq28 | Start | 151,716,035 bp |
| Band | Xq28 | End | 151,723,194 bp |
RNA expression pattern
| Bgee | Human / Mouse (ortholog); Top expressed in: right testis; left testis; testicle; gonad; apex of heart; deltoid muscle; upper respiratory tract; duodenum; cingulate gyrus; anterior cingulate cortex / n/a; More reference expression data |
| BioGPS | n/a |
Gene ontology
| Molecular function | protein binding; ubiquitin protein ligase binding |
| Cellular component | integral component of membrane; membrane; mitochondria associated membranes; mitochondrion; mitochondrial outer membrane; endoplasmic reticulum; endoplasmic reticulum membrane |
| Biological process | negative regulation of apoptotic process; negative regulation of mitochondrial calcium ion concentration; apoptotic process; regulation of apoptotic process |
Sources:Amigo / QuickGO
Orthologs
| Databases | NCBI: entry; OMA: entry |
| Species | Human | Mouse |
| Entrez | 89885 | n/a |
| Ensembl | ENSG00000147378 | n/a |
| UniProt | Q969F0 | n/a |
| RefSeq (mRNA) | NM_033085 | n/a |
| RefSeq (protein) | NP_149076 | n/a |
| Location (UCSC) | Chr X: 151.72 – 151.72 Mb | n/a |
| PubMed search | | n/a |
- Wikidata
| View/Edit Human |

Fetal and Adult Testis-Expressed 1, encoded by the FATE1 gene in humans, is a protein identified as a cancer-testis antigen (CTA) in hepatocellular carcinomas and gastric and colon cancers. It is testis-specific in the fetus (aged 6 – 11 weeks). In adults, it is expressed predominantly in the testis and adrenal glands, with some expression in the lungs, heart, kidneys and throughout the brain.

FATE1 is member of the Miff protein family, with its C-terminal domain, consisting of a transmembrane domain with a coiled-coil domain, showing high similarity to the mitochondrial fission factor (MFF) protein which is involved in mitochondrial and peroxisomal fission.

== Gene location ==
FATE1 gene in humans is located on the long arm of the X chromosome at region 28, from base pair 150,884,502 to base pair 150,891,617.

== Mechanism ==
It has been hypothesized that FATE1 uses its C-terminal transmembrane domain to attach to endoplasmic reticulum (ER) membrane and with its C-terminal coiled-coil domain it interacts with mitochondria.

FATE1 is localized in mitochondria-associated ER membranes (MAM) and modulates ER-mitochondria distance to regulate Ca^{2+}- and drug dependent apoptosis in cancer cells.

FATE1 expression leads to reduction of Ca^{2+} uptake by mitochondria and therefore decrease in fragmentation of mitochondria, associated with mitochondrial Ca^{2+} uptake, consequently providing protection against cell death.

== Relation to cancer ==
FATE1 is detectable in all cell lines derived from tumors, but is low or undetectable in telomere immortalized, non-tumorigenic fibroblasts and lung epithelial cells. FATE1 is suggested to be essential for survival of tumor cells as depletion of FATE1 results in viability reduction in melanoma, breast, prostate and sarcoma settings.

Upregulation of FATE1 by a transcription factor steroidogenic factor-1 (SF-1), involved in adrenal and gonadal development as well as in adrenocortical carcinoma, increases ER-mitochondria distance and is utilized by cancer cell to functionally uncouple ER and mitochondria.

Silencing FATE1 gene sensitizes non-small-cell lung cancer cell lines to paclitaxel, a chemotherapeutic drug against many different types of cancers.

Elevated level of FATE1 is found to be associated with higher mortality rate in colorectal cancers, but in non-small-cell lung cancers, elevation of FATE1 alone did not decrease chance of survival, but decreased if RNF183 expression is also increased.
