= RFFL =

Protein-coding gene in the species Homo sapiens

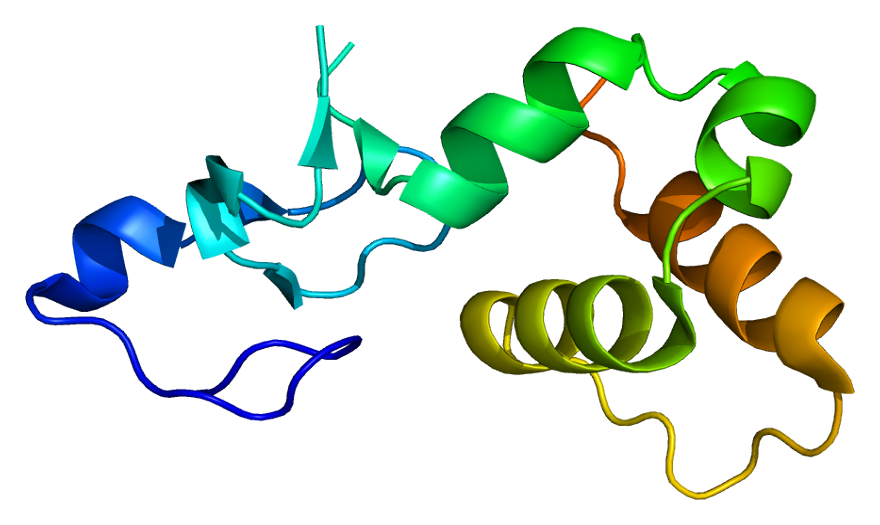

Identifiers
- Aliases: RFFL, CARP-2, CARP2, FRING, RIFIFYLIN, RNF189, RNF34L, ring finger and FYVE-like domain containing E3 ubiquitin protein ligase, ring finger and FYVE like domain containing E3 ubiquitin protein ligase
- External IDs: OMIM: 609735; MGI: 1914588; GeneCards: RFFL
Available structures
PDB	Ortholog search: PDBe RCSB
PDB	List of PDB id codes 1Y02
Enzyme activity
EC #	BRENDA	ExPASy	KEGG	MetaCyc
2.3.2.27	↗	↗	↗	↗

Gene location (Human)
Chr.	Chromosome 17 (human)
Band	17q12	Start	35,005,990 bp
Band	17q12	End	35,089,319 bp

Gene location (Mouse)
Chr.	Chromosome 11 (mouse)
Band	11|11 C	Start	82,693,275 bp
Band	11|11 C	End	82,762,036 bp
RNA expression pattern
Bgee	Human / Mouse (ortholog); Top expressed in: inferior ganglion of vagus nerve; secondary oocyte; pancreatic epithelial cell; buccal mucosa cell; corpus callosum; mucosa of ileum; spinal cord; amniotic fluid; subthalamic nucleus; C1 segment / Top expressed in: granulocyte; olfactory epithelium; zygote; secondary oocyte; lacrimal gland; seminiferous tubule; spermatid; blood; epithelium of stomach; primary oocyte; More reference expression data
BioGPS	n/a
Gene ontology
Molecular function	p53 binding; metal ion binding; protease binding; protein binding; protein kinase binding; ubiquitin protein ligase binding; ubiquitin protein ligase activity; transferase activity
Cellular component	cytoplasm; cytosol; endosome; membrane; plasma membrane; Golgi membrane; tumor necrosis factor receptor superfamily complex; recycling endosome membrane; lysosome; endosome membrane; nucleoplasm
Biological process	regulation of TOR signaling; ubiquitin-dependent protein catabolic process; negative regulation of tumor necrosis factor-mediated signaling pathway; protein K48-linked ubiquitination; negative regulation of cysteine-type endopeptidase activity involved in execution phase of apoptosis; negative regulation of extrinsic apoptotic signaling pathway via death domain receptors; protein ubiquitination; negative regulation of signal transduction by p53 class mediator; regulation of fibroblast migration; proteasome-mediated ubiquitin-dependent protein catabolic process; apoptotic process
Sources:Amigo / QuickGO
Orthologs
Databases	NCBI: entry; OMA: entry
Species	Human	Mouse
Entrez	117584	67338
Ensembl	ENSG00000092871	ENSMUSG00000020696
UniProt	Q8WZ73	Q6ZQM0
RefSeq (mRNA)	NM_001017368; NM_057178	NM_001007465; NM_001164569; NM_001164570; NM_001164571; NM_026097
RefSeq (protein)	NP_001017368	NP_001007466; NP_001158041; NP_001158042; NP_001158043; NP_080373
Location (UCSC)	Chr 17: 35.01 – 35.09 Mb	Chr 11: 82.69 – 82.76 Mb
PubMed search
- Wikidata
View/Edit Human	View/Edit Mouse

E3 ubiquitin-protein ligase RFFL (Ring Finger And FYVE Like Domain Containing E3 Ubiquitin) is a ubiquitin ligase enzyme that in humans is encoded by the RFFL gene. RFFL associates with endosomes. RFFL is known to affect cardiac repolarization, Cystic fibrosis transmembrane conductance regulator (CFTR) ubiquitination, and mitochondrial clearance by affecting Parkin/PRKN recruitment, and the regulation of mitochondrial morphology through the ubiquitination of mitofusin proteins. Proteomic studies suggest broader roles for RFFL, such as roles in lipid metabolism. Currently, only FYVE domain of RFFL strcuture is solved.

== Interactors ==
- ATXN3
- MDM2
- OPTN
- Parkin
- RAB10
- RNF34
- STUB1
- VCP
- MFN2

== See also ==
- FYVE domain
- RING finger domain
