= Mitochondrial fission factor =

Protein-coding gene in the species Homo sapiens

MFF

Identifiers
- Aliases: MFF, C2orf33, GL004, mitochondrial fission factor, EMPF2
- External IDs: OMIM: 614785; MGI: 1922984; GeneCards: MFF

Gene location (Human)
Chr.	Chromosome 2 (human)
Band	2q36.3	Start	227,325,151 bp
Band	2q36.3	End	227,357,836 bp

Gene location (Mouse)
Chr.	Chromosome 1 (mouse)
Band	1|1 C5	Start	82,702,611 bp
Band	1|1 C5	End	82,730,115 bp
RNA expression pattern
Bgee	Human / Mouse (ortholog); Top expressed in: sperm; left testis; right testis; gonad; ganglionic eminence; C1 segment; body of pancreas; Brodmann area 9; anterior cingulate cortex; prefrontal cortex / Top expressed in: Epithelium of choroid plexus; barrel cortex; medullary collecting duct; iris; substantia nigra; medial ganglionic eminence; ventral tegmental area; retinal pigment epithelium; medial vestibular nucleus; renal corpuscle; More reference expression data
BioGPS	n/a
Gene ontology
Molecular function	protein homodimerization activity; protein binding
Cellular component	integral component of membrane; membrane; synaptic vesicle; peroxisome; synapse; mitochondrial outer membrane; cell junction; integral component of mitochondrial membrane; cytoplasmic vesicle; mitochondrion
Biological process	mitochondrial fusion; mitochondrial fragmentation involved in apoptotic process; positive regulation of mitochondrial fission; mitochondrial fission; regulation of mitochondrion organization; regulation of peroxisome organization; protein targeting to mitochondrion; peroxisome fission; positive regulation of release of cytochrome c from mitochondria; mitochondrion morphogenesis; protein homooligomerization; release of cytochrome c from mitochondria; positive regulation of protein targeting to membrane
Sources:Amigo / QuickGO
Orthologs
Databases	NCBI: entry; OMA: entry
Species	Human	Mouse
Entrez	56947	75734
Ensembl	ENSG00000168958	ENSMUSG00000026150
UniProt	Q9GZY8	Q6PCP5
RefSeq (mRNA)	NM_001277061; NM_001277062; NM_001277063; NM_001277064; NM_001277065 NM_001277066; NM_001277067; NM_001277068; NM_020194	NM_029409; NM_001310695; NM_001310697; NM_001310699; NM_001372405 NM_001372406; NM_001372407; NM_001372408; NM_001372409; NM_001372411; NM_001372412; NM_001372413; NM_001372414
RefSeq (protein)	NP_001263990; NP_001263991; NP_001263992; NP_001263993; NP_001263994 NP_001263995; NP_001263996; NP_001263997; NP_064579	NP_001297624; NP_001297626; NP_001297628; NP_083685; NP_001359334 NP_001359335; NP_001359336; NP_001359337; NP_001359338; NP_001359340; NP_001359341; NP_001359342; NP_001359343
Location (UCSC)	Chr 2: 227.33 – 227.36 Mb	Chr 1: 82.7 – 82.73 Mb
PubMed search
- Wikidata
View/Edit Human	View/Edit Mouse

Mitochondrial fission factor (Mff) is a protein that in humans is encoded by the MFF gene. Its primary role is in controlling the division of mitochondria. Mitochondrial morphology changes by continuous fission in order to create interconnected network of mitochondria. This activity is crucial for normal function of mitochondria. Mff is anchored to the mitochondrial outer membrane through the C-terminal transmembrane domain, extruding the bulk of the N-terminal portion containing two short amino acid repeats in the N-terminal half and a coiled-coil domain just upstream of the transmembrane domain into the cytosol. It has also been shown to regulate peroxisome morphology.

== Role in mitochondrial fission ==
Mff is an outer mitochondrial membrane protein that binds to the GTPase Drp1; the Mff-Drp1 complex is what promotes mitochondrial fission. Knockdown of Mff causes the mitochondrial network to expand (by releasing the Drp1 foci from the outer mitochondrial membrane), while Mff overexpression causes it to become fragmented (by stimulating mitochondrial recruitment of Drp1). DRP1 is mainly cytosolic, but translocate to the mitochondrial surface in order to mediate fission of mitochondria. Mitochondrial fission factor plays a crucial role in engaging Drp1 to the outer mitochondrial membrane in order to direct mitochondrial fission. Mff overexpression leads to various defective conditions in humans such as neurogenerative disorders like Huntington’s disease, Alzheimer’s disease, metabolic disorders, cardiovascular disease and majorly cancer. re-fusing mitochondria may be a viable therapeutic strategy in diseases with excessive mitochondrial fission.
