= Poul Kjer =

Danish ophthalmologist

Paul Kjer is a Danish ophthalmologist who studied a condition in nineteen families that was characterized by infantile optic atrophy along with a dominant inheritance mode. In 1959, the condition was named Kjer's optic neuropathy in his honor.

== Partial bibliography ==
- Kjer, P. (1959). "Infantile optic atrophy with dominant mode of inheritance; A clinical and genetic study of 19 Danish families". [Tr. from the Danish]. Acta ophthalmologica, 54. Copenhagen: Munksgaard. OCLC 13752952
- Thiselton, Dawn L, Christiane Alexander, Alex Morris, Simon Brooks, Thomas Rosenberg, Hans Eiberg, Birgit Kjer, Poul Kjer, Shomi S Bhattacharya, and Marcela Votruba. 2001. "A Frameshift Mutation in Exon28 of the OPA1 Gene Explains the High Prevalence of Dominant Optic Atrophy in the Danish Population: Evidence for a Founder Effect". Human Genetics. 109, no. 5: 498.
