= Kjer's optic neuropathy =

- Other names: Autosomal dominant optic atrophy, Kjer type; Kjer optic atrophy; or, Kjer's autosomal dominant optic atrophy.
- Specialty: Neurology

Dominant optic atrophy (DOA), or autosomal dominant optic atrophy (ADOA), (Kjer's type) is an autosomally inherited disease that affects the optic nerves, causing reduced visual acuity and blindness beginning in childhood. However, the disease can seem to re-present a second time with further vision loss due to the early onset of presbyopia symptoms (i.e., difficulty in viewing objects up close). DOA is characterized as affecting neurons called retinal ganglion cells (RGCs). This condition is due to mitochondrial dysfunction mediating the death of optic nerve fibers. The RGCs axons form the optic nerve. Therefore, the disease can be considered of the central nervous system. Dominant optic atrophy was first described clinically by Batten in 1896 and named Kjer's optic neuropathy in 1959 after Danish ophthalmologist Poul Kjer, who studied 19 families with the disease. Although dominant optic atrophy is the most common autosomally inherited optic neuropathy (i.e., disease of the optic nerves), it is often misdiagnosed.

== Presentation ==
Autosomal dominant optic atrophy can present clinically as an isolated bilateral optic neuropathy (non-syndromic form) or rather as a complicated phenotype with extra-ocular signs (syndromic form). Dominant optic atrophy usually affects both eyes roughly symmetrically in a slowly progressive pattern of vision loss beginning in childhood and is hence a contributor to childhood blindness.

A Humphrey Visual Field (HVF) can detect where areas of impaired vision have occurred, which usually shows up as central, centrocaecal, or paracentral scotomas for DOA patients. Another visual test—optical coherence tomography (OCT) analyzes the optic nerve head—shows other structural consequences of the disease as retinal nerve fiber layer (RNFL) and ganglion cell layer thinning. Photographs of the fundus shows the typical optic atrophy worse on the temporal side of the optic disc in the shape of a wedge. Cupping of the optic disc was found in 89% of DOA patients in at least one of their eyes.

With loss of the central visual fields, there is impairment of color vision in addition to loss of visual acuity varying from mild to severe, typically ranging from 6/6 (in meters, equivalent to 20/20, ft) to 6/60 (20/200, ft) with a median value of 6/36 (roughly equivalent to 20/125 ft), corrected vision. Vision loss may sometimes be more severe.

Characteristic changes of the fundus (eye) evident on examination includes optic atrophy. In some cases, this may include optic disc cupping similar in appearance to glaucoma of the optic disc. Because the onset of Dominant optic atrophy is insidious, symptoms are often not noticed by the patients in its early stages and are picked up by chance in routine school eye screenings. The first signs of DOA typically present between 6–10 years of age, though presentation at as early as 1 year of age has been reported. In some cases, Dominant optic atrophy may remain subclinical until early adulthood. While symptoms typically begin to present in childhood, adult patients (around the age of 35) commonly complain of new onset loss of vision at near.

The emergence of premature presbyopia occurs from DOA patients being accustomed to holding objects closer to their faces to read. As a result, Donder's curve should not be used to prescribe them lenses to correct premature presbyopia. Instead of calculating based on individuals reading from about 16 inches from the face, DOA patients should be calculated at around 8 inches due to their shortened reading distance.

Progression of dominant optic atrophy varies even within the same family. Some have mild cases with visual acuity stabilizing in adolescence, others have slowly but constantly progressing cases, and others still have sudden step-like decreases in visual acuity. Generally, the severity of the condition by adolescence reflects the overall level of visual function to be expected throughout most of the patient's adult life (Votruba, 1998). Slow decline in acuity is known to occur in late middle age in some families.

In complicated cases of autosomal dominant optic atrophy, in addition to bilateral optic neuropathy, several other neurological signs of neurological involvement can rarely be observed: peripheral neuropathy, deafness, cerebellar ataxia, spastic paraparesis, myopathy.

== Genetics ==
Dominant optic atrophy is inherited in an autosomal dominant manner. That is, a heterozygous patient with the disease has a 50% chance of passing on the disease to each offspring, assuming his/her partner does not have the disease. Males and females are affected at the same rate. Although DOA has a high penetrance (98%), severity and progression of DOA are extremely variable even within the same family.

== Pathophysiology ==
Vision loss in dominant optic atrophy is due to optic nerve fiber loss from mitochondria dysfunction. Dominant optic atrophy is associated with mutation of the OPA1 gene found on chromosome 3, region q28-qter. Also, 5 other chromosomal genes are described as causing optic atrophy: OPA2 (x-linked), OPA3 (dominant), OPA4 (dominant), OPA5 (dominant) and OPA6 (recessive) (see OMIM 165500).

The OPA1 gene codes for a dynamin-related GTPase protein targeted to the mitochondrial inner membrane. OPA1 has distinct roles in the fusion of mitochondrial inner membranes during mitochondrial fusion events, and in regulation of cell death.

Mitochondria are subcellular structures that generate and transform energy from metabolism into discrete usable units (ATP) for the cell's functions (See oxidative phosphorylation, electron transport chain). Retinal ganglion cells (neurons) make up the optic nerve and have a long unmyelinated portion, hence the high energy demand and sensitivity to mitochondrial dysfunction. This is especially the case for smaller axons such as those found in the papillomacular bundle of the retina, which transmit information corresponding to the central visual field. The surface ratios of these smaller axons make them even more vulnerable to mitochondrial impairments. Biochemical and mitochondrial morphological studies on cells from patients affected by autosomal dominant optic atrophy have shown a severe defect in the shape (with a very remarkable fragmentation of the mitochondrial tubules in small spheres) and distribution of mitochondria, occurring independently from a bioenergetic defect (respiratory chain function, ATP synthesis, and reactive oxygen species production) or apoptosis, indicating that the mitochondrial fusion defect is the primary pathogenetic mechanism, although variable bioenergetic defects can also occur as a secondary phenomenon, especially in severe cases with complicated phenotypes and accumulation of multiple mitochondrial-DNA deletions.

Over 200 different mutations of the OPA1 gene causing DOA have been reported, most of which occur in the catalytic domain of the protein.

Mutations at the OPA1 gene are also associated with normal tension glaucoma (OMIM 606657) and deafness (OMIM 125250).

== Management ==
Currently, there are no curative therapies available for dominant optic atrophy. Some studies have found usage of idebenone to be associated with mild improvement in visual acuity for DOA patients with OPA1 mutation. Idebenone works as an antioxidant by shuttling electrons affected by reduced ATP synthesis and defective oxidative phosphorylation in complex I directly to complex III. Typically, idebenone is prescribed to be taken three times a day.

Patients should be monitored for changes in vision by their eye-care professional. Children of patients should be screened regularly for visual changes related to dominant optic atrophy. Research is underway to further characterize the disease so that therapies may be developed.

Since November 2018, Cure ADOA Foundation has been focusing on fellow patients and their families. They have the following goals: scientific research, disease awareness, interaction between all parties involved and a trustworthy place for the patients.

== Incidence ==
The incidence of dominant optic atrophy has been estimated to be 1:50,000 with prevalence as high as 1:10,000 in the Danish population (Votruba, 1998).

== See also ==
- Optic atrophy
