= TBC1D15 =

Protein-coding gene in humans

Identifiers
- Aliases: TBC1D15, RAB7-GAP, TBC1 domain family member 15
- External IDs: OMIM: 612662; MGI: 1913937; GeneCards: TBC1D15

Gene location (Human)
Chr.	Chromosome 12 (human)
Band	12q21.1	Start	71,839,707 bp
Band	12q21.1	End	71,927,248 bp

Gene location (Mouse)
Chr.	Chromosome 10 (mouse)
Band	10|10 D2	Start	115,033,777 bp
Band	10|10 D2	End	115,087,372 bp
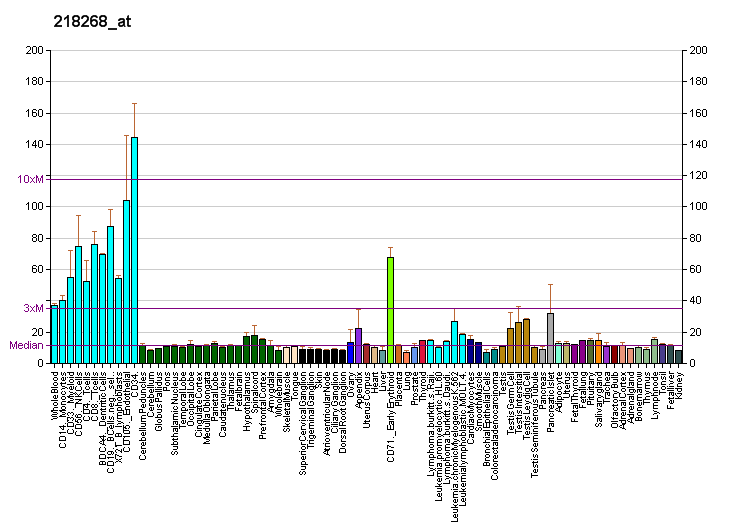
RNA expression pattern
Bgee	Human / Mouse (ortholog); Top expressed in: Achilles tendon; body of pancreas; right lung; gastrocnemius muscle; ventricular zone; pericardium; tibial nerve; monocyte; subcutaneous adipose tissue; gallbladder / Top expressed in: secondary oocyte; zygote; primary oocyte; lacrimal gland; seminal vesicula; parotid gland; transitional epithelium of urinary bladder; endothelial cell of lymphatic vessel; egg cell; Paneth cell; More reference expression data
BioGPS	More reference expression data
Gene ontology
Molecular function	protein binding; GTPase activator activity
Cellular component	cytoplasm; extracellular region; endomembrane system; intracellular anatomical structure
Biological process	regulation of GTPase activity; regulation of cilium assembly; activation of GTPase activity; intracellular protein transport; regulation of vesicle fusion
Sources:Amigo / QuickGO
Orthologs
Databases	NCBI: entry; OMA: entry
Species	Human	Mouse
Entrez	64786	66687
Ensembl	ENSG00000121749	ENSMUSG00000020130
UniProt	Q8TC07	Q9CXF4
RefSeq (mRNA)	NM_001146213; NM_001146214; NM_022771	NM_025706
RefSeq (protein)	NP_001139685; NP_001139686; NP_073608	NP_079982
Location (UCSC)	Chr 12: 71.84 – 71.93 Mb	Chr 10: 115.03 – 115.09 Mb
PubMed search
- Wikidata
View/Edit Human	View/Edit Mouse

TBC1 domain family member 15 is a protein that in humans is encoded by the TBC1D15 gene.
