= BCAP31 =

Protein-coding gene in humans

Available structures
PDB	Ortholog search: PDBe RCSB
PDB	List of PDB id codes 4JZL, 4JZP

Identifiers
- Aliases: BCAP31, 6C6-AG, BAP31, CDM, DDCH, DXS1357E, B-cell receptor-associated protein 31, B-cell receptor associated protein 31, B cell receptor associated protein 31
- External IDs: OMIM: 300398; MGI: 1350933; HomoloGene: 38095; GeneCards: BCAP31; OMA:BCAP31 - orthologs

Gene location (Human)
Chr.	X chromosome (human)
Band	Xq28	Start	153,700,492 bp
Band	Xq28	End	153,724,565 bp

Gene location (Mouse)
Chr.	X chromosome (mouse)
Band	X|X A7.3	Start	72,729,784 bp
Band	X|X A7.3	End	72,759,781 bp
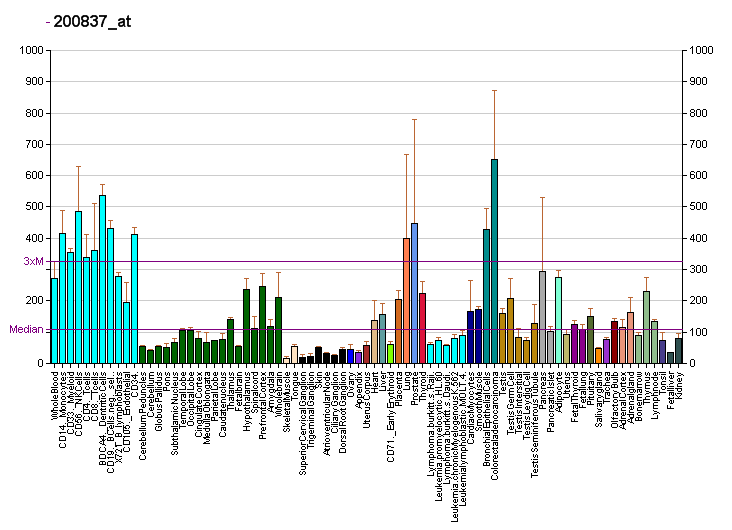
RNA expression pattern
Bgee	Human / Mouse (ortholog); Top expressed in: left adrenal gland; right adrenal gland; right adrenal cortex; left adrenal cortex; mucosa of transverse colon; stromal cell of endometrium; skin of leg; skin of abdomen; Brodmann area 10; islet of Langerhans / Top expressed in: Paneth cell; facial motor nucleus; gastrula; decidua; subcutaneous adipose tissue; medullary collecting duct; fossa; external carotid artery; condyle; tunica adventitia of aorta; More reference expression data
BioGPS	More reference expression data
Gene ontology
Molecular function	protein-containing complex binding; protein binding; MHC class I protein binding
Cellular component	integral component of membrane; cytosol; endoplasmic reticulum membrane; membrane; Sec61; Golgi membrane; lipid droplet; perinuclear endoplasmic reticulum; integral component of plasma membrane; Golgi cisterna membrane; endoplasmic reticulum; integral component of lumenal side of endoplasmic reticulum membrane; endoplasmic reticulum-Golgi intermediate compartment membrane; clathrin-coated vesicle; mitochondrion
Biological process	antigen processing and presentation of peptide antigen via MHC class I; positive regulation of cytosolic calcium ion concentration; positive regulation of retrograde protein transport, ER to cytosol; positive regulation of ER-associated ubiquitin-dependent protein catabolic process; positive regulation of cysteine-type endopeptidase activity involved in apoptotic process; spermatogenesis; protein transport; negative regulation of endoplasmic reticulum calcium ion concentration; positive regulation of mitochondrial calcium ion concentration; intracellular protein transport; calcium-mediated signaling using intracellular calcium source; positive regulation of intrinsic apoptotic signaling pathway; vesicle-mediated transport; apoptotic process; endoplasmic reticulum to Golgi vesicle-mediated transport; protein localization to endoplasmic reticulum exit site; execution phase of apoptosis; transport; viral process
Sources:Amigo / QuickGO
Orthologs
Species	Human	Mouse
Entrez	10134	27061
Ensembl	ENSG00000185825	ENSMUSG00000002015
UniProt	P51572	Q61335
RefSeq (mRNA)	NM_005745; NM_001139441; NM_001139457; NM_001256447	NM_012060; NM_001313698
RefSeq (protein)	NP_001132913; NP_001132929; NP_001243376; NP_005736	NP_001300627; NP_036190
Location (UCSC)	Chr X: 153.7 – 153.72 Mb	Chr X: 72.73 – 72.76 Mb
PubMed search
- Wikidata
View/Edit Human	View/Edit Mouse

B-cell receptor-associated protein 31 is a protein that in humans is encoded by the BCAP31 gene.

== Interactions ==
BCAP31 has been shown to interact with:

- APP,
- BCL2L1,
- BCL2,
- CASP8, and

== BCAP31-related disorders ==
The BCAP31 (B-Cell-Associated Protein 31) gene, located at Xq28, encodes BAP31, which plays a role in ER-to-Golgi anterograde transport. As the gene is located on the X-chromosome, these disorders primarily affect males. Patients commonly present with a congenital neurological phenotype characterized by severe intellectual disability (ID), dystonia, deafness, and central hypomyelination, delineating a so-called deafness, dystonia and cerebral hypomyelination syndrome (DDCH). Most patients with a Loss of Function pathogenic BCAP31 variant have permanent or transient liver enzyme elevation.

BCAP31.org is a resource started by parents of a child with a BCAP31-related disorder diagnosis which aims support families affected by the BCAP31 gene variant, clinicians treating patients, and researchers pursuing treatments by collaboration or funding efforts.
