= IMMT =

Protein-coding gene in the species Homo sapiens

Identifiers
- Aliases: IMMT, HMP, MINOS2, P87, P87/89, P89, PIG52, Mic60, PIG4, inner membrane mitochondrial protein, MICOS60, mitofilin
- External IDs: OMIM: 600378; MGI: 1923864; GeneCards: IMMT

Gene location (Human)
Chr.	Chromosome 2 (human)
Band	2p11.2|2	Start	86,143,932 bp
Band	2p11.2|2	End	86,195,472 bp

Gene location (Mouse)
Chr.	Chromosome 6 (mouse)
Band	6|6 C1	Start	71,808,315 bp
Band	6|6 C1	End	71,854,372 bp
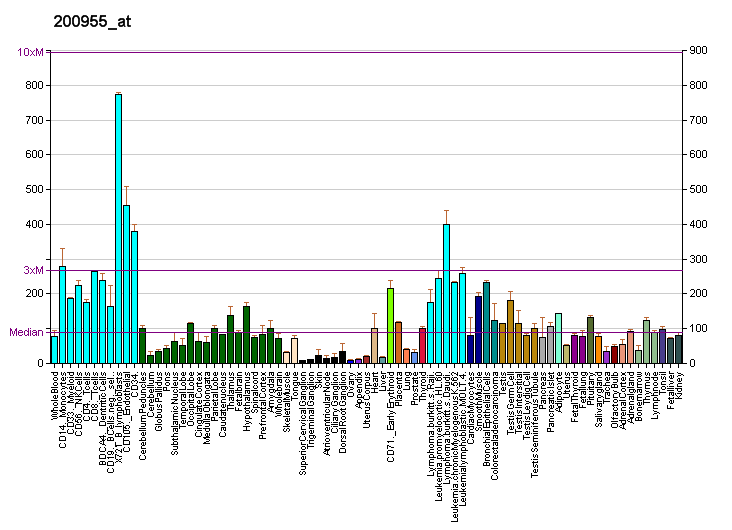
RNA expression pattern
Bgee	Human / Mouse (ortholog); Top expressed in: left ventricle; gastrocnemius muscle; apex of heart; right auricle of heart; biceps brachii; right ventricle; Skeletal muscle tissue of biceps brachii; gonad; right adrenal cortex; body of tongue / Top expressed in: myocardium of ventricle; tail of embryo; genital tubercle; right kidney; right ventricle; cardiac muscles; soleus muscle; muscle of thigh; digastric muscle; brown adipose tissue; More reference expression data
BioGPS	More reference expression data
Gene ontology
Molecular function	protein binding; RNA binding
Cellular component	integral component of membrane; mitochondrial inner membrane; myelin sheath; MICOS complex; membrane; mitochondrion
Biological process	cristae formation; mitochondrial calcium ion homeostasis
Sources:Amigo / QuickGO
Orthologs
Databases	NCBI: entry; OMA: entry
Species	Human	Mouse
Entrez	10989	76614
Ensembl	ENSG00000132305	ENSMUSG00000052337
UniProt	Q16891	Q8CAQ8
RefSeq (mRNA)	NM_001100169; NM_001100170; NM_006839	NM_001253681; NM_001253686; NM_001253687; NM_001253688; NM_001253689 NM_029673; NM_001362134; NM_001362136; NM_001362137; NM_001362138
RefSeq (protein)	NP_001093639; NP_001093640; NP_006830	NP_001240610; NP_001240615; NP_001240616; NP_001240617; NP_001240618 NP_083949; NP_001349063; NP_001349065; NP_001349066; NP_001349067
Location (UCSC)	Chr 2: 86.14 – 86.2 Mb	Chr 6: 71.81 – 71.85 Mb
PubMed search
- Wikidata
View/Edit Human	View/Edit Mouse

Mitochondrial inner membrane protein is a protein that in humans is encoded by the IMMT gene.)

IMMT encodes an inner mitochondrial membrane (IMM) protein in the nucleus. It is posttranslational transported to the IMM. Mic60/Mitofilin (encoded by the IMMT gene) is a core subunit of the MICOS-complex, directly located next to cristae junctions (CJ). Human Mic60 exists in two isoforms of different size, anchored to the IMM via its N-terminus, while most of the protein is located to the inner mitochondrial space (IMS).

== Function ==
Mic60 is evolutionary one of the oldest MICOS subunits as homologous were found in anaerobic prokaryotes. It is mainly present in two isoforms (ca. 88 and 90 kDa). In the brain, four isoforms are known, which differ in their isoelectric point due to different post-translational modifications. The amino terminus of Mic60 is anchored in the IM, while most of the protein is extended to the IMS. C-terminal Mic60 has a conserved mitofilin domain which is crucial for building the MICOS-complex. A central coiled-coil domain is required to enable protein-protein interactions.

=== Interactions ===
Mic60 indirectly interacts with all known MICOS-complex and SAM complex components. It directly interacts with Mic25, Mic19 and SAM50. Together with Mic25 and Mic19, Mic60 forms the Mic60-Mic19-Mic25 subcomplex. This subcomplex, especially Mic60, is crucial for the physical contact between the IMM and the outer mitochondrial membrane (OMM) via its interaction with SAM50. Mic60 also interacts with the translocase of the OMM (TOM) and the translocase of the IMM (TIM) to ensure the localization of Mic60 near to CJs. Through its interaction with TOM and TIM, Mic60 additionally influences the import of precursor proteins.

== Localisation/Import ==
Mic60 is translated in the cytosol and translocated into the IMS via TOMM40. TIMM23 transports Mic60 into the IM, where a mitochondrial processing peptidase (MPP) cleaves of the N-terminal mitochondrial targeting signal (MTS). Mic60 is anchored in the IMM through its transmembrane (TM) domain.

== Interactions ==
IMMT has been shown to interact with BAT2.)
