= Dynamin-like 120 kDa protein =

Protein-coding gene in the species Homo sapiens

OPA1

Identifiers
- Aliases: OPA1, MGM1, NPG, NTG, largeG, Optic atrophy 1, BERHS, MTDPS14, mitochondrial dynamin like GTPase, OPA1 mitochondrial dynamin like GTPase
- External IDs: OMIM: 605290; MGI: 1921393; HomoloGene: 14618; GeneCards: OPA1; OMA:OPA1 - orthologs

Gene location (Human)
| Chr. | Chromosome 3 (human) |
| Band | 3q29 | Start | 193,593,144 bp |
| Band | 3q29 | End | 193,697,811 bp |

Gene location (Mouse)
| Chr. | Chromosome 16 (mouse) |
| Band | 16 B2|16 20.65 cM | Start | 29,398,152 bp |
| Band | 16 B2|16 20.65 cM | End | 29,473,702 bp |
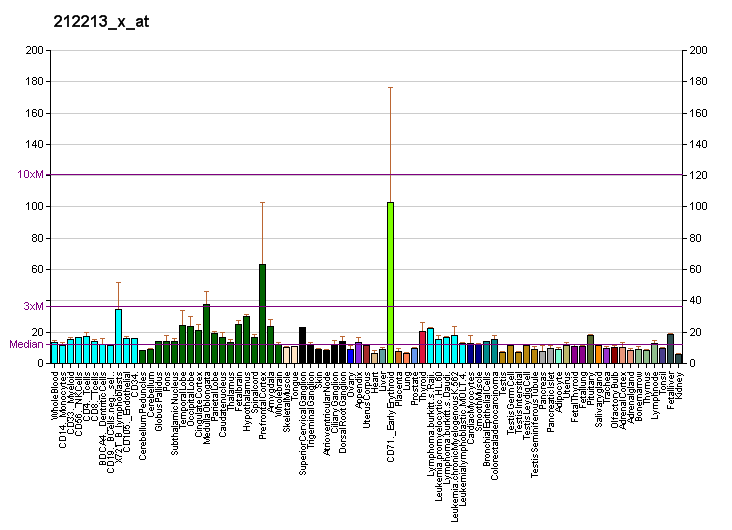

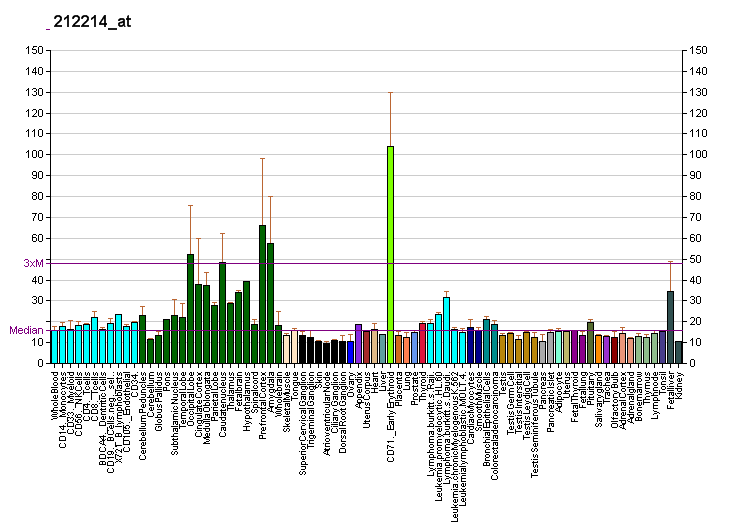

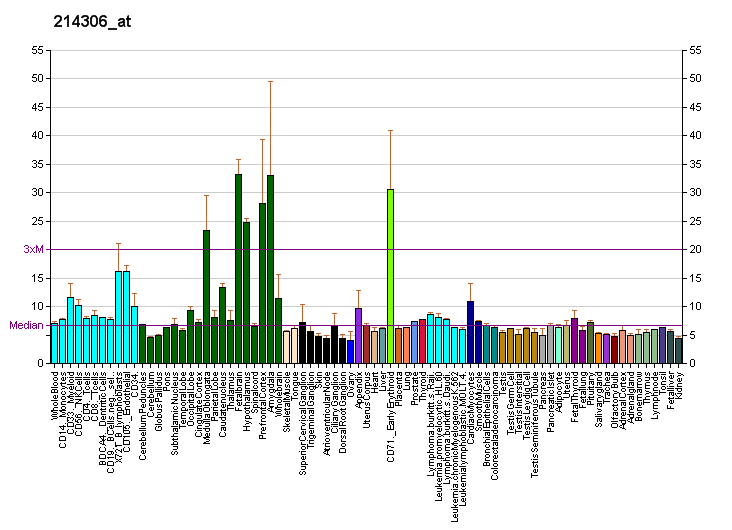
RNA expression pattern
| Bgee | Human / Mouse (ortholog); Top expressed in: Achilles tendon; endothelial cell; secondary oocyte; lateral nuclear group of thalamus; Brodmann area 23; middle temporal gyrus; right ventricle; monocyte; rectum; superior frontal gyrus / Top expressed in: dorsal striatum; olfactory tubercle; nucleus accumbens; pontine nuclei; temporal lobe; Region I of hippocampus proper; subiculum; medial vestibular nucleus; myocardium of ventricle; substantia nigra; More reference expression data |
| BioGPS | More reference expression data |
Gene ontology
| Molecular function | nucleotide binding; GTP binding; protein binding; hydrolase activity; magnesium ion binding; microtubule binding; GTPase activity; phosphatidic acid binding; cardiolipin binding; lipid binding; kinase binding |
| Cellular component | integral component of membrane; membrane; mitochondrial intermembrane space; nucleoplasm; mitochondrial outer membrane; extrinsic component of mitochondrial inner membrane; dendrite; mitochondrial crista; mitochondrion; axon cytoplasm; mitochondrial inner membrane; mitochondrial membranes; cytosol; cytoplasm |
| Biological process | mitochondrial fusion; negative regulation of endoplasmic reticulum stress-induced intrinsic apoptotic signaling pathway; inner mitochondrial membrane organization; mitochondrial genome maintenance; mitochondrial fission; response to stimulus; negative regulation of release of cytochrome c from mitochondria; ageing; mitochondrion organization; positive regulation of dendrite development; cellular senescence; axonal transport of mitochondrion; positive regulation of mitochondrial fusion; positive regulation of neuron maturation; visual perception; apoptotic process; dynamin family protein polymerization involved in mitochondrial fission; regulation of apoptotic process; intracellular distribution of mitochondria; positive regulation of dendritic spine morphogenesis; mitochondrion morphogenesis; response to muscle activity; GTP metabolic process; cellular response to glucose stimulus; cellular response to hypoxia; membrane tubulation; response to electrical stimulus; response to nutrient levels; protein complex oligomerization; calcium import into the mitochondrion; retina development in camera-type eye; cochlea development; positive regulation of cellular response to insulin stimulus; cellular response to L-glutamate; negative regulation of apoptotic process; positive regulation of insulin receptor signaling pathway; membrane fusion; response to curcumin |
Sources:Amigo / QuickGO
Orthologs
| Species | Human | Mouse |
| Entrez | 4976 | 74143 |
| Ensembl | ENSG00000198836 | ENSMUSG00000038084 |
| UniProt | O60313 | P58281 |
| RefSeq (mRNA) | NM_015560; NM_130831; NM_130832; NM_130833; NM_130834 NM_130835; NM_130836; NM_130837; NM_001354663; NM_001354664 | NM_001199177; NM_133752 |
| RefSeq (protein) | NP_056375; NP_570844; NP_570845; NP_570846; NP_570847 NP_570848; NP_570849; NP_570850; NP_001341592; NP_001341593 | NP_001186106; NP_598513; NP_001390099; NP_001390100; NP_001390101 NP_001390111 |
| Location (UCSC) | Chr 3: 193.59 – 193.7 Mb | Chr 16: 29.4 – 29.47 Mb |
| PubMed search |
- Wikidata
| View/Edit Human | View/Edit Mouse |

Dynamin-like 120 kDa protein, mitochondrial is a protein that in humans is encoded by the OPA1 gene. This protein regulates mitochondrial fusion and cristae structure in the inner mitochondrial membrane (IMM) and contributes to ATP synthesis and apoptosis, and small, round mitochondria. Mutations in this gene have been implicated in dominant optic atrophy (DOA), leading to loss in vision, hearing, muscle contraction, and related dysfunctions.

== Structure ==
Eight transcript variants encoding different isoforms, resulting from alternative splicing of exon 4 and two novel exons named 4b and 5b, have been reported for this gene. They fall under two types of isoforms: long isoforms (L-OPA1), which attach to the IMM, and short isoforms (S-OPA1), which localize to the intermembrane space (IMS) near the outer mitochondrial membrane (OMM). S-OPA1 is formed by proteolysis of L-OPA1 at the cleavage sites S1 and S2, removing the transmembrane domain.

The OPA1 transcript may be alternatively spliced to incorporate a poison exon between exons 5 and 6 or between exons 5b and 6.

== Function ==
This gene product is a nuclear-encoded mitochondrial protein with similarity to dynamin-related GTPases. It is a component of the mitochondrial network. The OPA1 protein localizes to the inner mitochondrial membrane, where it regulates mitochondrial fusion and cristae structure. OPA1 mediates mitochondrial fusion in cooperation with mitofusins 1 and 2 and participates in cristae remodeling by the oligomerization of two L-OPA1 and one S-OPA1, which then interact with other protein complexes to alter cristae structure. Its cristae regulating function also contributes to its role in oxidative phosphorylation and apoptosis, as it is required to maintain mitochondrial activity during low-energy substrate availability. Moreover, stabilization of mitochondrial cristae by OPA1 protects against mitochondrial dysfunction, cytochrome c release, and reactive oxygen species production, thus preventing cell death. Mitochondrial SLC25A transporters can detect these low levels and stimulate OPA1 oligomerization, leading to tightening of the cristae, enhanced assembly of ATP synthase, and increased ATP production. Stress from an apoptotic response can interfere with OPA1 oligomerization and prevent mitochondrial fusion.

== Clinical significance ==
Mutations in this gene have been associated with optic atrophy type 1, which is a dominantly inherited optic neuropathy resulting in progressive loss of visual acuity, leading in many cases to legal blindness. Dominant optic atrophy (DOA) in particular has been traced to mutations in the GTPase domain of OPA1, leading to sensorineural hearing loss, ataxia, sensorimotor neuropathy, progressive external ophthalmoplegia, and mitochondrial myopathy. As the mutations can lead to degeneration of auditory nerve fibres, cochlear implants provide a therapeutic means to improve hearing thresholds and speech perception in patients with OPA1-derived hearing loss.

Mitochondrial fusion involving OPA1 and MFN2 may be associated with Parkinson's disease.

Stoke Therapeutics is evaluating the splice-switching antisense oligonucleotide STK-002 as a potential treatment for DOA. STK-002 reduces poison exon inclusion in the OPA1 transcript, leading to increased OPA1 protein levels.

== Interactions ==
OPA1 has been shown to interact with:

- Adenonucleotide transporters,
- ATP synthase,
- CHCHD3,
- Mitofilin,
- Prohibitin,
- SAMM50, and
- SLC25A.

== See also ==
- Kjer's optic neuropathy
