= MFN1 =

Protein-coding gene in the species Homo sapiens

Identifiers
- Aliases: MFN1, hfzo1, hfzo2, mitofusin 1
- External IDs: OMIM: 608506; MGI: 1914664; GeneCards: MFN1
Available structures
PDB	Ortholog search: PDBe RCSB
PDB	List of PDB id codes 1T3J

Gene location (Human)
Chr.	Chromosome 3 (human)
Band	3q26.33	Start	179,347,709 bp
Band	3q26.33	End	179,394,936 bp

Gene location (Mouse)
Chr.	Chromosome 3 (mouse)
Band	3 A3|3 15.75 cM	Start	32,583,614 bp
Band	3 A3|3 15.75 cM	End	32,633,388 bp
RNA expression pattern
Bgee	Human / Mouse (ortholog); Top expressed in: secondary oocyte; Achilles tendon; body of pancreas; gastric mucosa; epithelium of colon; right hemisphere of cerebellum; right uterine tube; right auricle of heart; skin of leg; canal of the cervix / Top expressed in: myocardium of ventricle; digastric muscle; right ventricle; cardiac muscle tissue of left ventricle; extraocular muscle; soleus muscle; extensor digitorum longus muscle; muscle of thigh; thoracic diaphragm; sternocleidomastoid muscle; More reference expression data
BioGPS	n/a
Gene ontology
Molecular function	nucleotide binding; GTP binding; protein binding; hydrolase activity; GTPase activity
Cellular component	cytoplasm; mitochondrial outer membrane; mitochondrion; membrane; integral component of mitochondrial outer membrane; outer mitochondrial membrane protein complex; integral component of membrane; intrinsic component of mitochondrial outer membrane
Biological process	mitochondrial fusion; macroautophagy; GTP metabolic process; mitochondrion localization
Sources:Amigo / QuickGO
Orthologs
Databases	NCBI: entry; OMA: entry
Species	Human	Mouse
Entrez	55669	67414
Ensembl	ENSG00000171109	ENSMUSG00000027668
UniProt	Q8IWA4	Q811U4
RefSeq (mRNA)	NM_017927; NM_033540	NM_024200
RefSeq (protein)	NP_284941	NP_077162
Location (UCSC)	Chr 3: 179.35 – 179.39 Mb	Chr 3: 32.58 – 32.63 Mb
PubMed search
- Wikidata
View/Edit Human	View/Edit Mouse

Mitofusin-1 is a protein that in humans is encoded by the MFN1 gene.

The protein encoded by this gene is a mediator of mitochondrial fusion. This protein and mitofusin 2 are homologs of the Drosophila protein fuzzy onion (Fzo). They are mitochondrial membrane proteins that interact with each other to facilitate mitochondrial targeting.
