= Mitochondrial fusion =

Merging of two or more mitochondria within a cell to form a single compartment

Mitochondria are dynamic organelles with the ability to fuse and divide (fission), forming constantly changing tubular networks in most eukaryotic cells. These mitochondrial dynamics, first observed over a hundred years ago are important for the health of the cell, and defects in dynamics lead to genetic disorders. Through fusion, mitochondria can overcome the dangerous consequences of genetic malfunction. The process of mitochondrial fusion involves a variety of proteins that assist the cell throughout the series of events that form this process.

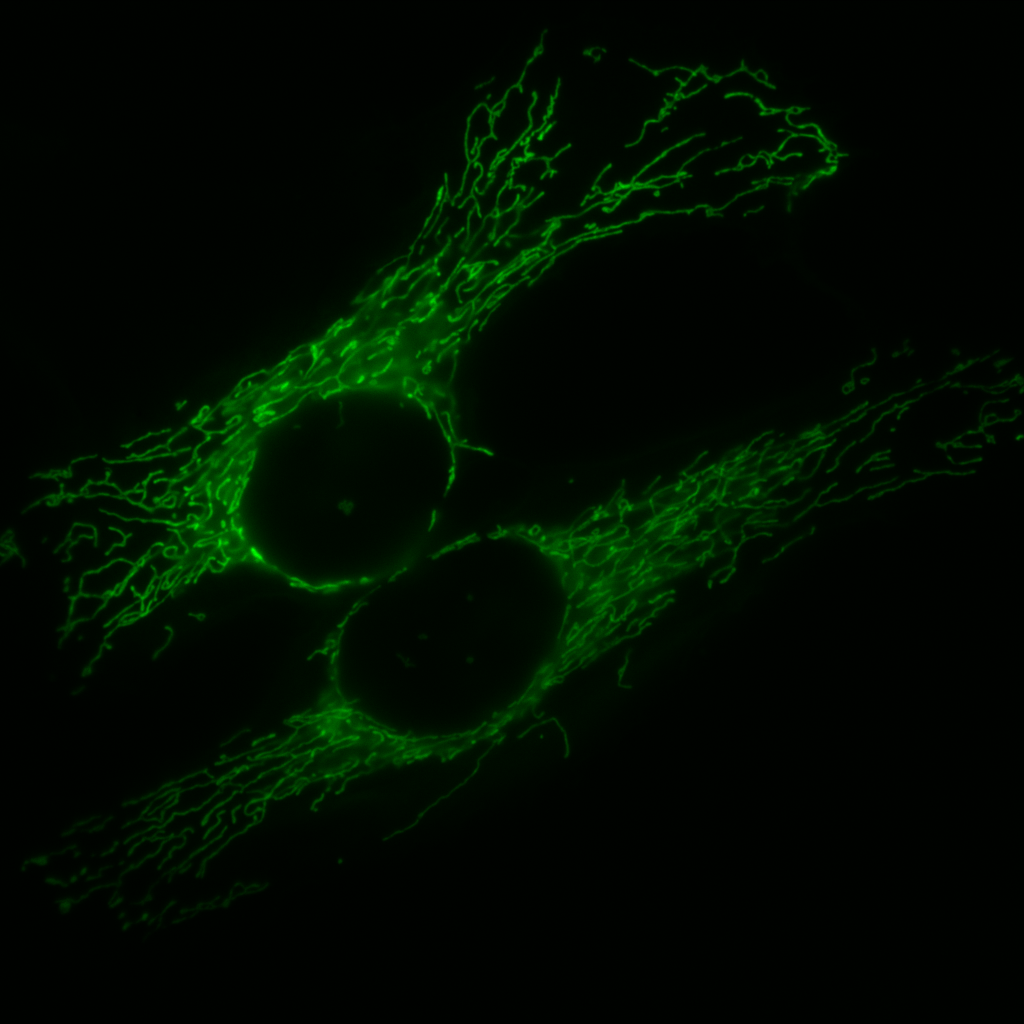
Mitochondrial network (green) in two human cells (HeLa cells)

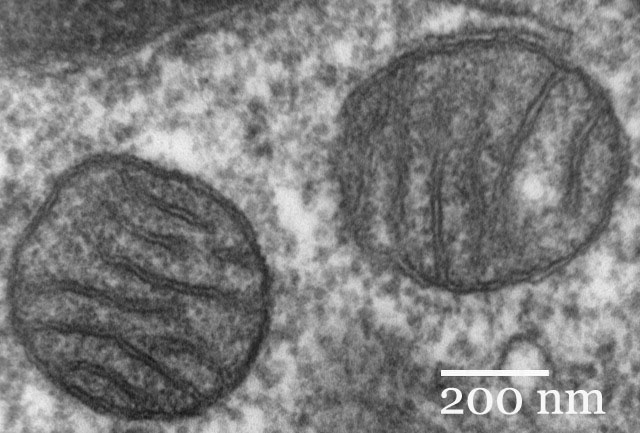
Mitochondria, mammalian lung - TEM (2)

== Process overview ==
When cells experience metabolic or environmental stresses, mitochondrial fusion and fission work to maintain functional mitochondria. An increase in fusion activity leads to mitochondrial elongation, whereas an increase in fission activity results in mitochondrial fragmentation. The components of this process can influence programmed cell death and lead to neurodegenerative disorders such as Parkinson's disease. Such cell death can be caused by disruptions in the process of either fusion or fission.

The shapes of mitochondria in cells are continually changing via a combination of fission, fusion, and motility. Specifically, fusion assists in modifying stress by integrating the contents of slightly damaged mitochondria as a form of complementation. By enabling genetic complementation, fusion of the mitochondria allows for two mitochondrial genomes with different defects within the same organelle to individually encode what the other lacks. In doing so, these mitochondrial genomes generate all of the necessary components for a functional mitochondrion.

== With mitochondrial fission ==
The combined effects of continuous fusion and fission give rise to mitochondrial networks. The mechanisms of mitochondrial fusion and fission are regulated by proteolysis and posttranslational modifications. The actions of fission, fusion and motility cause the shapes of mitochondria to continually change.

The changes in balance between the rates of mitochondrial fission and fusion directly affect the wide range of mitochondrial lengths that can be observed in different cell types. Rapid fission and fusion of the mitochondria in cultured fibroblasts has been shown to promote the redistribution of mitochondrial green fluorescent protein (GFP) from one mitochondrion to all of the other mitochondria. This process can occur in a cell within a time period as short as an hour.

The significance of mitochondrial fission and fusion is distinct for nonproliferating neurons, which are unable to survive without mitochondrial fission. Such nonproliferating neurons cause two human diseases known as dominant optic atrophy and Charcot Marie Tooth disease type 2A, which are both caused by fusion defects. Though the importance of these processes is evident, it is still unclear why mitochondrial fission and fusion are necessary for nonproliferating cells.

== Regulation ==
Many gene products that control mitochondrial fusion have been identified, and can be reduced to three core groups which also control mitochondrial fission. These groups of proteins include mitofusins, OPA1/Mgm1, and Drp1/Dnm1. All of these molecules are GTP hydrolyzing proteins (GTPases) that belong to the dynamin family. Mitochondrial dynamics in different cells are understood by the way in which these proteins regulate and bind to each other. These GTPases in control of mitochondrial fusion are well conserved between mammals, flies, and yeast. Mitochondrial fusion mediators differ between the outer and inner membranes of the mitochondria. Specific membrane-anchored dynamin family members mediate fusion between mitochondrial outer membranes known as Mfn1 and Mfn2. These two proteins are mitofusin contained within humans that can alter the morphology of affected mitochondria in over-expressed conditions. However, a single dynamin family member known as OPA1 in mammals mediates fusion between mitochondrial inner membranes. In mammals, the two proteolytic systems mediated by Parkin-PINK1 and Oma1 regulate mitochondrial fusion through Mfn1 and Opa1. These regulating proteins of mitochondrial fusion are organism-dependent; therefore, in Drosophila (fruit flies) and yeasts, the process is controlled by the mitochondrial transmembrane GTPase, Fzo. In Drosophila, Fzo is found in postmeiotic spermatids and the dysfunction of this protein results in male sterility. However, a deletion of Fzo1 in budding yeast results in smaller, spherical mitochondria due to the lack of mitochondrial DNA (mtDNA).

== Apoptosis ==
The balance between mitochondrial fusion and fission in cells is dictated by the up-and-down regulation of mitofusins, OPA1/Mgm1, and Drp1/Dnm1. Apoptosis, or programmed cell death, begins with the breakdown of mitochondria into smaller pieces. This process results from up-regulation of Drp1/Dnm1 and down-regulation of mitofusins. Later in the apoptosis cycle, an alteration of OPA1/Mgm1 activity within the inner mitochondrial membrane occurs. The role of the OPA1 protein is to protect cells against apoptosis by inhibiting the release of cytochrome c. Once this protein is altered, there is a change in the cristae structure, release of cytochrome c, and the activation of the destructive caspase enzymes. These resulting changes indicate that inner mitochondrial membrane structure is linked with regulatory pathways in influencing cell life and death. OPA1 plays both a genetic and molecular role in mitochondrial fusion and in cristae remodeling during apoptosis. OPA1 exists in two forms; the first being soluble and found in the intermembrane space, and the second as an integral inner membrane form, work together to restructure and shape the cristae during and after apoptosis. OPA1 blocks intramitochondrial cytochrome c redistribution which proceeds remodeling of the cristae. OPA1 functions to protect cells with mitochondrial dysfunction due to Mfn deficiencies, doubly for those lacking Mfn1 and Mfn2, but it plays a greater role in cells with only Mfn1 deficiencies as opposed to Mfn2 deficiencies. Therefore, it is supported that OPA1 function is dependent on the amount of Mfn1 present in the cell to promote mitochondrial elongation.

== In mammals ==
Both proteins, Mfn1 and Mfn2, can act either together or separately during mitochondrial fusion. Mfn1 and Mfn2 are 81% similar to each other and about 51% similar to the Drosophila protein Fzo. Results published for a study to determine the impact of fusion on mitochondrial structure revealed that Mfn-deficient cells demonstrated either elongated cells (majority) or small, spherical cells upon observation.

The Mfn protein has three different methods of action: Mfn1 homotypic oligomers, Mfn2 homotypic oligomers and Mfn1-Mfn2 heterotypic oligomers. It has been suggested that the type of cell determines the method of action but it has yet to be concluded whether or not Mfn1 and Mfn2 perform the same function in the process or if they are separate. Cells lacking this protein are subject to severe cellular defects such as poor cell growth, heterogeneity of mitochondrial membrane potential and decreased cellular respiration.

Mitochondrial fusion plays an important role in the process of embryonic development, as shown through the Mfn1 and Mfn2 proteins. Using Mfn1 and Mfn2 knock-out mice, which die in utero at midgestation due to a placental deficiency, mitochondrial fusion was shown not to be essential for cell survival in vitro, but necessary for embryonic development and cell survival throughout later stages of development. Mfn1 Mfn2 double knock-out mice, which die even earlier in development, were distinguished from the "single" knock-out mice. Mouse embryo fibroblasts (MEFs) originated from the double knock-out mice, which do survive in culture even though there is a complete absence of fusion, but parts of their mitochondria show a reduced mitochondrial DNA (mtDNA) copy number and lose membrane potential. This series of events causes problems with adenosine triphosphate (ATP) synthesis.

== The Mitochondrial Inner/Outer Membrane Fusion (MMF) Family ==
The Mitochondrial Inner/Outer Membrane Fusion (MMF) Family (TC# 9.B.25) is a family of proteins that play a role in mitochondrial fusion events. This family belongs to the larger Mitochondrial Carrier (MC) Superfamily. The dynamic nature of mitochondria is critical for function. Chen and Chan (2010) have discussed the molecular basis of mitochondrial fusion, its protective role in neurodegeneration, and its importance in cellular function. The mammalian mitofusins Mfn1 and Mfn2, GTPases localized to the outer membrane, mediate outer-membrane fusion. OPA1, a GTPase associated with the inner membrane, mediates subsequent inner-membrane fusion. Mutations in Mfn2 or OPA1 cause neurodegenerative diseases. Mitochondrial fusion enables content mixing within a mitochondrial population, thereby preventing permanent loss of essential components. Cells with reduced mitochondrial fusion show a subpopulation of mitochondria that lack mtDNA nucleoids. Such mtDNA defects lead to respiration-deficient mitochondria, and their accumulation in neurons leads to impaired outgrowth of cellular processes and consequent neurodegeneration.

=== Family members ===
A representative list of the proteins belonging to the MMF family is available in the Transporter Classification Database.

- 9.B.25.1.1 - The mitochondrial inner/outer membrane fusion complex, Fzo/Mgm1/Ugo1. Only the Ugo1 protein is a member of the MC superfamily.
- 9.B.25.2.1 - The mammalian mitochondrial membrane fusion complex, Mitofusin 1 (Mfn1)/Mfn2/Optical Atrophy Protein 1 (OPA1) complex. This subfamily includes mitofusins 1 and 2.

=== Mitofusins: Mfn1 and Mfn2 ===
Mfn1 and Mfn2 (TC# 9.B.25.2.1; Q8IWA4 and O95140, respectively), in mammalian cells are required for mitochondrial fusion, Mfn1 and Mfn2 possess functional distinctions. For instance, the formation of tethered structures in vitro occurs more readily when mitochondria are isolated from cells overexpressing Mfn1 than Mfn2. In addition, Mfn2 specifically has been shown to associate with Bax and Bak (Bcl-2 family, TC#1.A.21), resulting in altered Mfn2 activity, indicating that the mitofusins possess unique functional characteristics. Lipidic holes may open on opposing bilayers as intermediates, and fusion in cardiac myocytes is coupled with outer mitochondrial membrane destabilization that is opportunistically employed during the mitochondrial permeability transition.

Mutations in Mfn2 (but not Mfn1) result in the neurological disorder Charcot-Marie-Tooth syndrome. These mutations can be complemented by the formation of Mfn1–Mfn2^{CMT2A} hetero-oligomers but not homo-oligomers of Mfn2^{+}–Mfn2^{CMT2A}_{.} This suggests that within the Mfn1–Mfn2 hetero-oligomeric complex, each molecule is functionally distinct. This suggests that control of the expression levels of each protein likely represents the most basic form of regulation to alter mitochondrial dynamics in mammalian tissues. Indeed, the expression levels of Mfn1 and Mfn2 vary according to cell or tissue type as does the mitochondrial morphology.

=== Yeast mitochondrial fusion proteins ===
In yeast, three proteins are essential for mitochondrial fusion. Fzo1 (P38297) and Mgm1 (P32266) are conserved guanosine triphosphatases that reside in the outer and inner membranes, respectively. At each membrane, these conserved proteins are required for the distinct steps of membrane tethering and lipid mixing. The third essential component is Ugo1, an outer membrane protein with a region homologous to but distantly related to a region in the Mitochondrial Carrier (MC) family. Hoppins et al., 2009 showed that Ugo1 is a modified member of this family, containing three transmembrane domains and existing as a dimer, a structure that is critical for the fusion function of Ugo1. Their analyses of Ugo1 indicate that it is required for both outer and inner membrane fusion after membrane tethering, indicating that it operates at the lipid-mixing step of fusion. This role is distinct from the fusion dynamin-related proteins and thus demonstrates that at each membrane, a single fusion protein is not sufficient to drive the lipid-mixing step. Instead, this step requires a more complex assembly of proteins. The formation of a fusion pore has not yet been demonstrated. The Ugo1 protein is a member of the MC superfamily.

== See also ==
- Mitochondrial fission
- Mitochondrial carriers
- MFN1
- MFN2
- OPA1
- DNM1
- Transporter Classification Database
