= Mitochondrial fission =

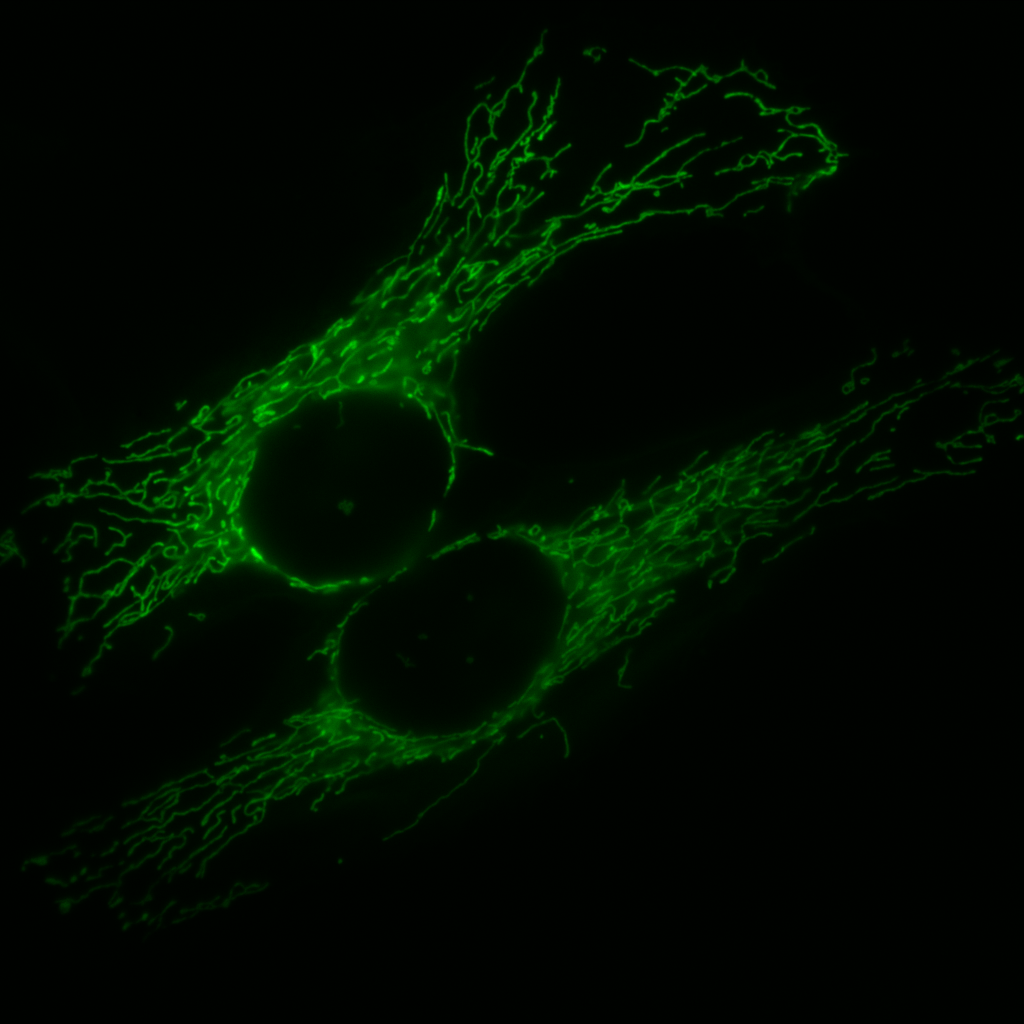
Mitochondrial network (green) in two human cells (HeLa cells)

Mitochondrial fission is the process by which mitochondria divide or segregate into two separate mitochondrial organelles. Mitochondrial fission is counteracted by mitochondrial fusion, where two mitochondria fuse together to form a larger one. Fusion can result in elongated mitochondrial networks. In healthy cells, mitochondrial fission and fusion are balanced, and disruptions to these processes are linked to various diseases. Mitochondrial fission is coordinated with the mitochondrial DNA replication process. Some of the proteins involved in mitochondrial fission have been identified, and mutations in some of these proteins are associated with mitochondrial diseases. Mitochondrial fission plays a role in the cellular stress response, including loss of sleep, and in apoptosis (programmed cell death).

== Mechanism ==
=== Drp1 ===
The Drp1 protein, a member of the dynamin family of large GTPases, is transcribed from the DNM1L gene. Alternative splicing produces at least ten isoforms of Drp1, which regulate tissue-specific mitochondrial fission. Drp1 is involved in the fission of both mitochondria and peroxisomes. The folded Drp1 monomer consists of four regions: a head, neck, stalk, and tail. The head region is the GTPase (G) domain, while the neck is composed of three bundle signaling elements (BSEs). The stalk consists of two units that participate in three interface interactions. These interactions allow the assembly of Drp1 into higher-order oligomers: first, two monomers associate into dimers through hydrophobic patches on the stalk, then two dimers associate into tetramers, and finally, tetramers can assemble into larger oligomeric structures.

Although Drp1 is not localized to the mitochondrial membrane, it can associate with the mitochondrial membrane via interactions with several adaptor proteins. In yeast cells (a common model for studying mitochondrial fission), the outer membrane protein Fis1 associates with Mdv1 and Caf4, which in turn recruit Drp1. In mammals, FIS1 does not participate in fission but instead plays a role in mitophagy. In human cells, four adaptor proteins can help recruit Drp1 to the mitochondria: FIS1, MiD49, MiD51, and MFF. MiD51, also named MIEF1, can inhibit Drp1's function, favoring mitochondrial fusion instead of fission.

Regulation of Drp1 occurs by the phosphorylation of its Ser616 and Ser637 residues. Phosphorylation at Ser616 promotes Drp1 activity and thus mitochondrial fission, while phosphorylation at Ser637 inhibits Drp1. Calcineurin, activated by increased calcium ion levels, can dephosphorylate the Ser637 site, thus promoting fission.

Mitochondria form contact sites with the endoplasmic reticulum (ER), where preconstriction sites are created, which are necessary but not sufficient for fission. Inverted formin 2 (INF2), an ER-localized protein, with the help of SPIRE1C on the mitochondria, promotes actin polymerization. Bundles of actin cross diagonally at these sites, recruiting myosin II, which assists in localizing Drp1 to the mitochondria. Actin bundles serve as reservoirs of Drp1 proteins, providing a pool for assembly onto the mitochondrial surface. Actin polymerization also triggers calcium ion influx from the ER into the mitochondria, resulting in the dephosphorylation of Ser637 on Drp1, leading to mitochondrial fission.

Drp1 typically assembles into rings composed of 16 monomers that encircle the mitochondrial membrane and constrict it. Several Drp1 rings can form helical structures that tubulate the membrane. The G domains of adjacent Drp1 monomers interact (G-G interactions), repositioning catalytic sites to induce GTP hydrolysis, which drives conformational changes. These changes assist in the final membrane scission, producing two separate mitochondria. The exact mechanism of final membrane separation is still not fully understood.

=== Role of other organelles ===
Phosphatidylinositol 4-phosphate (PI(4)P) must be delivered to the mitochondrial membrane for fission to proceed. One method of PI(4)P delivery to mitochondria-ER contact sites is via the Golgi apparatus. The Golgi contains ARF1 proteins localized on its membranes, which recruit kinases that promote the synthesis of PI(4)P. PI(4)P is then delivered to the mitochondria-ER contact sites via vesicles derived from the Golgi apparatus.

Lysosomes are also frequently involved in mitochondrial fission, though they are not essential for the process. Contact between mitochondria and lysosomes is mediated by the Rab7 protein, which associates with lysosomes and a mitochondrial outer membrane protein called TBC1D15. Before fission proceeds, Rab7 dissociates from lysosomes by hydrolyzing GTP. Additionally, contacts between the ER and lysosomes occur, which also depend on Rab7. A subset of these contacts is mediated by oxysterol-binding protein-related protein 1L (ORP1L). ORP1L interacts with lysosomes via Rab7 and with the ER via VAMP-associated proteins (VAPs). This forms three-way contact sites between the mitochondria, ER, and lysosomes.

Lysosomes are recruited by the ER only after Drp1 has been recruited to the mitochondrial membrane (Drp1 recruitment occurs after preconstriction). ORP1L is also necessary for transferring PI(4)P from lysosomes to mitochondria. Therefore, PI(4)P is delivered to the mitochondria from both the Golgi and lysosomes. It remains unclear whether the two organelles supply PI(4)P for different purposes during mitochondrial fission, at different steps in the process, or if they contribute to distinct forms of mitochondrial fission altogether.

=== Peripheral and Midzone Division ===
Recent findings suggest that mitochondria undergo two distinct mechanisms of fission. In an elongated mitochondrial network, fission can occur either near the center (at the midzone) or towards one of the two ends (the periphery). Midzone and peripheral divisions appear to be associated with different cellular processes. Midzone division is linked to mitochondrial biogenesis, which occurs when the cell is proliferating and requires an increased number of mitochondria. In contrast, peripheral division is associated with the removal of damaged mitochondrial units from the network, with these mitochondria being targeted for autophagy or mitophagy, leading to their degradation.

Peripheral division is often preceded by elevated concentrations of reactive oxygen species (ROS), as well as reduced membrane potential and pH. These two types of fission are regulated by distinct molecular mechanisms. During peripheral division, the adaptor protein FIS1 is primarily responsible for recruiting Drp1, while during midzone division, the adaptor protein MFF plays a key role in Drp1 recruitment. Interestingly, MiD49 and MiD51 are involved in both forms of division. Additionally, lysosomal contact sites with mitochondria are only observed during peripheral division.

== See also ==
- Mitochondrial fusion
- Binary fission
