= DNM1L =

Protein-coding gene in humans

Identifiers
- Aliases: DNM1L, DLP1, DRP1, DVLP, DYMPLE, EMPF, HDYNIV, dynamin 1-like, dynamin 1 like, EMPF1, OPA5
- External IDs: OMIM: 603850; MGI: 1921256; GeneCards: DNM1L
Available structures
PDB	Ortholog search: PDBe RCSB
PDB	List of PDB id codes 3W6N, 3W6O, 3W6P, 4BEJ, 4H1U, 4H1V
Enzyme activity
EC #	BRENDA	ExPASy	KEGG	MetaCyc
3.6.5.5	↗	↗	↗	↗

Gene location (Human)
Chr.	Chromosome 12 (human)
Band	12p11.21	Start	32,679,200 bp
Band	12p11.21	End	32,745,650 bp

Gene location (Mouse)
Chr.	Chromosome 16 (mouse)
Band	16|16 A2	Start	16,130,094 bp
Band	16|16 A2	End	16,176,823 bp
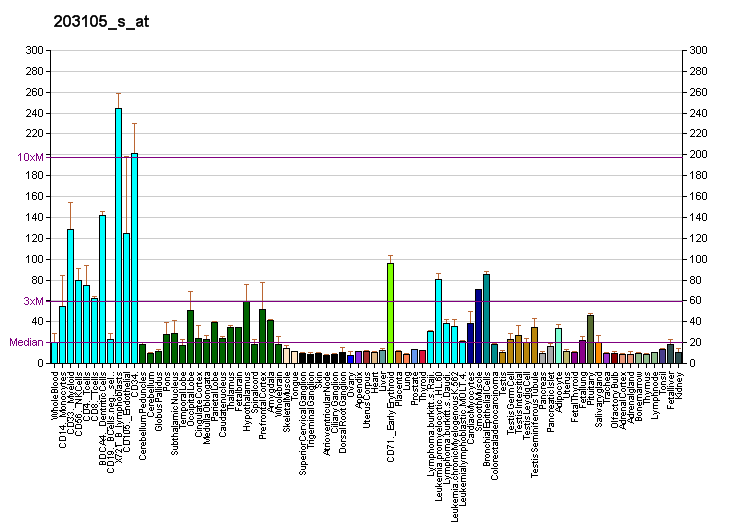
RNA expression pattern
Bgee	Human / Mouse (ortholog); Top expressed in: lateral nuclear group of thalamus; pars compacta; sperm; pars reticulata; Brodmann area 23; external globus pallidus; parietal lobe; superior vestibular nucleus; postcentral gyrus; entorhinal cortex / Top expressed in: ventral tegmental area; dorsomedial hypothalamic nucleus; habenula; dorsal tegmental nucleus; pontine nuclei; medial geniculate nucleus; lateral hypothalamus; paraventricular nucleus of hypothalamus; lateral geniculate nucleus; medial dorsal nucleus; More reference expression data
BioGPS	More reference expression data
Gene ontology
Molecular function	nucleotide binding; protein homodimerization activity; GTP binding; protein binding; GTPase activity; identical protein binding; hydrolase activity; ubiquitin protein ligase binding; lipid binding; GTPase activator activity; GTP-dependent protein binding; microtubule binding; clathrin binding; protein-containing complex binding; BH2 domain binding
Cellular component	cytoplasm; cytosol; Golgi apparatus; membrane; intracellular membrane-bounded organelle; microtubule cytoskeleton; peroxisome; synapse; synaptic vesicle membrane; mitochondrial outer membrane; cell junction; mitochondrion; brush border; perinuclear region of cytoplasm; clathrin-coated pit; microtubule; cytoplasmic vesicle; endomembrane system; endoplasmic reticulum membrane; Golgi membrane; endoplasmic reticulum; mitochondrial membranes; protein-containing complex; postsynapse; presynaptic endocytic zone membrane; mitochondrion-derived vesicle; secretory vesicle
Biological process	mitochondrial fragmentation involved in apoptotic process; regulation of ATP metabolic process; positive regulation of mitochondrial fission; endocytosis; cellular component disassembly involved in execution phase of apoptosis; mitochondrial fission; regulation of mitochondrion organization; regulation of protein oligomerization; regulation of peroxisome organization; membrane fusion; peroxisome fission; regulation of autophagy of mitochondrion; positive regulation of protein secretion; positive regulation of apoptotic process; protein localization to mitochondrion; positive regulation of release of cytochrome c from mitochondria; necroptosis; dynamin family protein polymerization involved in mitochondrial fission; heart contraction; mitochondrion morphogenesis; protein homotetramerization; mitochondrial membrane fission; positive regulation of intrinsic apoptotic signaling pathway; release of cytochrome c from mitochondria; positive regulation of GTPase activity; protein complex oligomerization; programmed cell death; mitochondrion organization; endoplasmic reticulum organization; apoptotic mitochondrial changes; negative regulation of mitochondrial fusion; synaptic vesicle recycling via endosome; intracellular distribution of mitochondria; synaptic vesicle endocytosis; protein homooligomerization; positive regulation of dendritic spine morphogenesis; cellular response to lipid; cellular response to oxygen-glucose deprivation; execution phase of apoptosis; positive regulation of synaptic vesicle endocytosis; response to flavonoid; response to hypobaric hypoxia; positive regulation of synaptic vesicle exocytosis; calcium ion transport; regulation of gene expression; regulation of ubiquitin protein ligase activity; rhythmic process
Sources:Amigo / QuickGO
Orthologs
Databases	NCBI: entry; OMA: entry
Species	Human	Mouse
Entrez	10059	74006
Ensembl	ENSG00000087470	ENSMUSG00000022789
UniProt	O00429	Q8K1M6
RefSeq (mRNA)	NM_001278463; NM_001278464; NM_001278465; NM_001278466; NM_005690 NM_012062; NM_012063; NM_001330380	NM_001025947; NM_001276340; NM_001276341; NM_152816; NM_001360007 NM_001360008; NM_001360009; NM_001360010
RefSeq (protein)	NP_001265392; NP_001265393; NP_001265394; NP_001265395; NP_001317309 NP_005681; NP_036192; NP_036193	NP_001021118; NP_001263269; NP_001263270; NP_690029; NP_001346936 NP_001346937; NP_001346938; NP_001346939; NP_001392181; NP_001392182; NP_001392183; NP_001392184; NP_001392185; NP_001392186; NP_001392187; NP_001392188; NP_001392189; NP_001392190; NP_001392191; NP_001392192; NP_001392193; NP_001392194
Location (UCSC)	Chr 12: 32.68 – 32.75 Mb	Chr 16: 16.13 – 16.18 Mb
PubMed search
- Wikidata
View/Edit Human	View/Edit Mouse

Dynamin-1-like protein is a GTPase that mediates fission in peroxisomes and mitochondria. In humans, dynamin-1-like protein, also known as dynamin-related protein 1 (Drp1), is encoded by the DNM1L gene. Mutations in DNM1L are associated with EMPF1 (Encephalopathy due to defective mitochondrial and peroxisomal fission 1).

== Structure ==
The primary function of DNM1L is membrane scission, which requires energy from GTP hydrolysis. DNM1L is a member of the dynamin superfamily of proteins, and as all dynamins consists of a GTPase catalytic domain, that provides the energy for the reaction, and a stalk domain, that contains the middle domain and a GTPase effector domain (GED). These regions are required for the self-assembly property of DNM1L, that exists as dimers and its further oligomerization is required for its function. DNM1L has an additional unique sequence, the variable domain (VD), an intrinsically disordered region, that is responsible for lipid sensing.

== Function ==
Mitochondria routinely undergo fission and fusion events that maintain a dynamic reticular network. Drp1 is a fundamental component of mitochondrial fission. Indeed, Drp1 deficient neurons have large, strongly interconnected mitochondria due to dysfunctional fission machinery. Fission helps facilitate mitophagy, which is the breakdown and recycling of damaged mitochondria. Dysfunction in the DRP activity may result in mutated DNA or malfunctioning proteins diffusing throughout the mitochondrial system. In addition, fission results in fragmented mitochondria more capable of producing of reactive oxygen species, which can disrupt normal biochemical processes inside of cells. ROS can be formed from incomplete transfer of electrons through the electron transport chain. Furthermore, fission influences calcium flux within the cell, linking Drp1 to apoptosis and cancer.

Several studies have indicated that Drp1 is essential for proper embryonic development. Drp1 knockout mice exhibit abnormal brain development and die around embryonic day 12. In neural specific Drp1 knockout mice, brain size is reduced and apoptosis is increased. Synapse formation and neurite growth are also impaired. A second group of researchers generated another neural specific knockout mouse line. They found that knocking out Drp1 resulted in the appearance of large mitochondria in Purkinje cells and prevented neural tube formation.

In humans, loss of Drp1 function affects brain development and is also associated with early mortality.

== Interactions ==
The majority of knowledge about mitochondrial fission comes from studies with yeast. The yeast homolog of Drp1 is dynamin-1 (Dnm1), which interacts with Fis1 through Mdv1. This interaction causes Dnm1 to oligomerize and form rings around dividing mitochondria at the so-called "constriction point". Drp1 has also been shown to interact with GSK3B. In mammals, Drp1 receptors include Mff, Mid49 and Mid51

Post-translational modifications to Drp1 (e.g. phosphorylation) can alter its activity and affect the rate of fission.

Drp1 has two major phosphorylation sites. The CDK phosphorylation site is S579, and the PKA site is S600 in Drp1 isoform 3. Phosphorylation by CDK is thought to be activating, whereas PKA phosphorylation is thought to be inhibitory. Recently, CaMKII was shown to phosphorylate Drp1 at S616. This was shown to occur in response to chronic Beta-adrenergic stimulation and to promote mPTP opening. Other post-translational modifications include S-nitrosylation, sumoylation, and ubiquitination. Higher S- nitrosylation modifications of Drp1, which enhances Drp1 activity, have been observed in Alzheimer's Disease. Furthermore, Drp1 has been shown to interact with Aβ monomers, thought to play an important role in Alzheimer's Disease, exacerbating the disease and its symptoms. Drp1 has been linked to a number of pathways and processes including cell division, apoptosis, and necrosis. Drp1 has been shown to stabilize p53 during oxidative stress, promoting its translocation to the mitochondria and encouraging mitochondrial- related necrosis. In addition, cyclin B1- CDK activates Drp1, causing fragmentation and ensuring mitochondria are distributed to each daughter cell after mitosis. Likewise, different transcriptional controllers are able to alter Drp1 activity through gene expression and regulation. For example, PPARGC1A and [HIF1A] regulated Drp1 activity through gene expression.

== Therapy ==
Inhibition of Drp1 has been considered for possible therapeutics for a variety of diseases. The most studied inhibitor is a small molecule named mitochondrial division inhibitor 1 (mdivi-1) which may have off-target effects such as inhibition of complex 1 of the mitochondrial respiratory chain. The inhibitors putative function is preventing the GTPase activity of Drp1 thus preventing the activation and localization to the mitochondria. Midiv-1 has been demonstrated to attenuate the effects of ischemia reperfusion injury after cardiac arrest. The treatment prevented both mitochondria fragmentation and increased cell viability. Similarly, midiv-1 has demonstrated neuroprotective effects by greatly reducing neuron death due to seizure. Furthermore, the study showed midiv-1 was capable to preventing the activation of caspase 3 by reversing the release of cytochrome c in intrinsic apoptosis. Whether mdivi-1 inhibits Drp1 or not, its therapeutic potential is certainly evident. Other than directly inhibiting Drp1, certain inhibitors of proteins involved in the posttranslational modifications of Drp1 have been studied. FK506 is a calcineurin inhibitor, which functions to dephosphorylate the serine 637 position of Drp1, encouraging translocation to the mitochondria and fragmentation. FK506 was shown to also preserve mitochondrial morphology after reperfusion injury.
