= TIM/TOM complex =

mitochondrial protein-transporting ATPase

Identifiers
- EC no.: 7.4.2.3

Databases
- BRENDA: enzyme data
- ExPASy: NiceZyme view
- KEGG: enzyme entry
- MetaCyc: metabolic pathway
- Rhea: reactions
- PDB structures: RCSB PDB PDBe PDBsum
- Gene Ontology: AmiGO / QuickGO
Search
- PMC: articles
- PubMed: articles
- NCBI: proteins

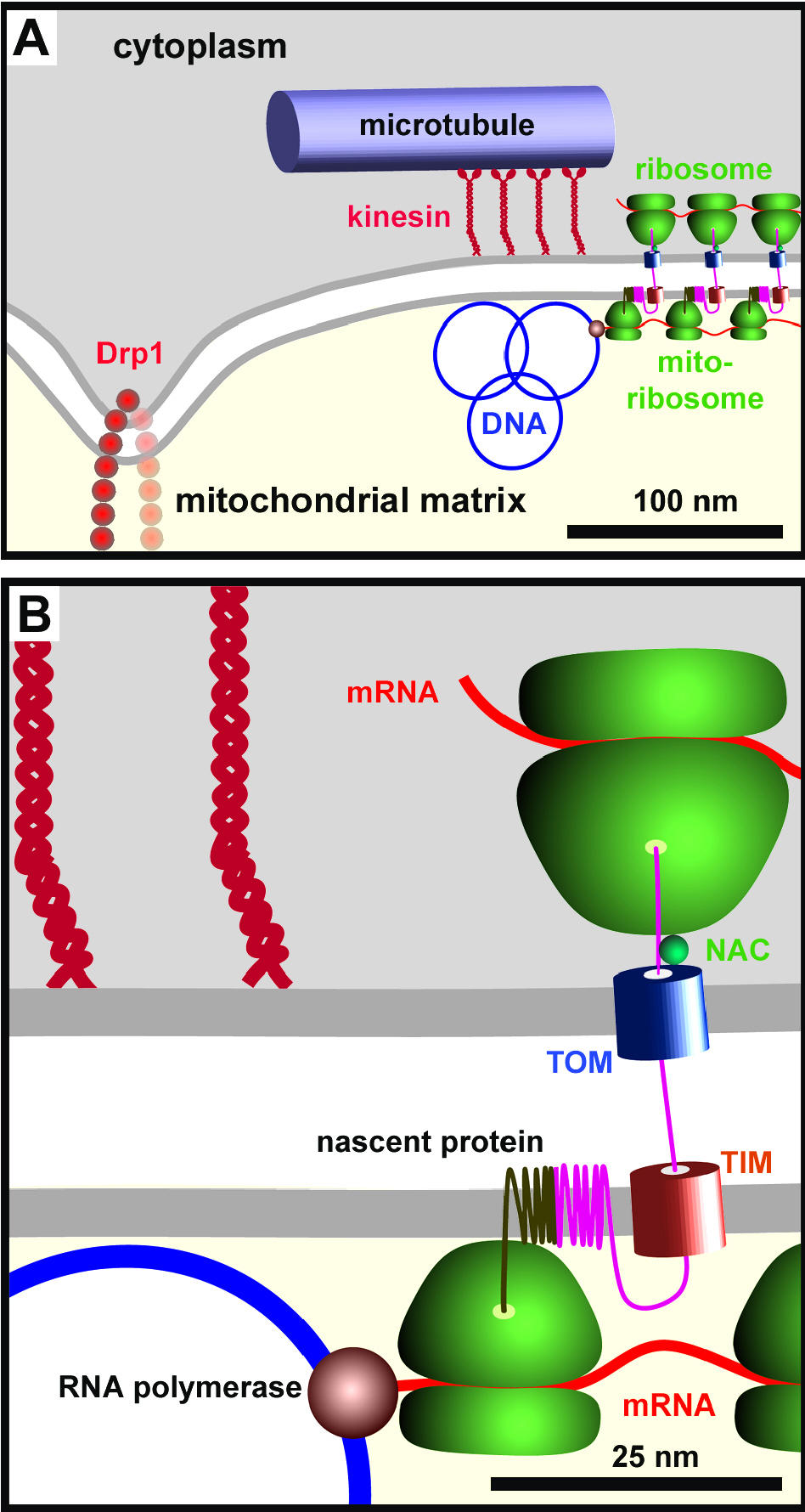
Simplified representation of the Mitochondrial DNA Organization proteins (top image). A close up of a single ribosome in coordination with the TOM complex on the outer mitochondrial membrane and the TIM complex on the inner Mitochondrial membrane (bottom image). The nascent transmembrane protein is being fed into the mitochondrial membrane where its target peptide (not shown) gets cleaved.

The TIM/TOM complex refers to cooperating protein translocases that import nuclear-encoded proteins into mitochondria. The translocase of the outer membrane (TOM) provides an entry route across the outer mitochondrial membrane. At the inner mitochondrial membrane, two TIM complexes handle different types of precursor proteins. TIM23 directs proteins with an amino-terminal targeting sequence into the mitochondrial matrix or inserts them into the inner membrane, while TIM22 inserts mitochondrial carrier proteins into the inner membrane.

== Composition ==
| Human complex | Location / description | Protein subunits |
|---|---|---|
| TIM22 | Inner mitochondrial membrane, carrier translocase | TIMM22, TIMM29, and AGK (acylglycerol kinase), together with assemblies of the small chaperones TIMM9, TIMM10 (Tim10a), and TIMM10B. |
| TIM23 | Inner mitochondrial membrane, presequence translocase | The core contains TIMM23, TIMM17A or TIMM17B, and TIMM50. TIMM21 and ROMO1 are associated subunits. |
| TOM | Outer mitochondrial membrane | TOMM40 forms the pore. TOMM22, TOMM5, TOMM6, and TOMM7 complete the core. TOMM20 and TOMM70 are associated receptors. TOMM22 also acts as a receptor. |

== Protein import pathways ==
Human mitochondrial DNA encodes 13 proteins. Most mitochondrial proteins are encoded by nuclear DNA, synthesised in the cytosol, and imported using targeting signals in their amino acid sequences.

=== Presequence pathway ===
In the presequence pathway, receptors of the TOM complex recognise an amino-terminal targeting sequence, known as a presequence. The precursor polypeptide passes through the TOM channel and is transferred to the TIM23 complex. The electrical potential across the inner mitochondrial membrane favours movement of the positively charged presequence towards the matrix. Cryo-electron microscopy has captured a substrate-engaged TOM–TIM23 supercomplex in budding yeast (Saccharomyces cerevisiae).

==== ATP-dependent import motor ====
For proteins destined for the matrix, the presequence translocase-associated motor (PAM) uses ATP hydrolysis to complete translocation. Tim44 recruits mitochondrial Hsp70 to the matrix side of the TIM23 complex, where Hsp70 binds the incoming polypeptide. The Hsp70 ATPase domain is crucial for binding Tim44, while the peptide-binding domain and carboxy-terminal segment contribute to the interaction. Changes in the nucleotide state of Hsp70 regulate its interaction with Tim44.

The enzyme classification for ATP-coupled mitochondrial protein transport is mitochondrial protein-transporting ATPase (EC 7.4.2.3), with the systematic name ATP phosphohydrolase (mitochondrial protein-importing).

=== Carrier pathway ===
Mitochondrial carrier proteins typically contain internal targeting signals. After passage through TOM, small Tim chaperones bind the carrier precursors in the intermembrane space and deliver them to the TIM22 complex, which inserts them into the inner membrane.

== TIC/TOC complex vs. TIM/TOM complex ==
This protein complex is functionally analogous to the TIC/TOC complex located on the inner and outer membranes of the chloroplast, in the sense that it transports proteins into the membrane of the mitochondria. Although they both hydrolyze triphosphates, they are evolutionally unrelated.
