= Tim9-Tim10 complex =

Tim9 and Tim10 make up the group of essential small Tim proteins that assist in transport of hydrophobic precursors across the intermembrane space in mammalian cells. Both Tim9 and Tim10 form a hexamer, the Tim9-Tim10 complex, that when associated, functions as a chaperone to assist translocation of preproteins from the outer mitochondrial membrane to the translocase of the inner membrane. The functional Tim9-Tim10 complex not only directs preproteins to the inner mitochondrial membrane in order to interact with the TIM22 complex, but also guides β-barrel precursor proteins to the sorting and assembly machinery (SAM) of the outer membrane.

== Structure of the Tim9-Tim10 complex ==
The Tim9-Tim10 complex is made up of three Tim9 molecules and three Tim10 molecules. Each Tim9 and Tim10 subunit consists of 80-110 amino acid residues with four conserved cysteine residues that form two intramolecular disulfide bonds. Each subunit folds into a helix-loop-helix structure, with each loop forming a donut shape that comprises the upper face of the complex. The structure of the Tim9-Tim10 complex takes on the form of an α-propeller, with two helical blades radiating from a narrow central pore.

== Biogenesis of the small Tims ==
Small Tim proteins are synthesised lacking a cleavable presequence, but instead containing internal targeting information and need to be imported to the intermembrane space. The intermembrane space import and assembly machinery (MIA) is believed to mediate transport of the small Tim precursors into the intermembrane space subcompartment. MIA is composed of two main essential cysteine-rich proteins; Mia40 and Erv1. Mia40 is also referred to as Tim40 in yeast and deficiency of Mia40 has been reported to affect import of the small Tims. Mia40 is anchored to the mitochondrial inner membrane via an N-terminal hydrophobic segment, exposing a large domain to the intermembrane space. It contains 6 conserved cysteine residues, which allow the binding of incoming Tim precursor proteins. Following import of small Tim proteins into the intermembrane space Mia40 interacts with small Tim proteins via disulfide bonds. Following isomerisation of the disulfide bridge, the polypeptide is released. Mia40 which is now in reduced state, is then oxidised by Erv1. This oxidation step is vital to facilitate further rounds of precursor protein import. Without Erv1 activity, reduced Mia40 accumulates and is in inactive conformation. Interaction between the incoming precursor proteins, Mia40 and Erv1, is maintained as a result of a flow of electrons that are transferred from the incoming protein to Mia40 and from reduced Mia40 to oxidised Erv1. Precursors are then released in oxidised state and form disulfide bridges which prevents their escape out of the intermembrane space. Small Tim proteins are then maintained in active conformation within the intermembrane space by Hot13 (helper of Tims). It is possible that Hot13 may have reducing effects on small Tim proteins as they counterbalance the harmful effects that oxidative agents exhibit.

== See also ==
- TIMM9 and TIMM10
