= Translocase =

Class of enzymes

Translocase is a general term for a protein that assists in moving another molecule, usually across a cell membrane. These enzymes catalyze the movement of ions or molecules across membranes or their separation within membranes. The reaction is designated as a transfer from “side 1” to “side 2” because the designations “in” and “out”, which had previously been used, can be ambiguous. Translocases are the most common secretion system in Gram positive bacteria.

It is also a historical term for the protein now called elongation factor G, due to its function in moving the transfer RNA (tRNA) and messenger RNA (mRNA) through the ribosome.

== History ==
The enzyme classification and nomenclature list was first approved by the International Union of Biochemistry in 1961. Six enzyme classes had been recognized based on the type of chemical reaction catalyzed, including oxidoreductases (EC 1), transferases (EC 2), hydrolases (EC 3), lyases (EC 4), isomerases (EC 5) and ligases (EC 6). However, it became apparent that none of these could describe the important group of enzymes that catalyse the movement of ions or molecules across membranes or their separation within membranes. Several of these involve the hydrolysis of ATP and had been previously classified as ATPases (EC 3.6.3.-), although the hydrolytic reaction is not their primary function. In August 2018, the International Union of Biochemistry and Molecular Biology classified these enzymes under a new enzyme class (EC) of translocases (EC 7).

== Mechanism of catalysis ==
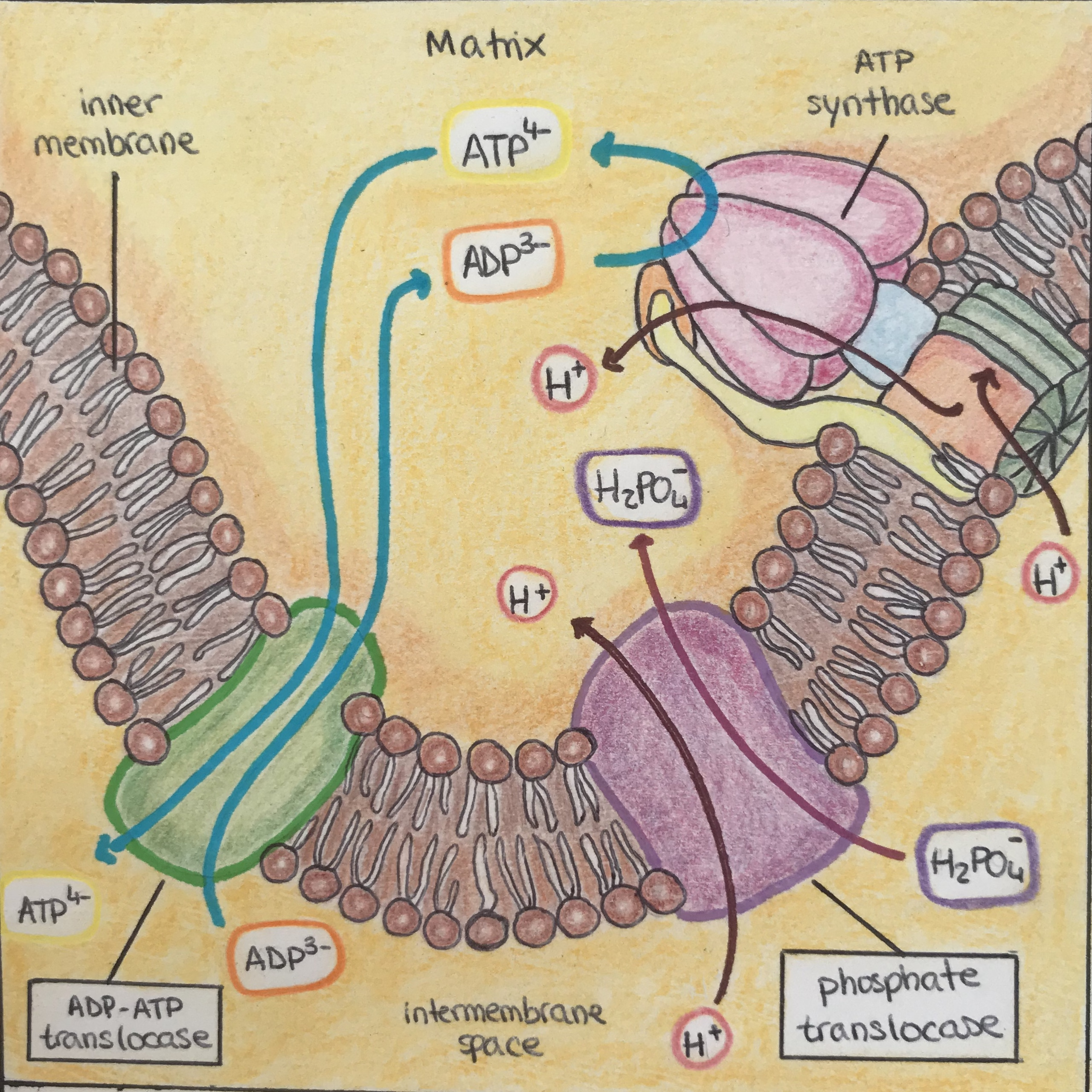
A) ATP-ADP translocase: protein responsible for the 1: 1 exchange of intramitochondrial ATP for ADP produced in the cytoplasm. B) Phosphate translocase: the transport of H2PO4- together with a proton are produced by symport H2PO4-/H+

The reaction most translocases catalyse is:

- AX + B_{side 1}|| = A + X + || B_{side 2}

A clear example of an enzyme that follows this scheme is H+-transporting two-sector ATPase:

- ATP + H_{2}O + 4 H^{+}_{side 1} = ADP + phosphate + 4 H^{+}_{side 2}

This ATPase carries out the dephosphorylation of ATP into ADP while it transports H^{+} to the other side of the membrane.

However, other enzymes that also fall into this category do not follow the same reaction scheme. This is the case of ascorbate ferrireductase:

- ascorbate_{side 1} + Fe(III)_{side 2} = monodehydroascorbate_{side 1} + Fe(II)_{side 2}

In which the enzyme only transports an electron in the catalysation of an oxidoreductase reaction between a molecule and an inorganic cation located on different sides of the membrane.

== Function ==
The basic function, as already mentioned (see: Translocase § Definition), is to "catalyse the movement of ions or molecules across membranes or their separation within membranes". This form of membrane transport is classified under active membrane transport, an energy-requiring process of pumping molecules and ions across membranes against a concentration gradient.

Translocases biological importance relies primarily on their critical function, in the way that they provide movement across the cell's membrane in many cellular processes that are substantial, such as:

Oxidative phosphorylation
ADP/ATP translocase (ANT) imports adenosine diphosphate ADP from the cytosol and exports ATP from the mitochondrial matrix, which are key transport steps for oxidative phosphorylation in eukaryotic organisms. ADP from the cytosol is transported back into the mitochondrion for ATP synthesis and the synthesised ATP, produced from oxidative phosphorylation, is exported out of the mitochondrion for use in the cytosol, providing the cells with its main energy currency.

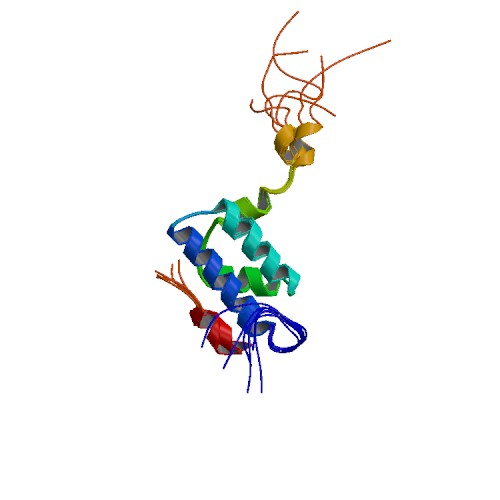
TOM: Translocase of the outer membrane. Mitochondrial import receptor subunit TOM20.

Protein import into mitochondria
Hundreds of proteins encoded by the nucleus are required for mitochondrial metabolism, growth, division, and partitioning to daughter cells, and all of these proteins must be imported into the organelle. Translocase of the outer membrane (TOM) and translocase of the inner membrane (TIM) mediate the import of proteins into the mitochondrion. The translocase of the outer membrane (TOM) sorts proteins via several mechanisms either directly to the outer membrane, the intermembrane space, or the translocase of the inner membrane (TIM). Then, generally, the TIM23 machinery mediates protein translocation into the matrix and the TIM22 machinery mediates insertion into the inner membrane.

Fatty acids import into mitochondria (Carnitine Shuttle System)
Carnitine-acylcarnitine translocase (CACT) catalyzes both unidirectional transport of carnitine and carnitine/acylcarnitine exchange in the inner mitochondrial membrane, allowing the import of long-chain fatty acids into the mitochondria where they are oxidized by the β-oxidation pathway. The mitochondrial membrane is impermeable to long-chain fatty acids, hence the need for this translocation.

== Classification ==
The enzyme subclasses designate the types of components that are being transferred, and the sub-subclasses indicate the reaction processes that provide the driving force for the translocation.

=== EC 7.1 Catalysing the translocation of hydrons ===
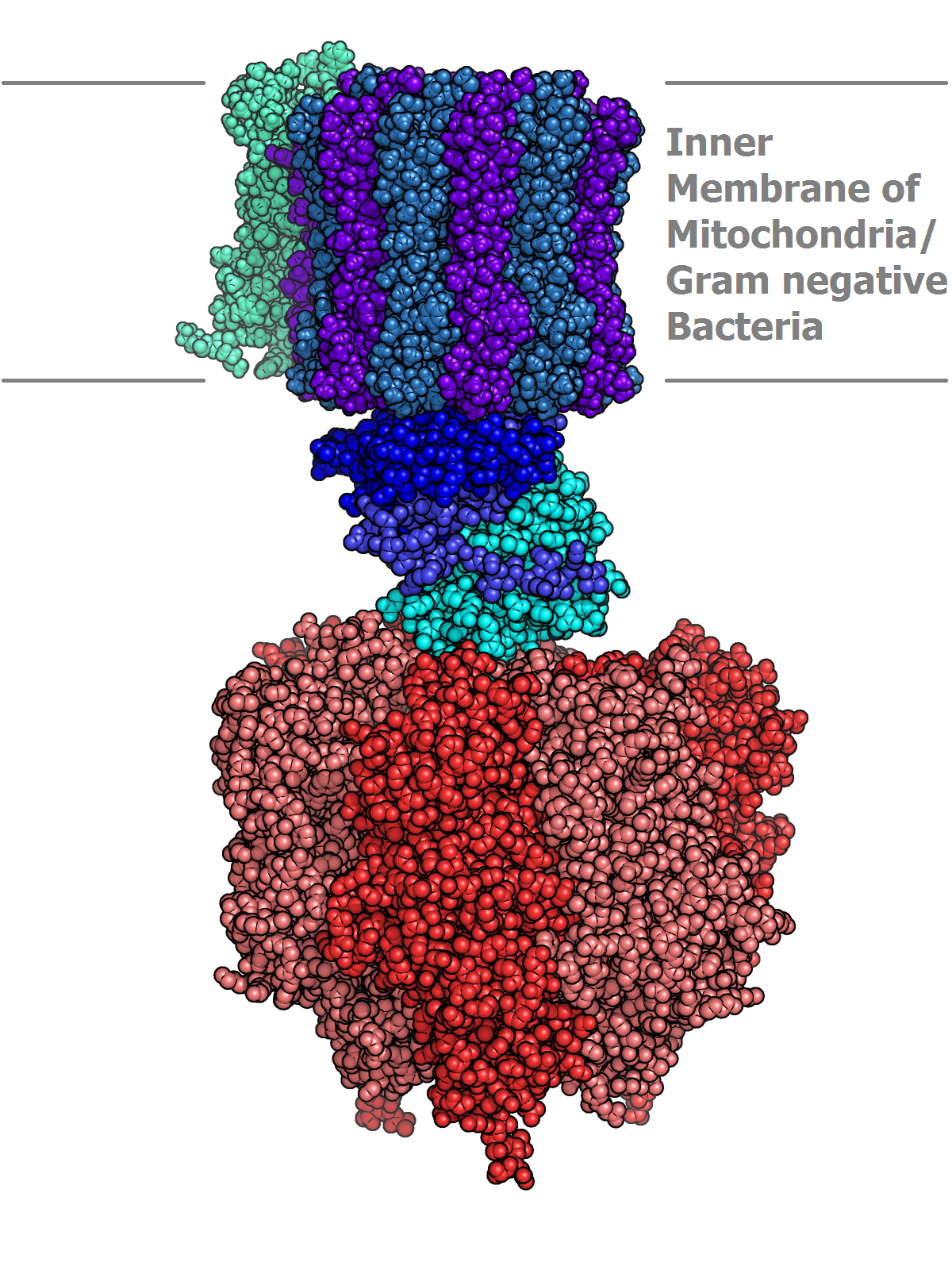
Structure of an ATP synthase (EC 7.1.2.2)

This subclass contains translocases that catalyze the translocation of hydrons. Based on the reaction they are linked to, EC 7.1 can be further classified into:

- EC 7.1.1 Hydron translocation or charge separation linked to oxidoreductase reactions
- EC 7.1.2 Hydron translocation linked to the hydrolysis of a nucleoside triphosphate
- EC 7.1.3 Hydron translocation linked to the hydrolysis of diphosphate

An important translocase contained in this group is ATP synthase, also known as EC 7.1.2.2.

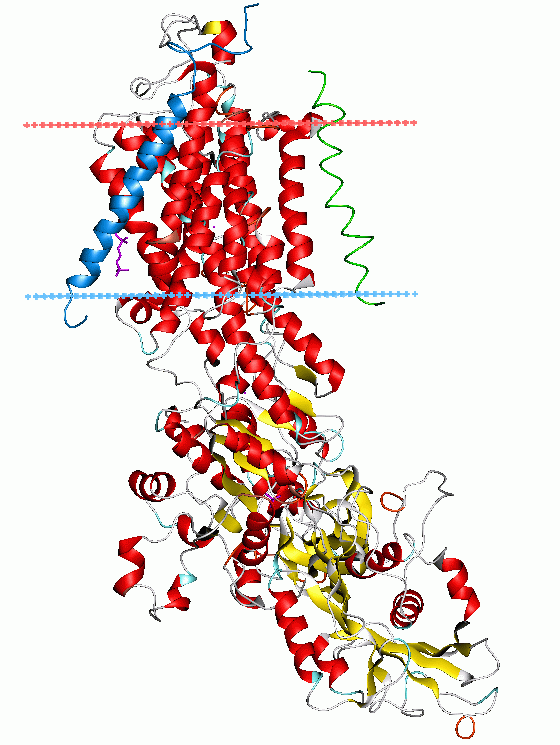
Structure of the Na+/K+ ATPase (EC 7.2.2.13).

=== EC 7.2 Catalysing the translocation of inorganic cations and their chelates ===
This subclass contains translocases that transfer inorganic cations (metal cations). Based on the reaction they're linked to, EC 7.2 can be further classified into:

- EC 7.2.1 Translocation of inorganic cations linked to oxidoreductase reactions
- EC 7.2.2 Translocation of inorganic cations linked to the hydrolysis of a nucleoside triphosphate
- EC 7.2.4 Translocation of inorganic cations linked to decarboxylation

An important translocase contained in this group is Na+/K+ pump, also known as EC 7.2.2.13.

=== EC 7.3 Catalysing the translocation of inorganic anions ===
This subclass contains translocases that transfer inorganic cations anions. Subclasses are based on the reaction processes that provide the driving force for the translocation. At present only one subclass is represented: EC 7.3.2 Translocation of inorganic anions linked to the hydrolysis of a nucleoside triphosphate.

7.3.2.1 ABC-type phosphate transporter
The expected taxonomic range for this enzyme is: Eukaryota, Bacteria. A bacterial enzyme that interacts with an extracytoplasmic substrate binding protein and mediates the high affinity uptake of phosphate anions. Unlike P-type ATPases, it does not undergo phosphorylation during the transport process.
- ATP + H_{2}O + phosphate [phosphate - binding protein][side 1] = ADP + phosphate + phosphate [side 2] + [phosphate - binding protein][side 1]

7.3.2.2 ABC-type phosphonate transporter
The enzyme, found in bacteria, interacts with an extracytoplasmic substrate binding protein and mediates the import of phosphonate and organophosphate anions.
- ATP + H_{2}O + phosphonate [phosphonate-binding protein][side 1] = ADP + phosphate + phosphonate [side 2] + [phosphonate- binding protein][side 1]

7.3.2.3 ABC-type sulfate transporter
The expected taxonomic range for this enzyme is: Eukaryota, Bacteria. The enzyme from Escherichia coli can interact with either of two periplasmic binding proteins and mediates the high affinity uptake of sulfate and thiosulfate. May also be involved in the uptake of selenite, selenate and possibly molybdate. Does not undergo phosphorylation during the transport.
- ATP + H_{2}O + sulfate [sulfate - binding protein] [side 1] = ADP + phosphate + sulfate [side 2] + [sulfate - binding protein][side 1]

7.3.2.4 ABC-type nitrate transporter
The expected taxonomic range for this enzyme is: Eukaryota, Bacteria. The enzyme, found in bacteria, interacts with an extracytoplasmic substrate binding protein and mediates the import of nitrate, nitrite, and cyanate.
- ATP + H_{2}O + nitrate [nitrate - binding protein][side 1] = ADP + phosphate + nitrate [side 2] + [nitrate - binding protein][side 1]

7.3.2.5 ABC-type molybdate transporter
The expected taxonomic range for this enzyme is: Archaea, Eukaryota, Bacteria. The enzyme, found in bacteria, interacts with an extracytoplasmic substrate binding protein and mediates the high-affinity import of molybdate and tungstate. Does not undergo phosphorylation during the transport process.
- ATP + H_{2}O + molybdate [molybdate - binding protein][side 1] = ADP + phosphate + molybdate [side 2] + [molybdate - binding protein][side 1]

7.3.2.6 ABC-type tungstate transporter
The expected taxonomic range for this enzyme is: Archaea, Bacteria. The enzyme, characterized from the archaeon Pyrococcus furiosus, the Gram-positive bacterium Peptoclostridium acidaminophilum (Eubacterium acidaminophilum) and the Gram-negative bacterium Campylobacter jejuni, interacts with an extracytoplasmic substrate binding protein and mediates the import of tungstate into the cell for incorporation into tungsten-dependent enzymes.
- ATP + H_{2}O + tungstate [tungstate - binding protein][side 1] = ADP + phosphate + tungstate [side 2] + [tungstate - binding protein][side 1]

=== EC 7.4 Catalysing the translocation of amino acids and peptides ===
Subclasses are based on the reaction processes that provide the driving force for the translocation. At present there is only one subclass: EC 7.4.2 Translocation of amino acids and peptides linked to the hydrolysis of a nucleoside triphosphate.

7.4.2.1 ABC-type polar-amino-acid transporter
The expected taxonomic range for this enzyme is: Eukaryota, Bacteria. The enzyme, found in bacteria, interacts with an extracytoplasmic substrate binding protein and mediates the import of polar amino acids. This entry comprises bacterial enzymes that import Histidine, Arginine, Lysine, Glutamine, Glutamate, Aspartate, ornithine, octopine and nopaline.
- ATP + H_{2}O + polar amino acid [polar amino acid-binding protein][side 1] = ADP + phosphate + polar amino acid [side 2] + [polar amino acid-binding protein][side1]

7.4.2.2 ABC-type nonpolar-amino-acid transporter
The expected taxonomic range for this enzyme is: Eukaryota, Bacteria. The enzyme, found in bacteria, interacts with an extracytoplasmic substrate binding protein. This entry comprises enzymes that import Leucine, Isoleucie and Valine.
- ATP + H_{2}O + non polar amino acid [non polar amino acid - binding protein][side 1] = ADP + phosphate + non polar amino acid [side 2] + [non polar amino acid - binding protein][side 1]

7.4.2.3 ABC-type mitochondrial protein-transporting ATPase
The expected taxonomic range for this enzyme is: Eukaryota, Bacteria. A non-phosphorylated, non-ABC (ATP-binding cassette) ATPase involved in the transport of proteins or preproteins into mitochondria using the TIM (Translocase of the Inner Membrane) protein complex. TIM is the protein transport machinery of the mitochondrial inner membrane that contains three essential TIM proteins: Tim17 and Tim23 are thought to build a preprotein translocation channel while Tim44 interacts transiently with the matrix heat-shock protein Hsp70 to form an ATP-driven import motor.
- ATP + H_{2}O + mitochondrial protein [side 1] = ADP + phosphate + mitochondrial protein [side 2]

7.4.2.4 ABC-type chloroplast protein-transporting ATPase
The enzyme appears in viruses and cellular organisms. Involved in the transport of proteins or preproteins into chloroplast stroma (several ATPases may participate in this process).
- ATP + H_{2}O + chloroplast protein [side 1] = ADP + phosphate + chloroplast protein [side 2]

7.4.2.5 ABC-type protein transporter
The expected taxonomic range for this enzyme is: Eukaryota, Bacteria. This entry stands for a family of bacterial enzymes that are dedicated to the secretion of one or several closely related proteins belonging to the toxin, protease and lipase families. Examples from Gram-negative bacteria include α-hemolysin, cyclolysin, colicin V and siderophores, while examples from Gram-positive bacteria include bacteriocin, subtilin, competence factor and pediocin.
- ATP + H_{2}O + protein [side 1] = ADP + phosphate + protein [side 2]

7.4.2.6 ABC-type oligopeptide transporter
A bacterial enzyme that interacts with an extracytoplasmic substrate binding protein and mediates the import of oligopeptides of varying nature. The binding protein determines the specificity of the system. Does not undergo phosphorylation during the transport process.
- ATP + H_{2}O + oligopeptide [oligopeptide - binding protein][side 1] = ADP + phosphate + oligopeptide [side 2] + [oligopeptide - binding protein][side 1]

7.4.2.7 ABC-type alpha-factor-pheromone transporter
The enzyme appears in viruses and cellular organisms characterized by the presence of two similar ATP-binding domains/proteins and two integral membrane domains/proteins. Does not undergo phosphorylation during the transport process. A yeast enzyme that exports the α-factor sex pheromone.
- ATP + H_{2}O + alpha factor [side 1] = ADP + phosphate + alpha factor [side 2]

7.4.2.8 ABC-type protein-secreting ATPase
The expected taxonomic range for this enzyme is: Archaea, Bacteria. A non-phosphorylated, non-ABC (ATP-binding cassette) ATPase that is involved in protein transport.
- ATP + H_{2}O + cellular protein [side 1] = ADP + phosphate + cellular protein [side 2]

7.4.2.9 ABC-type dipeptide transporter
The enzyme appears in viruses and cellular organisms. ATP-binding cassette (ABC) type transporter, characterized by the presence of two similar ATP-binding domains/proteins and two integral membrane domains/proteins. A bacterial enzyme that interacts with an extracytoplasmic substrate binding protein and mediates the uptake of dipeptides and tripeptides.
- ATP + H_{2}O + dipeptide [dipeptide - binding protein][side 1] = ADP + phosphate + [side 2] + [dipeptide - binding protein][side 1]

7.4.2.10 ABC-type glutathione transporter
A prokaryotic ATP-binding cassette (ABC) type transporter, characterized by the presence of two similar ATP-binding domains/proteins and two integral membrane domains/proteins. The enzyme from the bacterium Escherichia coli is a heterotrimeric complex that interacts with an extracytoplasmic substrate binding protein to mediate the uptake of glutathione.
- ATP + H_{2}O glutathione [glutathione - binding protein][side 1] = ADP + phosphate + glutathione [side 2] + [glutathione - binding protein][side 1]

7.4.2.11 ABC-type methionine transporter
A bacterial enzyme that interacts with an extracytoplasmic substrate binding protein and functions to import methionine.
- (1) ATP + H_{2}O + L-methionine [methionine - binding protein][side 1] = ADP + phosphate + L-methionine [side 2] + [methionine - binding protein][side 1]
- (2) ATP + H_{2}O + D-methionine [methionine - binding protein][side 1] = ADP + phosphate + D-methionine [side 2] + [methionine - binding protein][side 1]

7.4.2.12 ABC-type cystine transporter
A bacterial enzyme that interacts with an extracytoplasmic substrate binding protein and mediates the high affinity import of trace cystine. The enzyme from Escherichia coli K-12 can import both isomers of cystine and a variety of related molecules including djenkolate, lanthionine, diaminopimelate and homocystine.
- (1) ATP + H_{2}O + L-cystine [cystine - binding protein][side 1] = ADP + phosphate + L-cystine [side 2] + [cystine - binding protein][side 1]
- (2) ATP + H_{2}O + D-cystine [cystine - binding protein][side 1] = ADP + phosphate + D-cystine [side 2] + [cystine - binding protein][side 1]

=== EC 7.5 Catalysing the translocation of carbohydrates and their derivatives ===
- EC 7.5.2 Linked to the hydrolysis of a nucleoside triphosphate

=== EC 7.6 Catalysing the translocation of other compounds ===
- EC 7.6.2 Linked to the hydrolysis of a nucleoside triphosphate

== Examples ==
- ornithine translocase (SLC25A15), associated with ornithine translocase deficiency.
- carnitine-acylcarnitine translocase (SLC25A20), associated with carnitine-acylcarnitine translocase deficiency.
- Translocase of outer mitochondrial membrane 40 (TOMM40), a protein encoded by the TOMM40 gene, whose alleles differentially impact the risk for Alzheimer's disease

== See also ==
- Bacterial secretion system
- Membrane transport
- Protein targeting
- Translocon
