= PAM16 =

Protein-coding gene in the species Homo sapiens

Identifiers
- Aliases: PAM16, MAGMAS, TIM16, TIMM16, CGI-136, SMDMDM, presequence translocase-associated motor 16 homolog (S. cerevisiae), presequence translocase associated motor 16 homolog, presequence translocase associated motor 16
- External IDs: OMIM: 614336; MGI: 1913699; GeneCards: PAM16

Gene location (Human)
Chr.	Chromosome 16 (human)
Band	16p13.3	Start	4,331,549 bp
Band	16p13.3	End	4,355,607 bp

Gene location (Mouse)
Chr.	Chromosome 16 (mouse)
Band	16 A1|16 2.45 cM	Start	4,434,328 bp
Band	16 A1|16 2.45 cM	End	4,442,852 bp
RNA expression pattern
Bgee	Human / Mouse (ortholog); Top expressed in: gastrocnemius muscle; right lobe of liver; muscle of thigh; apex of heart; left ventricle; putamen; nucleus accumbens; right adrenal gland; right auricle of heart; skeletal muscle tissue / Top expressed in: primary oocyte; spermatid; spermatocyte; epiblast; quadriceps femoris muscle; lens; right kidney; proximal tubule; secondary oocyte; embryo; More reference expression data
BioGPS	n/a
Gene ontology
Molecular function	protein binding
Cellular component	mitochondrial inner membrane; extrinsic component of mitochondrial inner membrane; mitochondrial matrix; PAM complex, Tim23 associated import motor; TIM23 mitochondrial import inner membrane translocase complex; membrane; mitochondrion; protein-containing complex
Biological process	negative regulation of ATP-dependent activity; protein transport; protein import into mitochondrial matrix; ossification; negative regulation of apoptotic process; negative regulation of release of cytochrome c from mitochondria; negative regulation of apoptotic DNA fragmentation
Sources:Amigo / QuickGO
Orthologs
Databases	NCBI: entry; OMA: entry
Species	Human	Mouse
Entrez	51025	66449
Ensembl	ENSG00000217930; ENSG00000282228	ENSMUSG00000014301
UniProt	Q9Y3D7	Q9CQV1
RefSeq (mRNA)	NM_016069	NM_025571
RefSeq (protein)	NP_057153	NP_079847
Location (UCSC)	Chr 16: 4.33 – 4.36 Mb	Chr 16: 4.43 – 4.44 Mb
PubMed search
- Wikidata
View/Edit Human	View/Edit Mouse

Mitochondrial import inner membrane translocase subunit TIM16 also known as presequence translocated-associated motor subunit PAM16, mitochondria-associated granulocyte macrophage CSF-signaling molecule, or presequence translocated-associated motor subunit PAM16 is a protein that in humans is encoded by the PAM16 gene.

== Structure ==
The PAM16 gene is located on the p arm of chromosome 16 at position 13.3 and it spans 11,150 base pairs. The PAM16 gene produces a 15.1 kDa protein composed of 137 amino acids. The structure has been found to contain a 21-residue mitochondrial targeting leader sequence.

== Function ==
The PAM16 gene encodes for a mitochondrial protein with multiple functions. It is responsible for the regulation of ATP-dependent protein translocation into the mitochondrial matrix, inhibition of DNAJC19 stimulation of HSPA9/Mortalin ATPase activity, and granulocyte-macrophage colony-stimulating factor (GM-CSF) signaling. Furthermore, PAM16 plays a role in the import of nuclear-encoded mitochondrial proteins into the mitochondrial matrix and may be important in reactive oxygen species (ROS) homeostasis.

== Clinical Significance ==
Mutations in the PAM16 gene has been shown to cause mitochondrial deficiencies and associated disorders. It is mainly associated with Megarbane-Dagher-Melike type spondylometaphyseal dysplasia, which is an autosomal recessive disease characterized by pre- and postnatal short stature, developmental delay, dysmorphic facial appearance, narrow chest, prominent abdomen, platyspondyly, short limbs, and other abnormalities of the skeleton.

== Interactions ==
PAM16 has been known to interact with PAM18, DNAJC19, TIMM17A, FEZ1, TRIM25, MARC1, and other proteins.
