= DNAJC19 =

Protein-coding gene in the species Homo sapiens

Identifiers
- Aliases: DNAJC19, PAM18, TIM14, TIMM14, DnaJ heat shock protein family (Hsp40) member C19
- External IDs: OMIM: 608977; MGI: 3709029; GeneCards: DNAJC19

Gene location (Human)
Chr.	Chromosome 3 (human)
Band	3q26.33	Start	180,983,697 bp
Band	3q26.33	End	180,989,774 bp
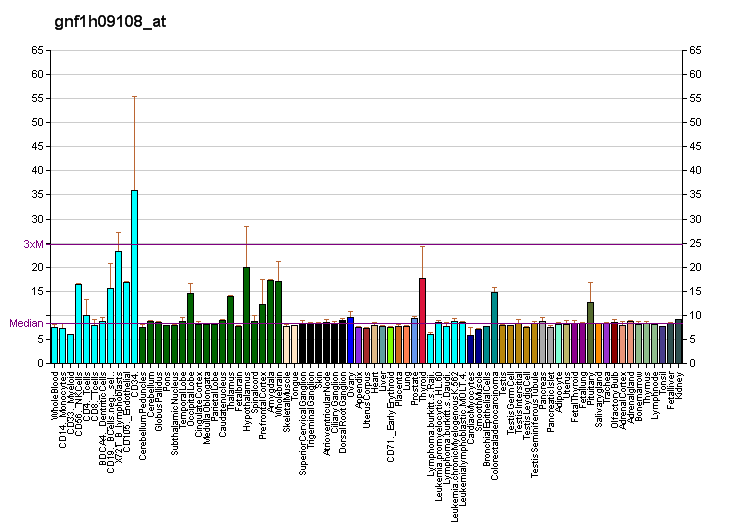
RNA expression pattern
Bgee	Human / Mouse (ortholog); Top expressed in: tendon of biceps brachii; Achilles tendon; muscle of thigh; myocardium of left ventricle; tibialis anterior muscle; gastrocnemius muscle; deltoid muscle; apex of heart; quadriceps femoris muscle; left adrenal gland / n/a; More reference expression data
BioGPS	More reference expression data
Gene ontology
Molecular function	protein binding; ATPase activator activity
Cellular component	integral component of membrane; mitochondrial inner membrane; membrane; mitochondrion; protein-containing complex; PAM complex, Tim23 associated import motor
Biological process	protein transport; protein folding; visual perception; genitalia development; protein targeting to mitochondrion; protein import into mitochondrial matrix; positive regulation of ATP-dependent activity
Sources:Amigo / QuickGO
Orthologs
Databases	NCBI: entry; OMA: entry
Species	Human	Mouse
Entrez	131118	100503724
Ensembl	ENSG00000205981	ENSMUSG00000083854
UniProt	Q96DA6	Q9CQV7
RefSeq (mRNA)	NM_001190233; NM_145261; NM_201259; NM_201260; NM_201261	XM_003084719
RefSeq (protein)	NP_001177162; NP_660304	NP_001021382; NP_001273901; NP_001273902; NP_080608
Location (UCSC)	Chr 3: 180.98 – 180.99 Mb	n/a
PubMed search
- Wikidata
View/Edit Human	View/Edit Mouse

Mitochondrial import inner membrane translocase subunit TIM14 is an enzyme that in humans is encoded by the DNAJC19 gene on chromosome 3. TIM14 belongs to the DnaJ family, which has been involved in Hsp40/Hsp70 chaperone systems. As a mitochondrial chaperone, TIM14 functions as part of the TIM23 complex import motor to facilitate the import of nuclear-encoded proteins into the mitochondria. TIM14 also complexes with prohibitin complexes to regulate mitochondrial morphogenesis, and has been implicated in dilated cardiomyopathy with ataxia.

== Structure ==
The DNAJC19 gene is located on the q arm of chromosome 3 at position 26.33 and it spans 6,065 base pairs. The DNAJC19 gene produces a 6.29 kDa protein composed of 59 amino acids. The protein encoded by the DNAJC19 gene possesses an unusual structure compared to the rest of the DNAJ protein family. Notably, the DNAJ domain of TIM14 is located at the C-terminal rather than the N-terminal, and the transmembrane domain confers membrane-bound localization for TIM14 while other DNAJ proteins are cytosolic. TIM14 orthologs in other species, such as the yeast Tim14 and Mdj2p proteins, confirm localization to the mitochondrial inner membrane.

== Function ==
TIM14 is required for the ATP-dependent import of mitochondrial pre-proteins into the mitochondrial matrix. The J-domain of TIM14 stimulates mtHsp70 ATPase activity to power this transport.

Additionally, TIM14 helps regulate mitochondrial morphology by complexing with prohibitins to perform disphosphoglycerolipid cardiolipin (CL) remodeling. CL is a key phospholipid in mitochondrial membranes that modulates the fusion and fission of mitochondrial membranes, as well as mitophagy and apoptosis.

== Clinical significance ==
Defects in DNAJC19 have been observed primarily in cases of dilated cardiomyopathy with ataxia (DCMA), though it has also been associated with growth failure, microcytic anemia, and male genital anomalies. DNAJC19 was first implicated in DCMA in a study on the consanguineous Hutterite population, which has since been confirmed in other European populations. In the clinic, DNAJC19 mutations can be detected by screening for elevated levels of 3-methylglutaconic acid, mitochondrial distress, dilated cardiomyopathy, prolongation of the QT interval in the electrocardiogram, and cerebellar ataxia.

== Interactions ==
TIM14 interacts with:

- TIMM44,
- mtHsp70,
- TIMM16/PAM16, and
- PHB2.
