= DCMA =

DCMA may refer to:

- DCMA Collective, a US "lifestyle brand" clothing company
- DCMA syndrome, dilated cardiomyopathy with ataxia
- DC Metro Area, the region including Washington, DC, United States
- Defense Contract Management Agency, a U.S. agency
- Dhow Countries Music Academy, Zanzibar, Tanzania
- Don't Call Me Angel, a 2019 song by Ariana Grande, Miley Cyrus, and Lana Del Rey
- Dual channel memory architecture
- Durham Colliery Mechanics' Association, a former British trade union

== See also ==
- Digital Millennium Copyright Act (DMCA)
