= TIMM50 =

Protein-coding gene in the species Homo sapiens

Identifiers
- Aliases: TIMM50, TIM50, TIM50L, translocase of inner mitochondrial membrane 50, MGCA9
- External IDs: OMIM: 607381; MGI: 1913775; GeneCards: TIMM50

Gene location (Human)
| Chr. | Chromosome 19 (human) |
| Band | 19q13.2 | Start | 39,480,412 bp |
| Band | 19q13.2 | End | 39,493,785 bp |

Gene location (Mouse)
| Chr. | Chromosome 7 (mouse) |
| Band | 7|7 A3 | Start | 28,004,941 bp |
| Band | 7|7 A3 | End | 28,011,497 bp |
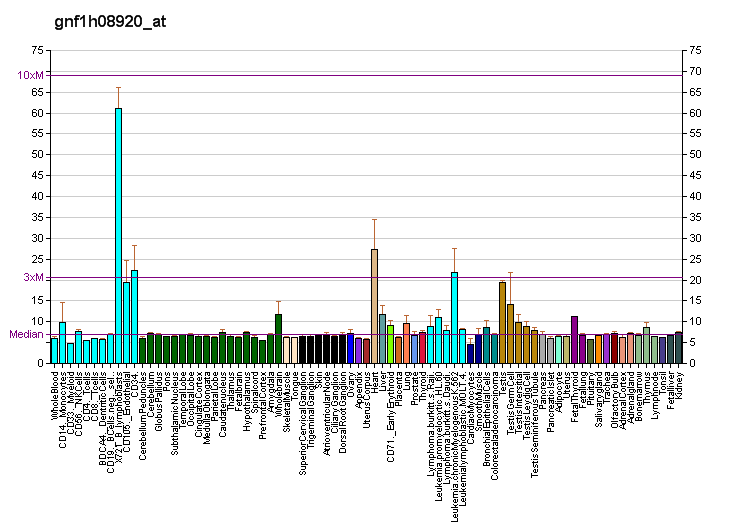

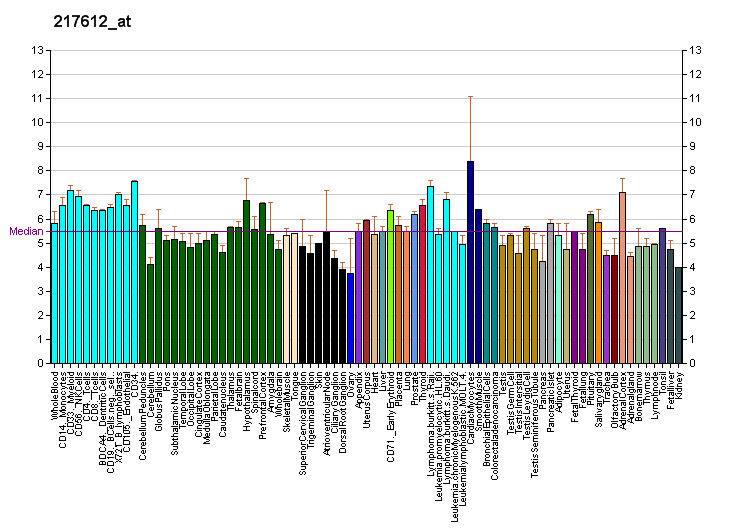
RNA expression pattern
| Bgee | Human / Mouse (ortholog); Top expressed in: left testis; right testis; apex of heart; muscle of thigh; right auricle of heart; gastrocnemius muscle; right lobe of thyroid gland; left ventricle; left lobe of thyroid gland; mucosa of transverse colon / Top expressed in: right kidney; epiblast; tail of embryo; embryo; neural tube; embryo; ventricular zone; yolk sac; interventricular septum; proximal tubule; More reference expression data |
| BioGPS | More reference expression data |
Gene ontology
| Molecular function | phosphoprotein phosphatase activity; protein serine/threonine phosphatase activity; interleukin-2 receptor binding; protein binding; RNA binding; protein tyrosine phosphatase activity; ribonucleoprotein complex binding |
| Cellular component | integral component of membrane; nuclear speck; membrane; TIM23 mitochondrial import inner membrane translocase complex; nucleoplasm; mitochondrion; mitochondrial inner membrane; nucleus |
| Biological process | protein dephosphorylation; protein import into mitochondrial matrix; protein transport; mitochondrial membrane organization; release of cytochrome c from mitochondria; peptidyl-tyrosine dephosphorylation |
Sources:Amigo / QuickGO
Orthologs
| Databases | NCBI: entry; OMA: entry |
| Species | Human | Mouse |
| Entrez | 92609 | 66525 |
| Ensembl | ENSG00000105197 | ENSMUSG00000003438 |
| UniProt | Q3ZCQ8 | Q9D880 |
| RefSeq (mRNA) | NM_001001563; NM_001329559 | NM_025616 |
| RefSeq (protein) | NP_001001563; NP_001316488; NP_001001563.1 | NP_079892 |
| Location (UCSC) | Chr 19: 39.48 – 39.49 Mb | Chr 7: 28 – 28.01 Mb |
| PubMed search |
- Wikidata
| View/Edit Human | View/Edit Mouse |

Mitochondrial import inner membrane translocase subunit TIM50 is a protein that in humans is encoded by the TIMM50 gene. Tim50 is a subunit of the Tim23 translocase complex in the inner mitochondrial membrane. Mutations in TIMM50 can lead to epilepsy, severe intellectual disability, and 3-methylglutaconic aciduria. TIMM50 expression is increased in breast cancer cells and decreased in hypertrophic hearts.

== Structure ==
The TIMM50 gene is located on the q arm of chromosome 19 in position 13.2 and spans 13,373 base pairs. The gene produces a 39.6 kDa protein composed of 353 amino acids. This gene encodes a subunit of the TIM23 inner mitochondrial membrane translocase complex, which mediates the translocation of transit peptide-containing proteins across the mitochondrial inner membrane.

== Function ==
The Tim50 protein functions as the receptor subunit that recognizes the mitochondrial targeting signal, or presequence, on protein cargo that is destined for the mitochondrial inner membrane and matrix. Knockdown of this gene in human cells results in the release of cytochrome c and apoptosis. This protein plays a role in maintaining the membrane permeability barrier. The intermembrane space domain of Tim50 induces the translocation pore of the TIM23 channel to close.

== Clinical significance ==
Missense mutations in TIMM50 often result in epilepsy or epileptic encephalopathy, severe intellectual disability, variable mitochondrial complex V deficiency, and 3-methylglutaconic aciduria, which is a key biomarker for mitochondrial membrane defects and mitochondrial dysfunction. Inheritance of TIMM50 is autosomal recessive. Expression of the TIMM50 gene is increased in breast cancer cells. In such cells, overexpression of the Tim50 protein is linked to lack of cellular apoptosis and increased rates of proliferation. Decreased TIMM50 expression in heart cells can lead to cardiac hypertrophy.

Two patients, male and female siblings born to consanguineous Bedouin parents were presented, displaying involuntary abnormal movements, failure to thrive, hypsarrhythmia, bilateral optic atrophy, 3-methylglutaconic aciduria, and slightly elevated plasma lactate levels. Both began walking independently at only 3 years and initially received favorably ACTH therapy until switching to a treatment of Valproate with either Sabril or Topamax, which resulted in seizures completely disappearing. Two more patients, male and female siblings born to first-cousin parents of Muslim origin were also presented, displaying myoclonic and tonic seizures, abnormal EEG, brain atrophy, delayed psychomotor development and 3-methylglutaconic aciduria. Treatment of Lamictal combined with Valproate was effective in controlling the seizures.

== Interactions ==
Within the TIM23 complex, the Tim50 subunit directly interacts with TIMM23. The TIM23 complex interacts with the TIMM44 component of the PAM complex and with DNAJC15. An isoform of Tim50 interacts with COIL and snRNPs.
