= PcrA =

PcrA, standing for plasmid copy reduced is a helicase that was originally discovered in a screen for chromosomally encoded genes that are affected in plasmid rolling circle replication in the Gram-positive pathogen Staphylococcus aureus.

== Biological functions ==
Genetic and biochemical studies have shown that the helicase is essential for plasmid rolling-circle replication and repair of DNA damage caused by exposure to ultraviolet radiation. It catalyzes the unwinding of double-stranded plasmid DNA that has been nicked at the replication origin by the replication initiation protein. Genetic and biochemical studies have also shown that the helicase plays an important role in cell-survival by regulating the levels of RecA-mediated recombination in Gram-positive bacteria.

== Biochemical properties ==
The helicase is a monomeric translocase and utilizes ATP to unwind DNA. The preferred substrates are single-stranded DNA containing 3' overhangs. The processivity of PcrA is increased in the presence of plasmid replication initiation protein.

== Crystal Structure ==
The structure of the helicase has been solved at high resolution and indicates "inchworming" as the mechanism of translocation on single-stranded DNA. A Mexican-wave model has been proposed based on the changes in conformation of the helicase observed in the product versus substrate complex.

== Classification ==
PcrA belongs to the SF1 superfamily of helicases, which also include the E. coli helicases UvrD and Rep and the eukaryotic helicase Srs2.

== Literature ==
- Iordanescu, S (Oct 1993). "Characterization of the Staphylococcus aureus chromosomal gene pcrA, identified by mutations affecting plasmid pT181 replication". Mol Gen Genet. 241 (1–2): 185–92. doi:10.1007/BF00280216. PMID 8232203. S2CID 685186.
- Petit, MA; Dervyn, E; Rose, M; Entian, KD; McGovern, S; Ehrlich, SD; Bruand, C (Jul 1998). "PcrA is an essential DNA helicase of Bacillus subtilis fulfilling functions both in repair and rolling-circle replication". Mol Microbiol. 29 (1): 261–73. doi:10.1046/j.1365-2958.1998.00927.x. PMID 9701819. S2CID 39193812.
- Petit, MA; Ehrlich, D (Jun 2002). "Essential bacterial helicases that counteract the toxicity of recombination proteins". EMBO J. 21 (12): 3137–47. doi:10.1093/emboj/cdf317. PMC 126070. PMID 12065426.
- Chang, TL; Naqvi, A; Anand, SP; Kramer, MG; Munshi, R; Khan, SA (Nov 2002). "Biochemical characterization of the Staphylococcus aureus PcrA helicase and its role in plasmid rolling circle replication". J Biol Chem. 277 (48): 45880–6. doi:10.1074/jbc.m207383200. PMID 12244110.
- Anand, SP; Zheng, H; Bianco, PR; Leuba, SH; Khan, SA (Jun 2007). "DNA helicase activity of PcrA is not required for the displacement of RecA protein from DNA or inhibition of RecA-mediated strand exchange". J Bacteriol. 189 (12): 4502–9. doi:10.1128/jb.00376-07. PMC 1913354. PMID 17449621.
- Soultanas, P; Dillingham, MS; Papadopoulos, F; Phillips, SE; Thomas, CD; Wigley, DB (Mar 1999). "Plasmid replication initiator protein RepD increases the processivity of PcrA DNA helicase". Nucleic Acids Res. 27 (6): 1421–8. doi:10.1093/nar/27.6.1421. PMC 148333. PMID 10037801.
- Velankar, SS; Soultanas, P; Dillingham, MS; Subramanya, HS; Wigley, DB (Apr 1999). "Crystal structures of complexes of PcrA DNA helicase with a DNA substrate indicate an inchworm mechanism". Cell. 97 (1): 75–84. doi:10.1016/s0092-8674(00)80716-3. PMID 10199404.
