= Translocase of the outer membrane =

Mitochondrial import receptor subunit TOM20
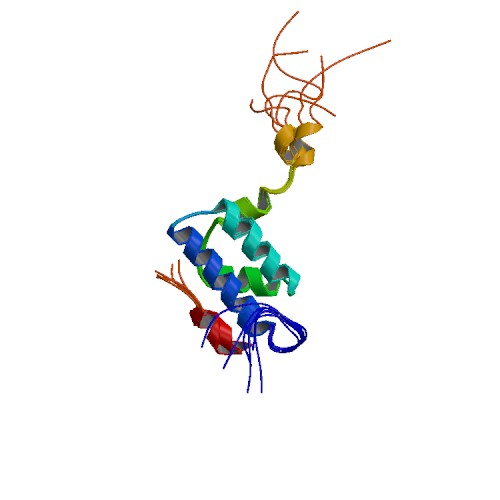

Identifiers
- Symbol: TOM20_plant
- Pfam: PF06552
- InterPro: IPR010547
- TCDB: 3.A.8
- OPM superfamily: 266
- OPM protein: 3awr
- Membranome: 170
Available protein structures:
- PDB: IPR010547 PF06552 (ECOD; PDBsum)
- AlphaFold: IPR010547; PF06552

TOM7 family

Identifiers
- Symbol: Tom7
- Pfam: PF08038
- InterPro: IPR012621
Available protein structures:
- PDB: IPR012621 PF08038 (ECOD; PDBsum)
- AlphaFold: IPR012621; PF08038

Mitochondrial import receptor subunit Tom22

Identifiers
- Symbol: Tom22
- Pfam: PF04281
- InterPro: IPR005683
- TCDB: 3.A.8
Available protein structures:
- PDB: IPR005683 PF04281 (ECOD; PDBsum)
- AlphaFold: IPR005683; PF04281

The translocase of the outer membrane (TOM) is a complex of proteins found in the outer mitochondrial membrane of the mitochondria. As a translocase, the TOM complex facilitates the movement of proteins across the outer membrane and into the intermembrane space of the mitochondrion. A major proportion of the proteins required for mitochondrial function are encoded by the nucleus of the cell; however, the outer membrane of the mitochondrion is impermeable to large molecules greater than 5000 daltons. The TOM complex works in conjunction with the translocase of the inner membrane (TIM) complex to translocate proteins into the mitochondrion. Many of the proteins within the TOM complex, such as TOMM22, were first identified in Neurospora crassa and Saccharomyces cerevisiae. Many of the genes encoding these proteins are designated as TOMM (translocase of the outer mitochondrial membrane) complex genes.

The complete mitochondrial protein translocase complex includes at least 19 proteins: several chaperones, four proteins of the outer membrane translocase (Tom) import receptor, five proteins of the Tom channel complex, five proteins of the inner membrane translocase (Tim) and three "motor" proteins.

== Protein targeting to the mitochondria ==
There are various mitochondrial import pathways that exist to facilitate the import of precursor proteins to their destined mitochondrial subcompartments. HSP90 aids the delivery of the mitochondrial preprotein to the TOM complex in an ATP-dependent process. Many precursor proteins (those that are destined for the matrix) contain amino-terminal presequences that carry information required for the targeting of proteins to the mitochondrial matrix These matrix targeting signals generally contain 10-80 amino acid residues that take on the conformation of an amphipathic-α helix and contain one positive and hydrophobic face. Once the precursor reaches the matrix, the presequence is typically cleaved off by the matrix processing peptidase. Proteins targeted to other sub-compartments of the mitochondria such as the intermembrane space and inner mitochondrial membrane, contain internal targeting signals, these signals have an indefinable nature and are inconsistent in their pattern. Proteins targeted to the outer membrane also contain internal targeting signals, not all of which have been identified, and include proteins that take on a β-barrel structure, such as Tom40. Some proteins however, that are targeted to the outer mitochondrial membrane contain a hydrophobic tail domain that anchors the protein to the membrane.

== Members of the complex ==
The translocase of the outer membrane (TOM) forms a complex made of Tom70, Tom22, and Tom20, along with Tom40, Tom7, Tom6, and Tom5. Tom20 and Tom22 are preprotein receptors, which are responsible for recognition of the cleavable presequence possessed by mitochondrial-targeted proteins. Tom70 is also a preprotein receptor and may recognise some cleavable presequence proteins, however it is mainly responsible for the recognition of non-cleavable preproteins and acts as a point for chaperone binding. Tom22 is anchored to the outer membrane by a single transmembrane segment and also plays a role in stabilizing the TOM complex. Tom40 is the core element of the translocase complex and complexes with Tom22 with a mass of approximately 350 kilodaltons. It forms the central protein-conducting channel with a diameter of approximately 2.5 nm. The human Tom22 is approximately 15.5 kilodaltons and complexes with Tom20. The N-terminal end of Tom22 extends into the cytosol and is involved in preprotein binding.

== Human proteins ==
TOMM22, TOMM40, TOM7, TOMM7

== See also ==
- Translocase of the inner membrane
- TOMM20
- TOMM22
- TOMM40
- TOMM70A
- Sorting and assembly machinery
