= Dilated cardiomyopathy with ataxia syndrome =

Dilated cardiomyopathy
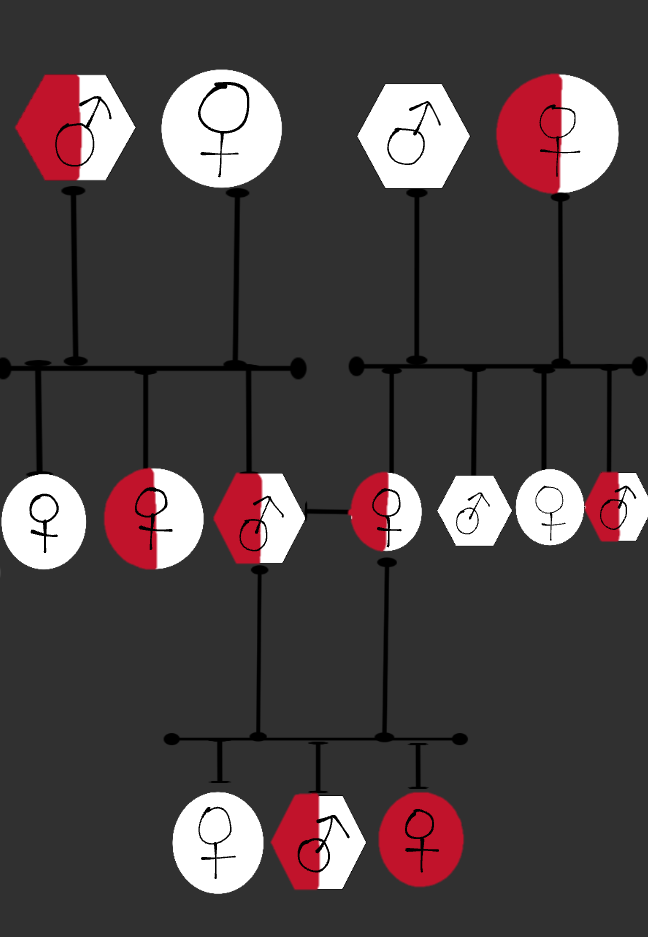
- Specialty: Medical genetics, Pediatry, Cardiology
- Symptoms: heart and movement problems
- Duration: life-long
- Causes: Genetic mutation
- Prevention: none
- Frequency: rare

Dilated cardiomyopathy with ataxia syndrome is a multi-systemic hereditary disorder that is characterized by heart abnormalities and problems with coordination, movement and balance.

== Presentation ==
Most people with DCMA begin developing dilated cardiomyopathy (weakening and enlargement of the heart) during their infancy into early childhood, at age 2, they start developing ataxia (difficulties with their coordination, balance, and movement), this causes a delay in the development of motor skills like walking

Some people with this disorder grow slowly pre- and post-natally, this results in short stature, they also might have heart problems like long QT syndrome, this condition causes arrhythmia, and this causes syncope (fainting), and cardiac arrests that might end with the affected person's life, most people with these symptoms die before their adolescence.

Other less common symptoms include intellectual disability, abnormal development of the genitals (in men), anemia, hepatic steatosis, and optic nerve atrophy.

== Causes ==
This syndrome is caused by autosomal recessive mutations in the DNAJC19 gene, in chromosome 3q26.33

== Epidemiology ==
This disorder is very rare, with only between 45-50 recorded in medical literature, something interesting to note is that, although reported across the world, most of these cases come from the Hutterite people, in Southern Alberta, Canada
