= Sorting and assembly machinery =

Protein complex in the outer mitochondrial membrane

The outer mitochondrial membrane is made up of two essential proteins, Tom40 and Sam50.

== Tom40 ==
Tom40 is a protein import pore required for the import of precursor proteins across the outer mitochondrial membrane, and it makes up part of the translocase of the outer membrane.

== Sam50 ==
Sam50 is a subunit of the sorting and assembly machinery (SAM) of the outer membrane.

The sorting and assembly machinery is a protein complex, that operates after the translocase of the outer membrane, to mediate insertion of beta barrel proteins into the outer mitochondrial membrane.

== Complex components ==
The sorting and assembly machinery is made up of three subunits, Sam35, Sam37, and Sam50, of which Sam50 is embedded within the outer mitochondrial membrane.

Both Sam35 and Sam37 are located on the cytosolic face of the SAM complex are peripheral membrane proteins that are not essential for survival.

Sam35 is believed to bind to substrate proteins, while Sam37 acts after Sam35 to stimulate release of the substrate protein from the SAM complex.

== Protein import and integration ==
The sorting and assembly machinery is required for the assembly of beta barrel proteins, this includes proteins such as the Tom40 import pore and porin.

Like all mitochondrial proteins, beta barrel proteins are transported into the intermembrane space of mitochondria via the translocase of the outer membrane.

Following import, beta barrel proteins are transported to the SAM complex by chaperone complexes, formed by assembly of the small Tim proteins.

The complex formed by the three sorting and assembly machinery subunits (SAM core complex), is responsible for the integration of beta barrel proteins into the outer mitochondrial membrane.

Mdm10 is another mitochondrial membrane protein, that is responsible for maintaining mitochondrial morphology and distribution. It has been found to interact with the SAM core complex, and may play a role in assembling Tom40 into the translocase of the outer membrane.
