= TIMM22 =

Protein-coding gene in the species Homo sapiens

Identifiers
- Aliases: TIMM22, TEX4, TIM22, translocase of inner mitochondrial membrane 22 homolog (yeast), translocase of inner mitochondrial membrane 22, COXPD43
- External IDs: OMIM: 607251; MGI: 1929742; GeneCards: TIMM22

Gene location (Human)
Chr.	Chromosome 17 (human)
Band	17p13.3	Start	997,129 bp
Band	17p13.3	End	1,003,671 bp

Gene location (Mouse)
Chr.	Chromosome 11 (mouse)
Band	11|11 B5	Start	76,297,778 bp
Band	11|11 B5	End	76,307,118 bp
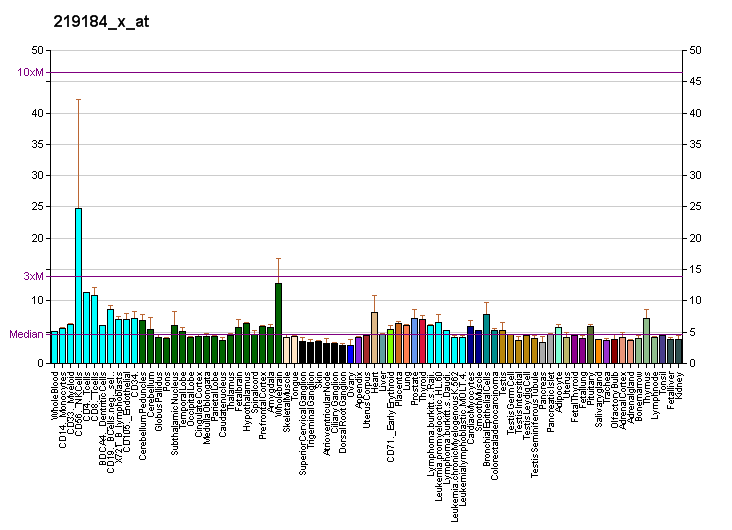
RNA expression pattern
Bgee	Human / Mouse (ortholog); Top expressed in: apex of heart; gonad; left ventricle; islet of Langerhans; gastrocnemius muscle; muscle of thigh; placenta; right auricle of heart; prefrontal cortex; stromal cell of endometrium / Top expressed in: morula; morula; facial motor nucleus; medial ganglionic eminence; endocardial cushion; neural tube; blastocyst; motor neuron; renal corpuscle; fossa; More reference expression data
BioGPS	More reference expression data
Gene ontology
Molecular function	mitochondrion targeting sequence binding; protein binding; protein transmembrane transporter activity
Cellular component	integral component of membrane; mitochondrial inner membrane; membrane; mitochondrion; TIM22 mitochondrial import inner membrane insertion complex
Biological process	protein transport; protein targeting to mitochondrion; protein insertion into mitochondrial inner membrane; protein transmembrane transport
Sources:Amigo / QuickGO
Orthologs
Databases	NCBI: entry; OMA: entry
Species	Human	Mouse
Entrez	29928	56322
Ensembl	ENSG00000277649; ENSG00000278501; ENSG00000177370	ENSMUSG00000020843
UniProt	Q9Y584	Q9CQ85
RefSeq (mRNA)	NM_013337	NM_001291161; NM_019818; NM_023355
RefSeq (protein)	NP_037469	NP_001278090; NP_062792; NP_075844
Location (UCSC)	Chr 17: 1 – 1 Mb	Chr 11: 76.3 – 76.31 Mb
PubMed search
- Wikidata
View/Edit Human	View/Edit Mouse

Mitochondrial import inner membrane translocase subunit Tim22 is an enzyme that in humans is encoded by the TIMM22 gene.

== See also ==
- Mitochondria Inner Membrane Translocase
- TIMM17A
- TIMM23
- TIMM44
