= TOMM70 =

Protein-coding gene in the species Homo sapiens

Identifiers
- Aliases: TOMM70, TOMM70A, Tom70, translocase of outer mitochondrial membrane 70
- External IDs: OMIM: 606081; MGI: 106295; GeneCards: TOMM70

Gene location (Human)
Chr.	Chromosome 3 (human)
Band	3q12.2	Start	100,363,431 bp
Band	3q12.2	End	100,401,089 bp

Gene location (Mouse)
Chr.	Chromosome 16 (mouse)
Band	16 C1.1|16 34.22 cM	Start	56,942,066 bp
Band	16 C1.1|16 34.22 cM	End	56,977,068 bp
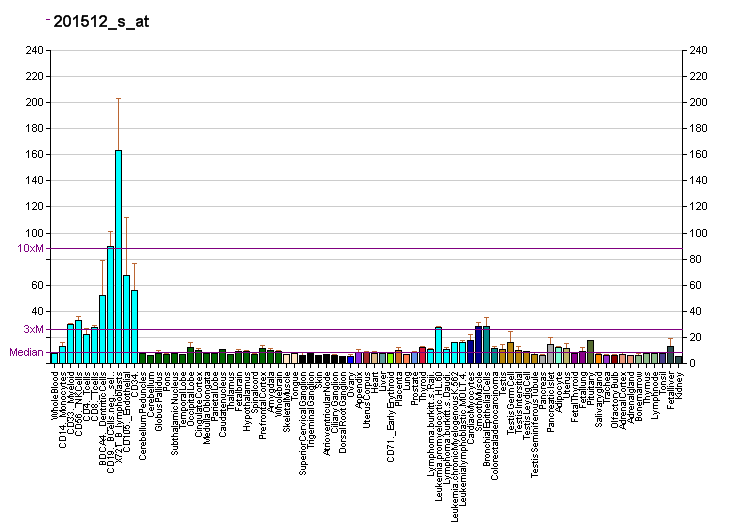

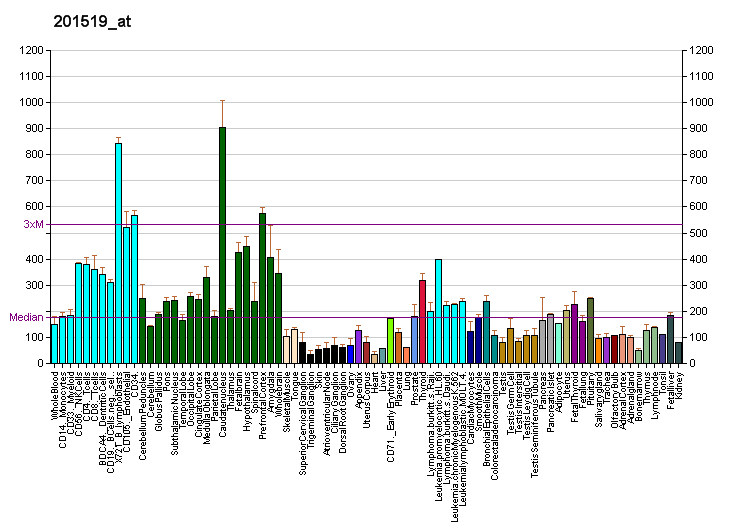
RNA expression pattern
Bgee	Human / Mouse (ortholog); Top expressed in: endothelial cell; glutes; Brodmann area 23; deltoid muscle; parotid gland; triceps brachii muscle; Skeletal muscle tissue of biceps brachii; Skeletal muscle tissue of rectus abdominis; Brodmann area 46; middle temporal gyrus / Top expressed in: nucleus accumbens; olfactory tubercle; medullary collecting duct; globus pallidus; cingulate gyrus; amygdala; dorsomedial hypothalamic nucleus; Paneth cell; renal corpuscle; Region I of hippocampus proper; More reference expression data
BioGPS	More reference expression data
Gene ontology
Molecular function	protein transmembrane transporter activity; protein binding
Cellular component	mitochondrial outer membrane; extracellular exosome; integral component of membrane; mitochondrial outer membrane translocase complex; membrane; mitochondrion
Biological process	macroautophagy; protein targeting to mitochondrion; protein transmembrane transport
Sources:Amigo / QuickGO
Orthologs
Databases	NCBI: entry; OMA: entry
Species	Human	Mouse
Entrez	9868	28185
Ensembl	ENSG00000154174	ENSMUSG00000022752
UniProt	O94826	Q9CZW5
RefSeq (mRNA)	NM_014820	NM_138599
RefSeq (protein)	NP_055635	NP_613065
Location (UCSC)	Chr 3: 100.36 – 100.4 Mb	Chr 16: 56.94 – 56.98 Mb
PubMed search
- Wikidata
View/Edit Human	View/Edit Mouse

Mitochondrial import receptor subunit TOM70, also known as translocase of outer mitochondrial membrane protein 70, is a protein that in humans is encoded by the TOMM70 gene.

The translocase of the outer mitochondrial membrane (TOM) complex is a multisubunit complex involved in the recognition, unfolding, and translocation of preproteins into the mitochondria. See TIM17A (MIM 605057).[supplied by OMIM]

== See also ==
- TOMM20
- TOMM22
- TOMM40
