= Translocase of the inner membrane =

Tim17/Tim22/Tim23 family

Identifiers
- Symbol: Tim17
- Pfam: PF02466
- InterPro: IPR003397
- TCDB: 3.A.8
- OPM superfamily: 266
- OPM protein: 3awr
- Membranome: 169
Available protein structures:
- PDB: IPR003397 PF02466 (ECOD; PDBsum)
- AlphaFold: IPR003397; PF02466

The translocase of the inner membrane (TIM) is a complex of proteins found in the inner membrane of the mitochondrion. Components of the TIM complex facilitate the translocation of proteins across the inner membrane and into the mitochondrial matrix. They also facilitate the insertion of proteins into the inner mitochondrial membrane, where they must reside in order to function, these mainly include members of the mitochondrial carrier family of proteins.

== The TIM23 complex ==
The TIM23 complex facilitates translocation of matrix-targeted proteins into the mitochondrial matrix. These proteins contain a cleavable presequence. The TIM23 complex is made up of the subunits Tim17, Tim21 and Tim23, which are thought to contribute to the structural formation of the translocation channel that spans the inner membrane, and Tim44, which is a peripheral membrane protein. Tim44 is only weakly associated with Tim23 and is located on the matrix side of the inner membrane. At the opening of the TIM17-23 complex, Tim44 recruits mitochondrial heat shock protein 70, which further mediates translocation of the precursor through ATP hydrolysis. Following protein entry into the matrix, the presequence is cleaved off by the matrix processing peptidase and the protein undergoes folding into an active conformation, facilitated by HSP60.

== The TIM22 complex ==
The TIM22 complex is responsible for mediating the integration of carrier preproteins into the inner membrane. Tim22, a subunit of the TIM22 complex, forms a channel within the inner membrane and is referred to as the carrier translocase. Tim54 and the small Tim proteins, Tim9, Tim10 and Tim12 also contribute to the TIM22 complex as well as Tim18. The function of Tim18 is not yet clear; however it is believed to play a role in assembly and stabilisation of the TIM22 complex, although is not involved in protein insertion into the membrane. Tim54, although it does not associate directly with Tim22, is also believed to assist in the stability of Tim22. Unlike cleavable preproteins, following translocation across the outer membrane via the translocase of the outer membrane, carrier preproteins are bound by the soluble Tim9-Tim10 complex of which the majority of this complex (~95%) is free floating within the intermembrane space. It is possible that this small Tim complex is able to stabilise precursor carrier proteins by acting as a chaperone and preventing the hydrophobic precursors from aggregating in the aqueous environment of the intermembrane space. A small portion of Tim9 and Tim10 (~5%) assembles into a modified complex containing Tim12, on the outer surface of the TIM22 complex. Tim12 is membrane bound and thus may act as a linker molecule docking Tim9 and Tim10 to the face of the TIM22 complex. The carrier preprotein is then inserted into the inner mitochondrial membrane in a potential-dependent fashion. The membrane potential is necessary for both insertion of the precursor into the carrier translocase and lateral release of the protein into the lipid phase of the inner mitochondrial membrane, which completes protein translocation. However this membrane potential-dependent process takes place in absence of ATP-driven machinery.

== Subfamilies ==
- Mitochondrial import inner membrane translocase, subunit TIMM17 InterPro: IPR005678
- Mitochondrial import inner membrane translocase, subunit TIMM23 InterPro: IPR005681

== Human proteins containing this domain ==
TIM17A; TIMM17A; TIMM17B; TIMM22; TIMM23;

== See also ==
- Mitochondria outer membrane translocase
- TIMM17A
- TIMM22
- TIMM23
- TIMM44
- Sorting and assembly machinery
