= TIMM23 =

Protein-coding gene in the species Homo sapiens

Identifiers
- Aliases: TIMM23, TIM23, translocase of inner mitochondrial membrane 23
- External IDs: OMIM: 605034; MGI: 1858317; GeneCards: TIMM23

Gene location (Human)
Chr.	Chromosome 10 (human)
Band	10q11.22	Start	45,972,489 bp
Band	10q11.22	End	46,003,742 bp

Gene location (Mouse)
Chr.	Chromosome 14 (mouse)
Band	14|14 B	Start	31,902,119 bp
Band	14|14 B	End	31,923,855 bp
RNA expression pattern
Bgee	Human / Mouse (ortholog); Top expressed in: gingival epithelium; Brodmann area 23; sperm; biceps brachii; right ventricle; Skeletal muscle tissue of biceps brachii; endothelial cell; secondary oocyte; vastus lateralis muscle; middle temporal gyrus / Top expressed in: morula; skeletal muscle tissue; quadriceps femoris muscle; yolk sac; blastocyst; muscle of thigh; heart; embryo; epiblast; right kidney; More reference expression data
BioGPS	n/a
Gene ontology
Molecular function	protein binding; protein-transporting ATPase activity; protein transmembrane transporter activity
Cellular component	mitochondrial inner membrane; integral component of membrane; mitochondrial intermembrane space; TIM23 mitochondrial import inner membrane translocase complex; mitochondrion; integral component of mitochondrial inner membrane; membrane
Biological process	protein transport; protein targeting to mitochondrion; protein import into mitochondrial matrix; intracellular protein transport
Sources:Amigo / QuickGO
Orthologs
Databases	NCBI: entry; OMA: entry
Species	Human	Mouse
Entrez	100287932	53600
Ensembl	ENSG00000265354	ENSMUSG00000013701
UniProt	O14925	Q9WTQ8
RefSeq (mRNA)	NM_006327	NM_016897
RefSeq (protein)	NP_006318	n/a
Location (UCSC)	Chr 10: 45.97 – 46 Mb	Chr 14: 31.9 – 31.92 Mb
PubMed search
- Wikidata
View/Edit Human	View/Edit Mouse

Mitochondrial import inner membrane translocase subunit Tim23 is an enzyme that in humans is encoded by the TIMM23 gene. This protein is part of the translocase of the inner membrane (TIM23) complex, which is involved in transporting protein across the inner mitochondrial membrane. In humans, the gene lies about 4 Mbp away from a poorly understood paralog called TIMM23B.

== See also ==
- TIMM17A
- TIMM22
- TIMM44
