= TOMM22 =

Protein-coding gene in the species Homo sapiens

Identifiers
- Aliases: TOMM22, 1C9-2, MST065, MSTP065, TOM22, translocase of outer mitochondrial membrane 22
- External IDs: OMIM: 607046; MGI: 2450248; GeneCards: TOMM22

Gene location (Human)
Chr.	Chromosome 22 (human)
Band	22q13.1	Start	38,681,957 bp
Band	22q13.1	End	38,685,421 bp

Gene location (Mouse)
Chr.	Chromosome 15 (mouse)
Band	15|15 E1	Start	79,555,062 bp
Band	15|15 E1	End	79,557,601 bp
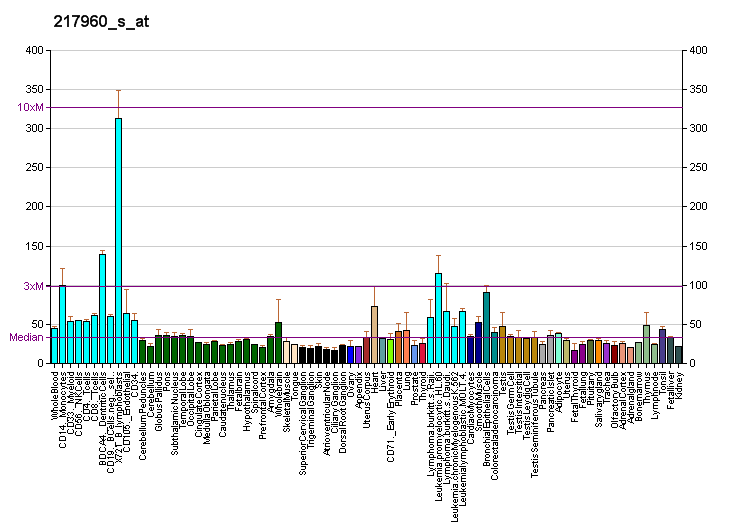
RNA expression pattern
Bgee	Human / Mouse (ortholog); Top expressed in: tendon of biceps brachii; mucosa of transverse colon; rectum; ganglionic eminence; internal globus pallidus; monocyte; muscle of thigh; apex of heart; prefrontal cortex; granulocyte / Top expressed in: spermatid; spermatocyte; morula; neural tube; epiblast; mesencephalon; ileum; ganglionic eminence; ventricular zone; embryo; More reference expression data
BioGPS	More reference expression data
Gene ontology
Molecular function	protein transmembrane transporter activity; protein binding
Cellular component	mitochondrial outer membrane translocase complex; integral component of membrane; mitochondrial inner membrane; mitochondrial outer membrane; integral component of mitochondrial outer membrane; membrane; mitochondrion
Biological process	protein transport; protein targeting to mitochondrion; protein import into mitochondrial matrix; intracellular protein transport; protein insertion into mitochondrial outer membrane; macroautophagy; transport; positive regulation of apoptotic process; protein insertion into mitochondrial membrane; protein transmembrane transport
Sources:Amigo / QuickGO
Orthologs
Databases	NCBI: entry; OMA: entry
Species	Human	Mouse
Entrez	56993	223696
Ensembl	ENSG00000100216	ENSMUSG00000022427
UniProt	Q9NS69	Q9CPQ3
RefSeq (mRNA)	NM_020243	NM_172609
RefSeq (protein)	NP_064628	NP_766197
Location (UCSC)	Chr 22: 38.68 – 38.69 Mb	Chr 15: 79.56 – 79.56 Mb
PubMed search
- Wikidata
View/Edit Human	View/Edit Mouse

Mitochondrial import receptor subunit TOM22 homolog (hTom22) is a protein that in humans is encoded by the TOMM22 gene.

The protein encoded by this gene is an integral membrane protein of the outer mitochondrial membrane. The encoded protein interacts with TOMM20 and TOMM40, and with other proteins forms a complex – the translocase of the outer membrane, to import cytosolic preproteins into the mitochondrion.

== See also ==
- TOMM20
- TOMM40
- TOMM70A
