= TOMM40 =

Protein-coding gene in the species Homo sapiens

Identifiers
- Aliases: TOMM40, C19orf1, D19S1177E, PER-EC1, PEREC1, TOM40, translocase of outer mitochondrial membrane 40
- External IDs: OMIM: 608061; MGI: 1858259; GeneCards: TOMM40

Gene location (Human)
| Chr. | Chromosome 19 (human) |
| Band | 19q13.32 | Start | 44,890,569 bp |
| Band | 19q13.32 | End | 44,903,689 bp |

Gene location (Mouse)
| Chr. | Chromosome 7 (mouse) |
| Band | 7|7 A3 | Start | 19,435,238 bp |
| Band | 7|7 A3 | End | 19,449,363 bp |
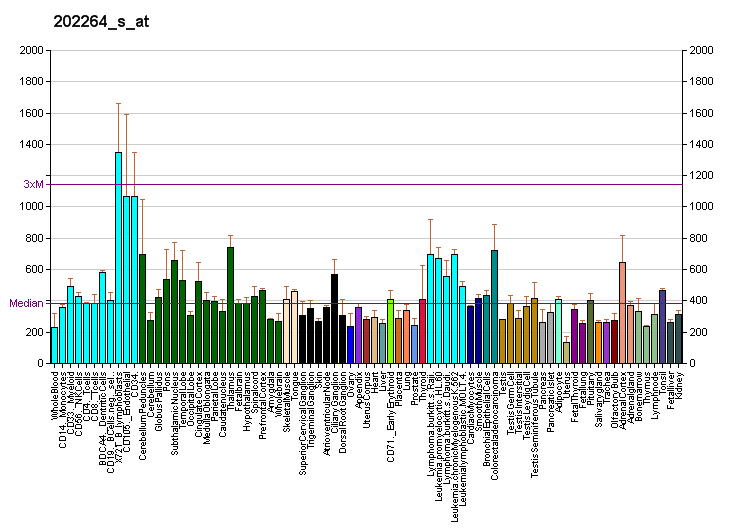
RNA expression pattern
| Bgee | Human / Mouse (ortholog); Top expressed in: olfactory bulb; beta cell; mucosa of transverse colon; right adrenal gland; left adrenal gland; left adrenal cortex; right adrenal cortex; tendon of biceps brachii; gastrocnemius muscle; apex of heart / Top expressed in: yolk sac; epiblast; embryo; somite; embryo; lip; right kidney; dentate gyrus of hippocampal formation granule cell; ventricular zone; superior frontal gyrus; More reference expression data |
| BioGPS | More reference expression data |
Gene ontology
| Molecular function | porin activity; protein binding; protein transmembrane transporter activity |
| Cellular component | integral component of membrane; membrane; mitochondrial outer membrane translocase complex; integral component of mitochondrial outer membrane; mitochondrial outer membrane; mitochondrion; pore complex; cytosol; mitochondrial inner membrane; cytoplasm; nucleoplasm |
| Biological process | ion transport; transmembrane transport; protein transport; protein targeting to mitochondrion; protein import into mitochondrial matrix; macroautophagy |
Sources:Amigo / QuickGO
Orthologs
| Databases | NCBI: entry; OMA: entry |
| Species | Human | Mouse |
| Entrez | 10452 | 53333 |
| Ensembl | ENSG00000130204 | ENSMUSG00000002984 |
| UniProt | O96008 | Q9QYA2 |
| RefSeq (mRNA) | NM_001128916; NM_001128917; NM_006114 | NM_001109748; NM_016871 |
| RefSeq (protein) | NP_001122388; NP_001122389; NP_006105; NP_001122388.1; NP_001122389.1 NP_006105.1 | NP_001103218; NP_058567 |
| Location (UCSC) | Chr 19: 44.89 – 44.9 Mb | Chr 7: 19.44 – 19.45 Mb |
| PubMed search |
- Wikidata
| View/Edit Human | View/Edit Mouse |

Mitochondrial import receptor subunit TOM40 homolog is a protein which in humans is encoded by the TOMM40 gene.

== Function ==
TOMM40 codes for a protein that is embedded into outer membranes of mitochondria and is required for the movement of proteins into mitochondria. More precisely, TOMM40 is the channel-forming subunit of the translocase of the outer membrane (TOM) complex, a translocase of the outer mitochondrial membrane that is essential for protein transport into the mitochondrion.

== Clinical significance ==
Certain alleles of this gene have been statistically associated with an increased risk of developing late-onset Alzheimer's disease. One study has found that TOMM40 risk alleles appear twice as often in people with Alzheimer's disease than those without it. Because TOMM40 is located on chromosome 19, and is closely adjacent to APOE, another gene known to be associated with Alzheimer's, another study has suggested that the statistically significant correlation of TOMM40 with Alzheimer's is due to linkage disequilibrium.

== See also ==
- TOMM20
- TOMM22
- TOMM70A
