= TIMM9 =

Protein-coding gene in the species Homo sapiens

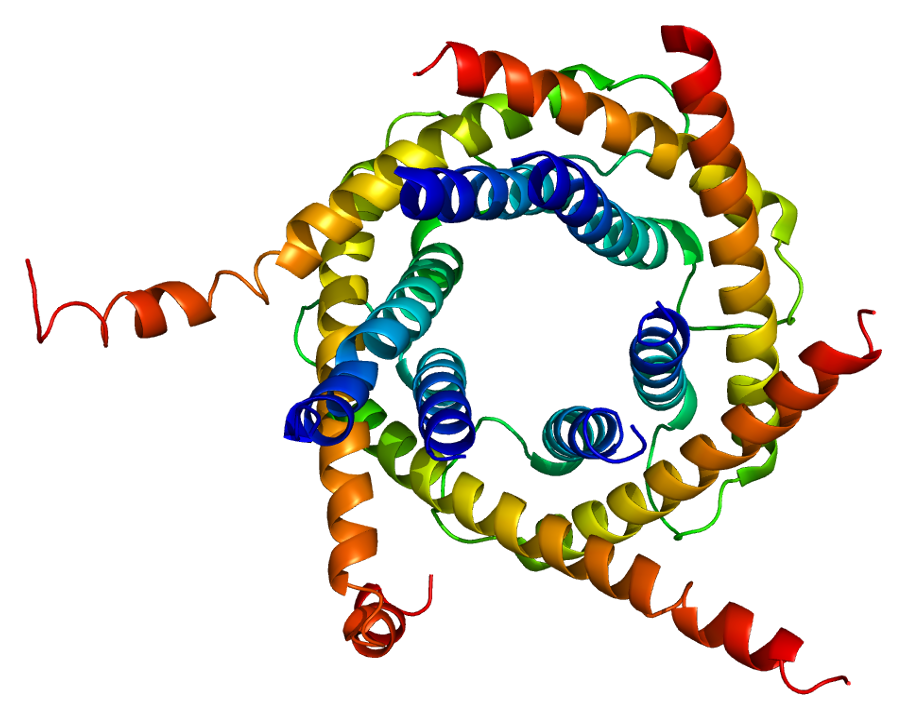

Identifiers
- Aliases: TIMM9, TIM9, TIM9A, translocase of inner mitochondrial membrane 9
- External IDs: OMIM: 607384; MGI: 1353436; GeneCards: TIMM9
Available structures
PDB	Ortholog search: PDBe RCSB
PDB	List of PDB id codes 2BSK

Gene location (Human)
Chr.	Chromosome 14 (human)
Band	14q23.1	Start	58,408,495 bp
Band	14q23.1	End	58,427,531 bp

Gene location (Mouse)
Chr.	Chromosome 12 (mouse)
Band	12 C2|12	Start	71,169,947 bp
Band	12 C2|12	End	71,183,458 bp
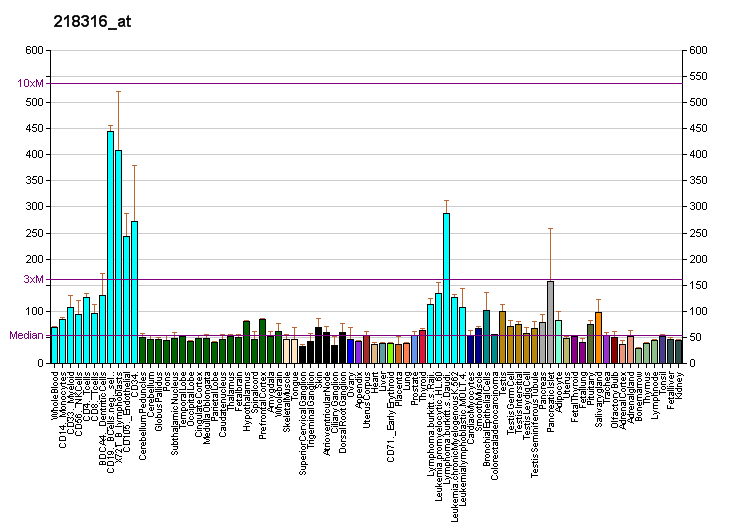
RNA expression pattern
Bgee	Human / Mouse (ortholog); Top expressed in: body of pancreas; ganglionic eminence; muscle of thigh; epithelium of colon; ventricular zone; gastrocnemius muscle; left ovary; gonad; muscle layer of sigmoid colon; right ovary / Top expressed in: primary oocyte; right kidney; embryo; secondary oocyte; embryo; blastocyst; proximal tubule; yolk sac; dentate gyrus of hippocampal formation granule cell; superior frontal gyrus; More reference expression data
BioGPS	More reference expression data
Gene ontology
Molecular function	zinc ion binding; chaperone binding; protein binding; protein homodimerization activity; metal ion binding; transporter activity
Cellular component	mitochondrial inner membrane; mitochondrial intermembrane space; mitochondrial intermembrane space protein transporter complex; membrane; mitochondrion; TIM22 mitochondrial import inner membrane insertion complex
Biological process	protein transport; protein insertion into mitochondrial inner membrane; protein targeting to mitochondrion; hearing
Sources:Amigo / QuickGO
Orthologs
Databases	NCBI: entry; OMA: entry
Species	Human	Mouse
Entrez	26520	30056
Ensembl	ENSG00000100575	ENSMUSG00000021079
UniProt	Q9Y5J7	Q9WV98
RefSeq (mRNA)	NM_001304485; NM_001304486; NM_001304487; NM_001304488; NM_001304489 NM_001304490; NM_001304491; NM_012460	NM_001024853; NM_001024854; NM_001286203; NM_013896
RefSeq (protein)	NP_001291414; NP_001291415; NP_001291416; NP_001291417; NP_001291418 NP_001291419; NP_001291420; NP_036592	NP_001020024; NP_001020025; NP_001273132; NP_038924
Location (UCSC)	Chr 14: 58.41 – 58.43 Mb	Chr 12: 71.17 – 71.18 Mb
PubMed search
- Wikidata
View/Edit Human	View/Edit Mouse

Mitochondrial import inner membrane translocase subunit Tim9 is an enzyme that in humans is encoded by the TIMM9 gene.

TIMM9 belongs to a family of evolutionarily conserved proteins that are organized in heterooligomeric complexes in the mitochondrial intermembrane space.

These proteins mediate the import and insertion of hydrophobic membrane proteins into the mitochondrial inner membrane.[supplied by OMIM]
