= TOMM20 =

Protein-coding gene in humans

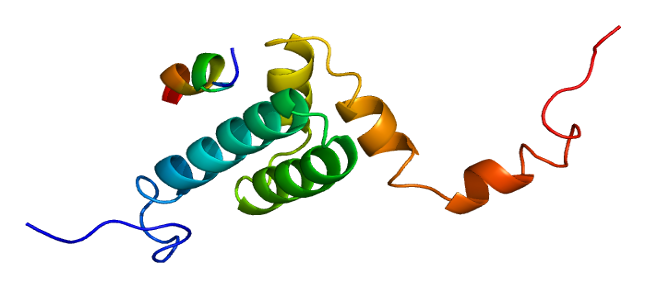

Identifiers
- Aliases: TOMM20, MAS20, MOM19, TOM20, translocase of outer mitochondrial membrane 20
- External IDs: OMIM: 601848; MGI: 1915202; GeneCards: TOMM20
Available structures
PDB	Ortholog search: PDBe RCSB
PDB	List of PDB id codes 4APO

Gene location (Human)
Chr.	Chromosome 1 (human)
Band	1q42.3	Start	235,109,341 bp
Band	1q42.3	End	235,128,837 bp

Gene location (Mouse)
Chr.	Chromosome 8 (mouse)
Band	8|8 E2	Start	127,657,417 bp
Band	8|8 E2	End	127,672,594 bp
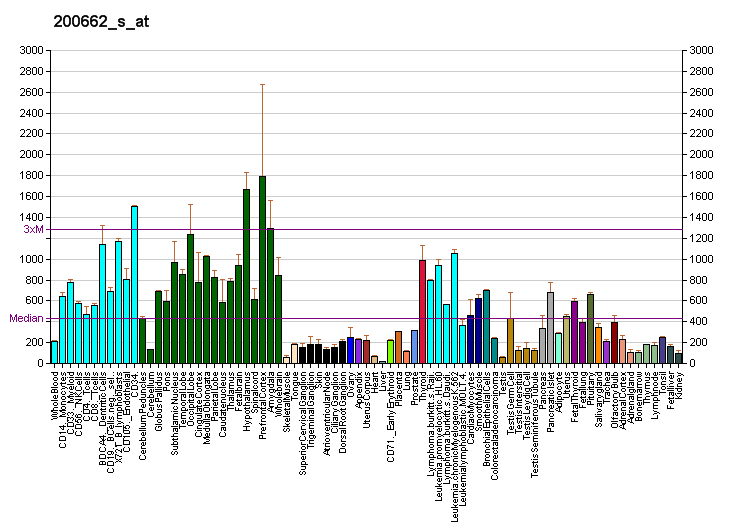
RNA expression pattern
Bgee	Human / Mouse (ortholog); Top expressed in: parotid gland; skin of thigh; Brodmann area 10; frontal pole; skin of hip; middle frontal gyrus; caput epididymis; lateral nuclear group of thalamus; corpus epididymis; pons / Top expressed in: yolk sac; embryo; embryo; olfactory tubercle; nucleus accumbens; superior frontal gyrus; subiculum; ventromedial nucleus; temporal lobe; dentate gyrus of hippocampal formation granule cell; More reference expression data
BioGPS	More reference expression data
Gene ontology
Molecular function	protein-transporting ATPase activity; protein binding; mitochondrion targeting sequence binding; unfolded protein binding; protein transmembrane transporter activity
Cellular component	integral component of membrane; mitochondria associated membranes; membrane; mitochondrial outer membrane translocase complex; integral component of mitochondrial outer membrane; mitochondrial outer membrane; mitochondrion; mitochondrial envelope
Biological process	protein targeting; tRNA import into mitochondrion; mitochondrial outer membrane translocase complex assembly; protein import into mitochondrial matrix; protein transport; intracellular protein transport; protein targeting to mitochondrion; protein deubiquitination; response to muscle activity; response to 3,3',5-triiodo-L-thyronine; macroautophagy
Sources:Amigo / QuickGO
Orthologs
Databases	NCBI: entry; OMA: entry
Species	Human	Mouse
Entrez	9804	67952
Ensembl	ENSG00000173726	ENSMUSG00000093904
UniProt	Q15388	Q9DCC8
RefSeq (mRNA)	NM_014765	NM_024214
RefSeq (protein)	NP_055580; NP_055580.1	NP_077176
Location (UCSC)	Chr 1: 235.11 – 235.13 Mb	Chr 8: 127.66 – 127.67 Mb
PubMed search
- Wikidata
View/Edit Human	View/Edit Mouse

Mitochondrial import receptor subunit TOM20 homolog is a protein encoded by the TOMM20 gene in humans. TOM20 functions as part of the receptor systems within the translocase of the outer membrane (TOM) complex in the outer mitochondrial membrane.

== Function ==
In mitochondrial protein import, TOM20 is closely associated with the pore-forming TOM40 complex and acts by recognizing and binding the N-terminal MTSs (matrix-targeting sequences), which form an amphipathic alpha helix and aid passage of the target proteins into the mitochondrial matrix.

== See also ==
- TOMM22
- TOMM40
- TOMM70A
