= TIMM10 =

Protein-coding gene in the species Homo sapiens

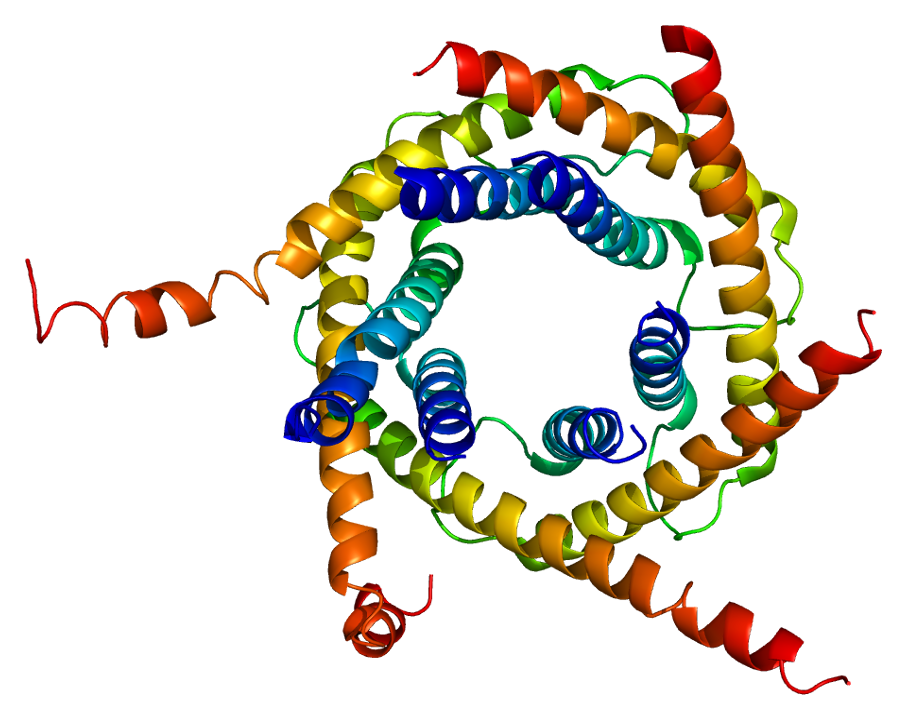

Identifiers
- Aliases: TIMM10, TIM10, TIM10A, translocase of inner mitochondrial membrane 10 homolog (yeast), translocase of inner mitochondrial membrane 10, TIMM10A
- External IDs: OMIM: 602251; MGI: 1353429; GeneCards: TIMM10
Available structures
PDB	Ortholog search: PDBe RCSB
PDB	List of PDB id codes 2BSK

Gene location (Human)
Chr.	Chromosome 11 (human)
Band	11q12.1	Start	57,528,464 bp
Band	11q12.1	End	57,530,803 bp

Gene location (Mouse)
Chr.	Chromosome 2 (mouse)
Band	2|2 D	Start	84,657,341 bp
Band	2|2 D	End	84,660,557 bp
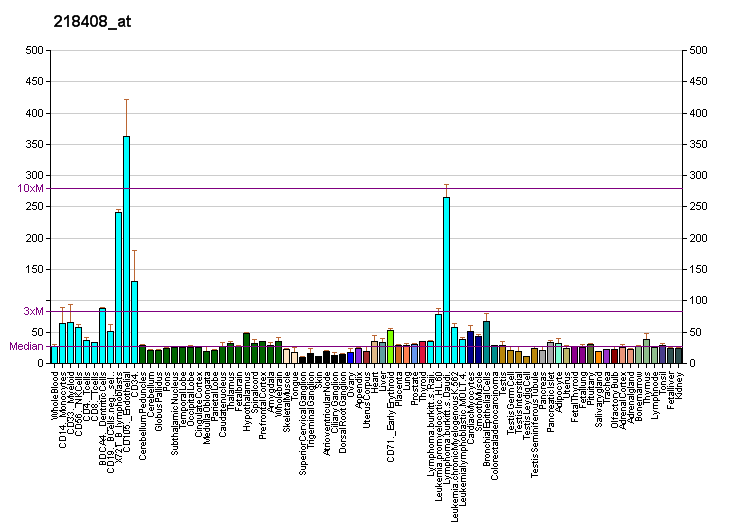
RNA expression pattern
Bgee	Human / Mouse (ortholog); Top expressed in: gingival epithelium; prefrontal cortex; muscle of thigh; islet of Langerhans; gastrocnemius muscle; anterior cingulate cortex; apex of heart; tendon of biceps brachii; right lobe of liver; biceps brachii / Top expressed in: facial motor nucleus; myocardium of ventricle; right ventricle; morula; endocardial cushion; atrioventricular valve; digastric muscle; embryo; soleus muscle; cardiac muscles; More reference expression data
BioGPS	More reference expression data
Gene ontology
Molecular function	zinc ion binding; chaperone binding; protein binding; protein homodimerization activity; metal ion binding; transporter activity
Cellular component	mitochondrial inner membrane; mitochondrial intermembrane space; TIM23 mitochondrial import inner membrane translocase complex; mitochondrial intermembrane space protein transporter complex; membrane; mitochondrion; TIM22 mitochondrial import inner membrane insertion complex
Biological process	protein transport; protein insertion into mitochondrial inner membrane; protein targeting to mitochondrion; hearing
Sources:Amigo / QuickGO
Orthologs
Databases	NCBI: entry; OMA: entry
Species	Human	Mouse
Entrez	26519	30059
Ensembl	ENSG00000134809	ENSMUSG00000027076
UniProt	P62072	P62073
RefSeq (mRNA)	NM_012456	NM_013899
RefSeq (protein)	NP_036588	NP_038927
Location (UCSC)	Chr 11: 57.53 – 57.53 Mb	Chr 2: 84.66 – 84.66 Mb
PubMed search
- Wikidata
View/Edit Human	View/Edit Mouse

Mitochondrial import inner membrane translocase subunit Tim10 is an enzyme that in humans is encoded by the TIMM10 gene.

TIMM10 belongs to a family of evolutionarily conserved proteins that are organized in heterooligomeric complexes in the mitochondrial intermembrane space. These proteins mediate the import and insertion of hydrophobic membrane proteins into the mitochondrial inner membrane.[supplied by OMIM]
