= TIMM44 =

Protein-coding gene in the species Homo sapiens

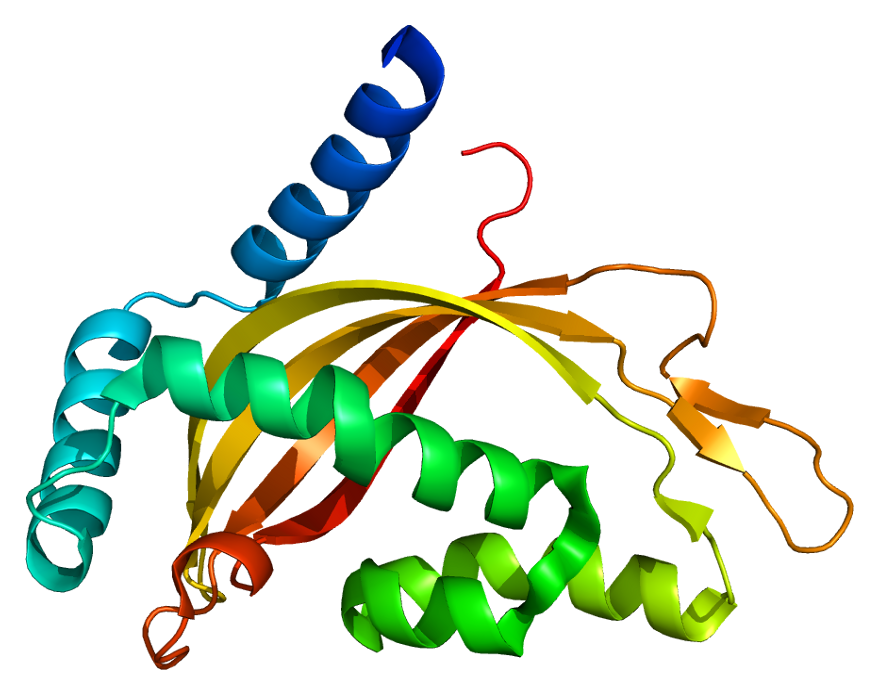

Identifiers
- Aliases: TIMM44, TIM44, translocase of inner mitochondrial membrane 44
- External IDs: OMIM: 605058; MGI: 1343262; GeneCards: TIMM44
Available structures
PDB	Ortholog search: PDBe RCSB
PDB	List of PDB id codes 2CW9

Gene location (Human)
Chr.	Chromosome 19 (human)
Band	19p13.2	Start	7,926,718 bp
Band	19p13.2	End	7,943,667 bp

Gene location (Mouse)
Chr.	Chromosome 8 (mouse)
Band	8 A1.1|8 1.99 cM	Start	4,309,731 bp
Band	8 A1.1|8 1.99 cM	End	4,325,913 bp
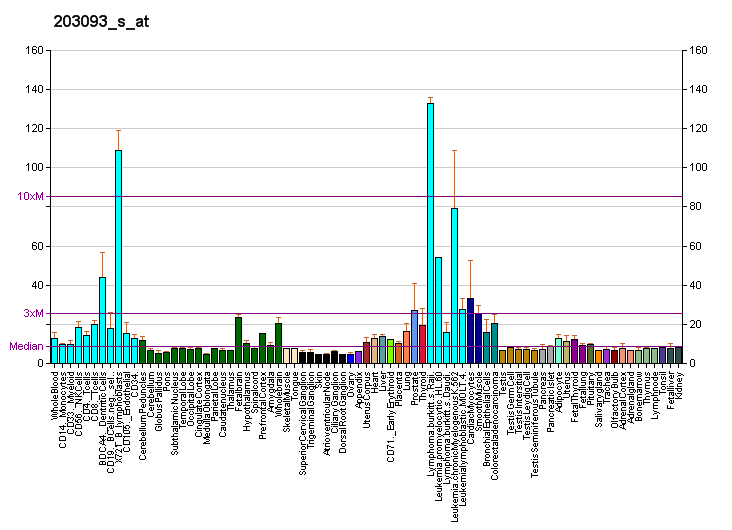

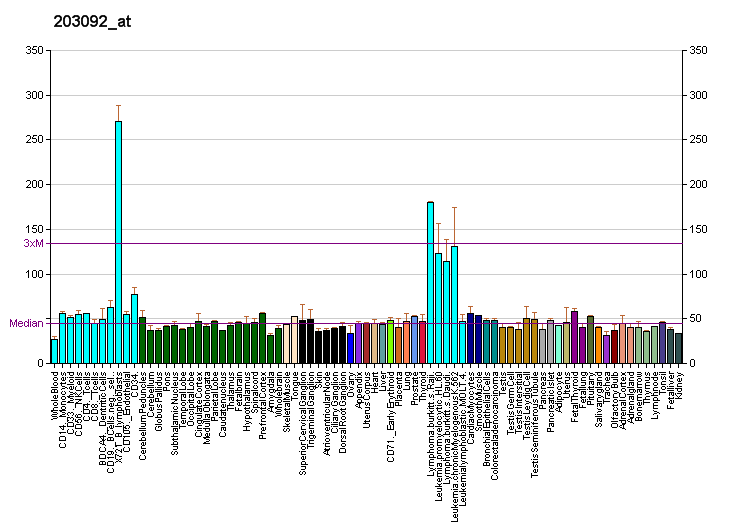
RNA expression pattern
Bgee	Human / Mouse (ortholog); Top expressed in: apex of heart; gastrocnemius muscle; right hemisphere of cerebellum; muscle layer of sigmoid colon; body of uterus; left ventricle; right ovary; left ovary; canal of the cervix; gastric mucosa / Top expressed in: ciliary body; retinal pigment epithelium; right ventricle; neural layer of retina; sternocleidomastoid muscle; digastric muscle; temporal muscle; brown adipose tissue; internal carotid artery; iris; More reference expression data
BioGPS	More reference expression data
Gene ontology
Molecular function	nucleotide binding; chaperone binding; protein binding; ATP binding
Cellular component	mitochondrial inner membrane; membrane; mitochondrion; mitochondrial matrix
Biological process	protein transport; protein targeting to mitochondrion; protein import into mitochondrial matrix
Sources:Amigo / QuickGO
Orthologs
Databases	NCBI: entry; OMA: entry
Species	Human	Mouse
Entrez	10469	21856
Ensembl	ENSG00000104980	ENSMUSG00000002949
UniProt	O43615	O35857
RefSeq (mRNA)	NM_006351	NM_011592
RefSeq (protein)	NP_006342	NP_035722
Location (UCSC)	Chr 19: 7.93 – 7.94 Mb	Chr 8: 4.31 – 4.33 Mb
PubMed search
- Wikidata
View/Edit Human	View/Edit Mouse

Mitochondrial import inner membrane translocase subunit TIM44 is an enzyme that in humans is encoded by the TIMM44 gene.

== Interactions ==
TIMM44 has been shown to interact with ARAF.

== See also ==
- Mitochondria Inner Membrane Translocase
- TIMM17A
- TIMM22
- TIMM23
