= HSPA9 =

Protein-coding gene in the species Homo sapiens

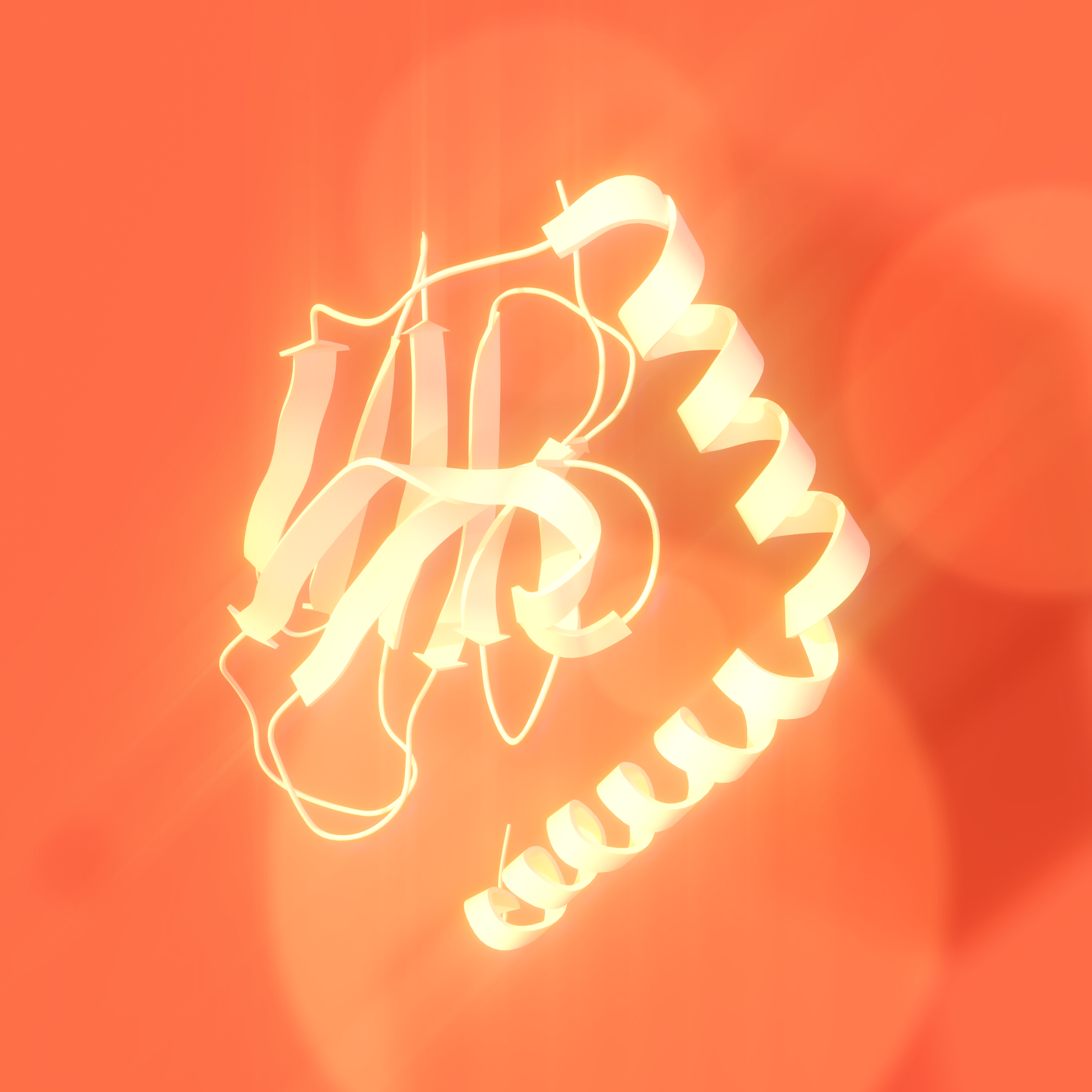

Identifiers
- Aliases: HSPA9, CSA, GRP-75, GRP75, HEL-S-124m, HSPA9B, MOT, MOT2, MTHSP75, PBP74, CRP40, EVPLS, SAAN, SIDBA4, heat shock protein family A (Hsp70) member 9
- External IDs: OMIM: 600548; MGI: 96245; GeneCards: HSPA9
Available structures
| PDB | Ortholog search: PDBe RCSB |
| PDB | List of PDB id codes 3N8E, 4KBO |
Enzyme activity
| EC # | BRENDA | ExPASy | KEGG | MetaCyc |
|---|---|---|---|---|
| 3.6.4.10 | ↗ | ↗ | ↗ | ↗ |

Gene location (Human)
| Chr. | Chromosome 5 (human) |
| Band | 5q31.2 | Start | 138,553,756 bp |
| Band | 5q31.2 | End | 138,575,675 bp |

Gene location (Mouse)
| Chr. | Chromosome 18 (mouse) |
| Band | 18 B1|18 18.8 cM | Start | 35,070,467 bp |
| Band | 18 B1|18 18.8 cM | End | 35,087,410 bp |
RNA expression pattern
| Bgee | Human / Mouse (ortholog); Top expressed in: right adrenal gland; right adrenal cortex; left adrenal gland; left adrenal cortex; epithelium of colon; muscle of thigh; ventricular zone; Achilles tendon; gastrocnemius muscle; islet of Langerhans / Top expressed in: Ileal epithelium; primitive streak; Paneth cell; endothelial cell of lymphatic vessel; right kidney; epiblast; medullary collecting duct; interventricular septum; muscle of thigh; adrenal gland; More reference expression data |
| BioGPS | n/a |
Gene ontology
| Molecular function | nucleotide binding; unfolded protein binding; protein binding; ATP binding; ubiquitin protein ligase binding; RNA binding; ATPase activity; heat shock protein binding; protein folding chaperone activity; misfolded protein binding; enzyme binding |
| Cellular component | cytoplasm; focal adhesion; nucleolus; mitochondrion; mitochondrial nucleoid; extracellular exosome; nucleus; extracellular matrix; mitochondrial matrix |
| Biological process | negative regulation of apoptotic process; protein folding; negative regulation of erythrocyte differentiation; erythrocyte differentiation; interleukin-12-mediated signaling pathway; response to unfolded protein; iron-sulfur cluster assembly; cellular response to heat; Unfolded Protein Response; protein refolding; regulation of erythrocyte differentiation; chaperone cofactor-dependent protein refolding; protein export from nucleus; negative regulation of hematopoietic stem cell differentiation; negative regulation of hemopoiesis |
Sources:Amigo / QuickGO
Orthologs
| Databases | NCBI: entry; OMA: entry |
| Species | Human | Mouse |
| Entrez | 3313 | 15526 |
| Ensembl | ENSG00000113013 | ENSMUSG00000024359 |
| UniProt | P38646 | P38647 |
| RefSeq (mRNA) | NM_004134 | NM_010481 |
| RefSeq (protein) | NP_004125 | NP_034611 |
| Location (UCSC) | Chr 5: 138.55 – 138.58 Mb | Chr 18: 35.07 – 35.09 Mb |
| PubMed search |
- Wikidata
| View/Edit Human | View/Edit Mouse |

Mitochondrial 70kDa heat shock protein (mtHsp70), also known as mortalin, is a protein that in humans is encoded by the HSPA9 gene.

== Function ==
The product encoded by this gene belongs to the heat shock protein 70 family which contains both heat-inducible and constitutively expressed members. The latter are called heat-shock cognate proteins. This gene encodes a heat-shock cognate protein. This protein plays a role in the control of cell proliferation. It may also act as a chaperone.

== Interactions ==
HSPA9 has been shown to interact with FGF1 and P53.

== Clinical relevance and genetic deficiency ==
In 2015, a group around Andrea Superti-Furga showed that biallelic variants in the HSPA9 gene may result in a combination of congenital malformations called the EVEN-PLUS syndrome. These genetic variants have been shown to interfere with normal HSPA9 function
