= Intermembrane space =

Part of a cell

Simplified structure of a mitochondrion

An intermembrane space refers to the region of space which occurs between two or more adjacent plasma membranes within a given cellular organelle. Most commonly, the intermembrane space (IMS) describes the narrow region that separates the inner mitochondrial membrane from the outer mitochondrial membrane within a mitochondrion, or for that of the analogous membrane structures within a chloroplast. Similarly, an intermembrane space separates the inner and outer nuclear membranes within the nuclear envelope; however, this region is frequently referred to as the perinuclear space. The IMS of mitochondria is crucial for the coordination of a variety of cellular activities, such as the regulation of cellular respiration and other metabolic functions.

== Intermembrane space of mitochondria ==
Mitochondria are surrounded by two membranes; the inner and outer mitochondrial membranes. These two membranes allow the formation of two aqueous compartments, which are the intermembrane space (IMS) and the matrix. Channel proteins called porins in the outer membrane allow free diffusion of ions and small proteins about 5000 daltons or less into the IMS. This makes the IMS chemically equivalent to the cytosol regarding the small molecules it contains. By contrast, specific transport proteins are required to transport ions and other small molecules across the inner mitochondrial membrane into the matrix due to its impermeability. The IMS also contains many enzymes that use the ATP moving out of the matrix to phosphorylate other nucleotides and proteins that initiate apoptosis.

=== Translocation ===
Most of proteins destined for the mitochondrial matrix are synthesized as precursors in the cytosol and are imported into the mitochondria by the translocase of the outer membrane (TOM) and the translocase of the inner membrane (TIM). The IMS is involved in the mitochondrial protein translocation. The precursor proteins called small TIM chaperones which are hexameric complexes are located in the IMS and they bind hydrophobic precursor proteins and delivery the precursors to the TIM.

Electron transport chain and intermembrane space of a mitochondrion

=== Oxidative phosphorylation ===
The pyruvate generated by glycolysis and the fatty acids produced by breakdown of fats enter the mitochondrial IMS through the porins in the outer mitochondrial membrane. Then they are transported across the inner mitochondrial membrane into the matrix and converted into the acetyl CoA to enter the citric acid cycle.

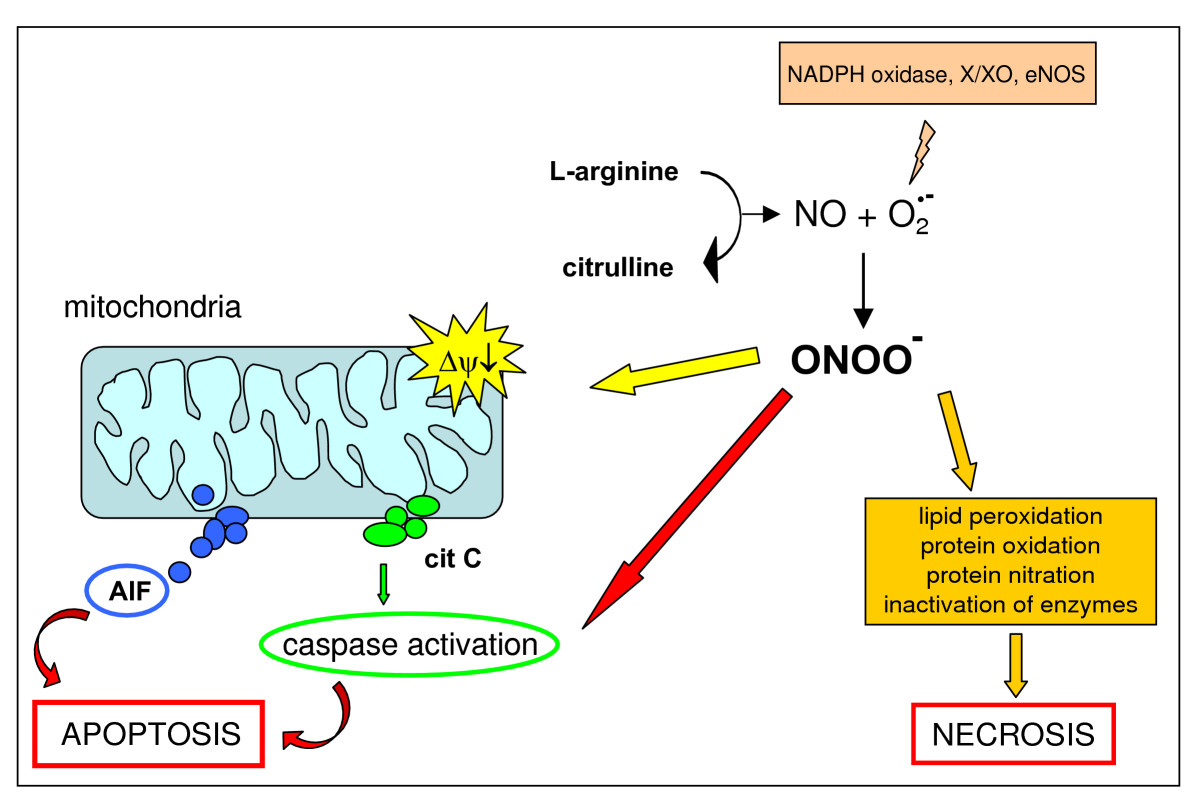
Apoptotic components released from the intermembrane space of a mitochondrion

The respiratory chain in the inner mitochondrial membrane carries out oxidative phosphorylation. Three enzyme complexes are responsible for the electron transport: NADH-ubiquinone oxidoreductase complex (complex I), ubiquinone-cytochrome c oxidoreductase complex (complex III), and cytochrome c oxidase (complex IV). The protons are pumped from the mitochondrial matrix to the IMS by these respiratory complexes. As a result, an electrochemical gradient is generated, which is combined by forces due to a H^{+} gradient (pH gradient) and a voltage gradient (membrane potential). The pH in the IMS is about 0.7 unit lower than the one in the matrix and the membrane potential of the IMS side becomes more positively charged than the matrix side. This electrochemical gradient from the IMS to the matrix is used to drive the synthesis of ATP in the mitochondria.

=== Apoptosis ===
Releasing of cytochrome c from the IMS to the cytosol activates procaspases and triggers a caspase cascade leading to apoptosis.

== Intermembrane space of chloroplasts ==
Simplified structure of a chloroplast

The intermembrane space (IMS) of the chloroplast is exceedingly small, from 10 to 20 nm thick. Unlike the IMS of the mitochondria, the IMS of the chloroplast does not seem to have any obvious function. The translocase of the outer membrane (TOC) and the translocase of the inner membrane (TIC) mainly assist the translocation of chloroplast precursor proteins Chaperone involvement in the IMS has been proposed but still remains uncertain. The eukaryotic Hsp70, which is the heat shock protein of 70 kDa, typically localized in the cytoplasm is also found in the IMS of chloroplasts. The resulting hypothesis states that co-localization of Hsp70 is important for efficient translocation of protein precursors into and across the IMS of chloroplasts.

== Intermembrane space of nuclear envelopes ==
Simplified structure of a eukaryotic cell nucleus

The nuclear envelope is composed of two lipid bilayer membranes that are penetrated by nuclear pores and separated by a small intermembrane space, which is often called the perinuclear space. The perinuclear space is usually about 20-40 nm wide. The perinuclear translocation of certain proteins and enzymes were studied and results showed that perinuclear space was important for genome integrity and gene regulation.
