= TIMM17A =

Protein-coding gene in humans

Identifiers
- Aliases: TIMM17A, TIM17, TIM17A, translocase of inner mitochondrial membrane 17 homolog A (yeast), translocase of inner mitochondrial membrane 17A
- External IDs: OMIM: 605057; MGI: 1343131; GeneCards: TIMM17A

Gene location (Human)
Chr.	Chromosome 1 (human)
Band	1q32.1	Start	201,955,503 bp
Band	1q32.1	End	201,970,664 bp

Gene location (Mouse)
Chr.	Chromosome 1 (mouse)
Band	1|1 E4	Start	135,295,213 bp
Band	1|1 E4	End	135,313,778 bp
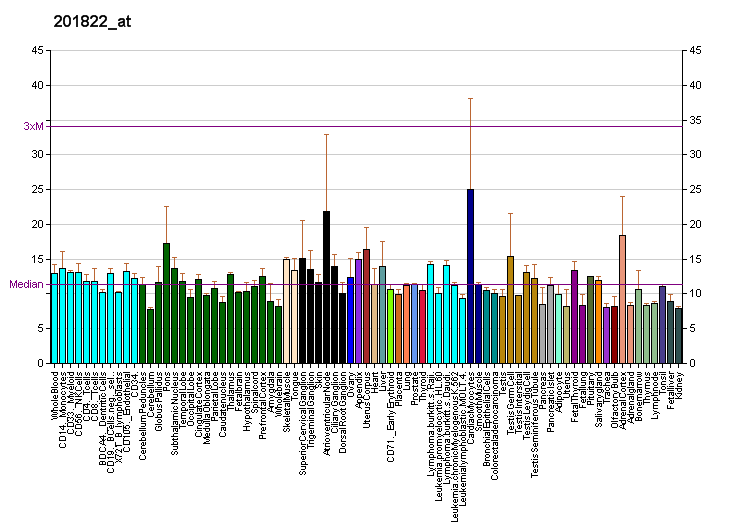

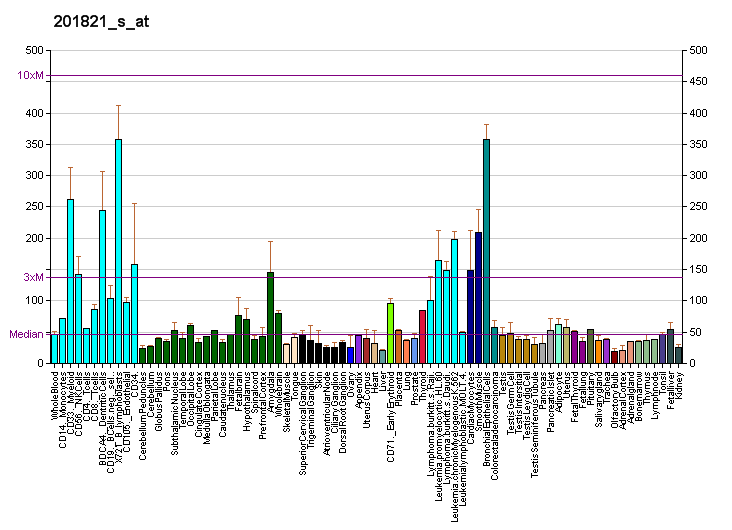

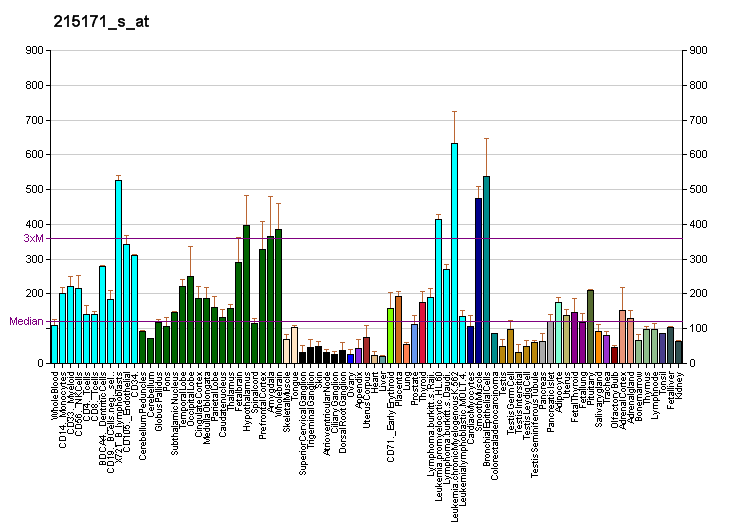
RNA expression pattern
Bgee	Human / Mouse (ortholog); Top expressed in: Brodmann area 23; right ventricle; biceps brachii; middle temporal gyrus; endothelial cell; orbitofrontal cortex; amniotic fluid; Skeletal muscle tissue of biceps brachii; myocardium of left ventricle; Epithelium of choroid plexus / Top expressed in: morula; morula; interventricular septum; soleus muscle; blastocyst; extraocular muscle; temporal muscle; cardiac muscle tissue of left ventricle; masseter muscle; plantaris muscle; More reference expression data
BioGPS	More reference expression data
Gene ontology
Molecular function	protein-transporting ATPase activity; protein transmembrane transporter activity
Cellular component	nucleoplasm; integral component of mitochondrial inner membrane; mitochondrial inner membrane; integral component of membrane; TIM23 mitochondrial import inner membrane translocase complex; mitochondrion; membrane
Biological process	protein targeting to mitochondrion; protein import into mitochondrial matrix; protein transport; intracellular protein transport; positive regulation of protein processing
Sources:Amigo / QuickGO
Orthologs
Databases	NCBI: entry; OMA: entry
Species	Human	Mouse
Entrez	10440	21854
Ensembl	ENSG00000134375	ENSMUSG00000062580
UniProt	Q99595	Q9Z0V8
RefSeq (mRNA)	NM_006335	NM_011590
RefSeq (protein)	NP_006326	NP_035720; NP_001347786; NP_001347787
Location (UCSC)	Chr 1: 201.96 – 201.97 Mb	Chr 1: 135.3 – 135.31 Mb
PubMed search
- Wikidata
View/Edit Human	View/Edit Mouse

Mitochondrial import inner membrane translocase subunit Tim17-A is an enzyme that in humans is encoded by the TIMM17A gene.

== See also ==
- Mitochondria Inner Membrane Translocase
- TIMM22
- TIMM23
- TIMM44
