= Inner mitochondrial membrane =

Cell structure

Cell biology
- mitochondrion
- Components of a typical mitochondrion 1 Outer membrane 1.1 Porin 2 Intermembrane space 2.1 Intracristal space 2.2 Peripheral space 3 Lamella 3.1 Inner membrane ◄ You are here 3.11 Inner boundary membrane 3.12 Cristal membrane 3.2 Matrix 3.3 Cristae 4 Mitochondrial DNA; 5 Matrix granule 6 Mitochondrial ribosome 7 ATP synthase

The inner mitochondrial membrane (IMM) is the mitochondrial membrane which separates the mitochondrial matrix from the intermembrane space.

== Structure ==
The structure of the inner mitochondrial membrane is extensively folded and compartmentalized. The numerous invaginations of the membrane are called cristae, separated by crista junctions from the inner boundary membrane juxtaposed to the outer membrane. Cristae significantly increase the total membrane surface area compared to a smooth inner membrane and thereby the available working space for oxidative phosphorylation.

The inner membrane creates two compartments. The region between the inner and outer membrane, called the intermembrane space, is largely continuous with the cytosol, while the more sequestered space inside the inner membrane is called the matrix.

=== Cristae ===
For typical liver mitochondria, the area of the inner membrane is about 5 times as large as the outer membrane due to cristae. This ratio is variable and mitochondria from cells that have a greater demand for ATP, such as muscle cells, contain even more cristae. Cristae membranes are studded on the matrix side with small round protein complexes known as F_{1} particles, the site of proton-gradient driven ATP synthesis. Cristae affect overall chemiosmotic function of mitochondria.

=== Cristae junctions ===
Cristae and the inner boundary membranes are separated by junctions. The end of cristae are partially closed by transmembrane protein complexes that bind head to head and link opposing crista membranes in a bottleneck-like fashion. This is because the abundance of hydrophobic cardiolipin introduces tension in the membrane, causing curvature. For example, deletion of the junction protein IMMT leads to a reduced inner membrane potential and impaired growth and to dramatically aberrant inner membrane structures which form concentric stacks instead of the typical invaginations.

Cristae junctions are stabilized by OPA1 by OMA1.

== Composition ==
The inner membrane of mitochondria is similar in lipid composition to the membrane of bacteria. This phenomenon can be explained by the endosymbiont hypothesis of the origin of mitochondria as prokaryotes internalized by a eukaryotic host cell.

In pig heart mitochondria, phosphatidylethanolamine makes up the majority of the inner mitochondrial membrane at 37.0% of the phospholipid composition. Phosphatidylcholine makes up about 26.5%, cardiolipin 25.4%, and phosphatidylinositol 4.5%. In S. cerevisiae mitochondria, phosphatidylcholine makes up 38.4% of the IMM, phosphatidylethanolamine makes up 24.0%, phosphatidylinositol 16.2%, cardiolipin 16.1%, phosphatidylserine 3.8%, and phosphatidic acid 1.5%.

In the inner mitochondrial membrane, the protein-to-lipid ratio is 80:20, in contrast to the outer membrane, which is 50:50.

== Permeability ==
The inner membrane is freely permeable to oxygen, carbon dioxide, and water only.It is much less permeable to ions and small molecules than the outer membrane, creating compartments by separating the matrix from the cytosolic environment, enabling the formation of an electrochemical gradient that allows for the synthesis of ATP. The inner mitochondrial membrane is both an electrical insulator and chemical barrier. Sophisticated transporter proteins, exist to allow specific molecules, such as matrix-targeted proteins synthesised in the cytosol, to cross this barrier and enter the matrix. There are several antiport systems embedded in the inner membrane, allowing exchange of anions between the cytosol and the mitochondrial matrix.

== IMM-associated proteins ==
- Electron transport chain

- NADH dehydrogenase (ubiquinone)
- Electron-transferring-flavoprotein dehydrogenase
- Electron-transferring flavoprotein
- Succinate dehydrogenase
- Alternative oxidase
- Cytochrome bc1 complex
- Cytochrome c
- Cytochrome c oxidase
- F-ATPase

- ATP–ADP translocase
- ATP-binding cassette transporter
- Cholesterol side-chain cleavage enzyme
- Protein tyrosine phosphatase
- Carnitine O-palmitoyltransferase
- Carnitine O-acetyltransferase
- Carnitine O-octanoyltransferase
- Cytochrome P450
- Translocase of the inner membrane
- Glutamate aspartate transporter
- Pyrimidine metabolism

- Dihydroorotate dehydrogenase
- Thymidylate synthase (FAD)

- HtrA serine peptidase 2
- Adrenodoxin reductase
- Heme biosynthesis

- Protoporphyrinogen oxidase
- Ferrochelatase

- Uncoupling protein

== See also ==
- Citric acid cycle
- Proton gradient
- Mitochondrial trifunctional protein
- Mitochondrial shuttle
- Transport proteins
