= Mitophagy =

Autophagic process in which mitochondria are delivered to the vacuole and degraded

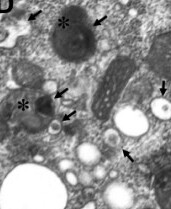
Autophagosome engulfment of mitochondria in Purkinje cell soma. Vacuoles containing mitochondria are marked with asterisks.

Mitophagy is the selective degradation of mitochondria by autophagy. It often occurs to defective mitochondria following damage or stress. The process of mitophagy was first described in 1915 by Margaret Reed Lewis and Warren Harmon Lewis. Ashford and Porter used electron microscopy to observe mitochondrial fragments in liver lysosomes by 1962, and a 1977 report suggested that "mitochondria develop functional alterations which would activate autophagy." The term "mitophagy" became common after J.J. Lemasters et al. adopted it in 2005, though uses date back to at least 1998.

Mitophagy is key in keeping the cell healthy. It promotes turnover of mitochondria and prevents accumulation of dysfunctional mitochondria which can lead to cellular degeneration. It is mediated by Atg32 (in yeast) and NIX and its regulator BNIP3 in mammals. Mitophagy is regulated by PINK1 and parkin proteins. In addition to the selective removal of damaged mitochondria, mitophagy is also required to adjust mitochondrial numbers to changing cellular metabolic needs, for steady-state mitochondrial turnover, and during certain cellular developmental stages, such as during differentiation of red blood cells.

== Role ==
Organelles and bits of cytoplasm are sequestered and targeted for degradation by the lysosome for hydrolytic digestion via autophagy. Dysregulated mitochondrial metabolism leads to the creation of by-products that lead to DNA damage and mutations. A healthy population of mitochondria is critical for cellular health. Previously it was thought that targeted degradation of mitochondria was a stochastic event, but accumulating evidence suggest that mitophagy is a selective process.

Generation of adenosine triphosphate (ATP) by oxidative phosphorylation leads to the production of various reactive oxygen species (ROS) in the mitochondria, and submitochondrial particles. Formation of ROS as a mitochondrial waste product leads to cytotoxicity and cell death. Mitochondria are susceptible to ROS damage. Damaged mitochondria cause a depletion in ATP and a release of cytochrome c, which leads to activation of caspases and onset of apoptosis. Mitochondrial damage is not caused solely by oxidative stress or disease processes; normal mitochondria accumulate oxidative damage hallmarks over time, which can damage mitochondria and the cell. These faulty mitochondria can further deplete ATP, increase production of ROS, and release proapoptotic proteins such as caspases.

Mitochondrial depletion reduces a spectrum of senescence effectors and phenotypes while preserving ATP production via enhanced glycolysis.

== Pathways ==
=== Mammals ===
==== PINK1 and Parkin ====
Several pathways induce mitophagy in mammalian cells. The PINK1 and Parkin pathway is the best characterized. This pathway starts by identifying damaged mitochondria. A 64-kDa protein, PTEN-induced kinase 1 (PINK1), detects mitochondrial quality. PINK1 contains a mitochondrial targeting sequence (MTS) and is recruited to the mitochondria. In healthy mitochondria, PINK1 is imported through the outer membrane via the TOM complex, and partially through the inner mitochondrial membrane via the TIM complex, such that it spans the inner mitochondrial membrane. The process of import into the inner membrane is associated with the cleavage of PINK1 from 64-kDa into a 60-kDa form. PINK1 is then cleaved by PARL into a 52-kDa form. This new form of PINK1 is degraded by proteases within the mitochondria. This keeps the concentration of PINK1 in check in healthy mitochondria.

In unhealthy mitochondria, the inner mitochondrial membrane becomes depolarized. This membrane potential is necessary for the TIM-mediated protein import. In depolarized mitochondria, PINK1 is no longer imported into the inner membrane, is not cleaved by PARL and PINK1 concentration increases in the outer mitochondrial membrane. PINK1 can then recruit Parkin, a cytosolic E3 ubiquitin ligase. It is thought that PINK1 phosphorylates Parkin ubiquitin ligase at S65 which initiates Parkin recruitment at the mitochondria. The phosphorylation site of Parkin, at S65, is homologous to the site where ubiquitin is phosphorylated. This phosphorylation activates Parkin by inducing dimerization, an active state. This allows for Parkin-mediated ubiquitination on other proteins.

Because of its PINK1-mediated recruitment to the mitochondrial surface, Parkin can ubiquitylate proteins in the outer mitochondrial membrane. These proteins include Mfn1/Mfn2 and mitoNEET. The ubiquitylation of mitochondrial surface proteins brings in mitophagy initiating factors. Parkin promotes ubiquitin chain linkages on both K63 and K48. K48 ubiquitination initiates degradation of the proteins, and could allow for passive mitochondrial degradation. K63 ubiquitination is thought to recruit autophagy adaptors LC3/GABARAP which lead to mitophagy. It is unclear which proteins are necessary and sufficient for mitophagy, and how these proteins, once ubiquitylated, initiate mitophagy.

In neurons, mitochondria are distributed to areas where energy demand is high, such as at synapses and Nodes of Ranvier. This distribution is maintained largely by motor protein-mediated mitochondrial transport along the axon. While neuronal mitophagy is thought to occur primarily in the cell body, it also occurs locally in the axon at sites distant from the cell body; in both the cell body and the axon, neuronal mitophagy occurs via the PINK1-Parkin pathway. Mitophagy in the nervous system may also occur transcellularly, where damaged mitochondria in retinal ganglion cell axons can be passed to neighboring astrocytes for degradation. This process is known as transmitophagy.

==== Mitophagy receptors ====
Other pathways that can induce mitophagy include mitophagy receptors on the outer mitochondrial membrane surface. These receptors include NIX1, BNIP3 and FUNDC1. All of these receptors contain LC3 interacting regions (LIR) consensus sequences that bind LC3/GABARAP which can degrade mitochondria. In hypoxic conditions BNIP3 is upregulated by HIF1α. BNIP3 is then phosphorylated at its serine residues near the LIR sequence which promotes LC3 binding. FUNDC1 is also hypoxia sensitive, although it is constitutively present at the outer mitochondrial membrane during normal conditions. Mitophagy can be artificially introduced by a series of synthetic autophagy receptors that are composed of antibody fragments to recognize the mitochondrial outer membrane proteins.

=== Yeast ===
Mitophagy in yeast was first presumed after the discovery of Yeast Mitochondrial Escape genes (yme), specifically yme1. Yme1 like other genes in the family showed increase escape of mtDNA, but was the only one that showed an increase in mitochondrial degradation. Through work on this gene which mediates the escape of mtDNA, researchers discovered that mitochondrial turnover is triggered by proteins.

More was discovered about genetic control of mitophagy after studies on UTH1 protein. After screening for genes that regulate longevity, one study reported that ΔUTH1 strains inhibited mitophagy without affecting autophagy. This study also reported that the Uth1p protein is necessary to move mitochondria to the vacuole. This suggested a specialized system for mitophagy. Other studies looked at AUP1, a mitochondrial phosphatase, and reported that Aup1 marks mitochondria for elimination.

Another yeast protein associated with mitophagy is a mitochondrial inner membrane protein, Mdm38p/Mkh1p. This protein is part of the complex that exchanges K+/H+ ions across the inner membrane. Deletions in this protein causes swelling, a loss of membrane potential, and mitochondrial fragmentation.

A 2009 study reported that ATG32 (autophagy related gene 32) plays a crucial role in yeast mitophagy. It is localized to the mitochondria. Once mitophagy is initiated, Atg32 binds to Atg11 and the Atg32-associated mitochondria are transported to the vacuole. Atg32 silencing stops recruitment of autophagy machinery and mitochondrial degradation. Atg32 is not necessary for other forms of autophagy.

These proteins likely play a role in maintaining healthy mitochondria, but mutations have shown that dysregulation can lead to selective mitochondria degradation. Whether these proteins work in concert, are main players in mitophagy, or members in a larger network to control autophagy still remains unclear.

A 2019 study reported that mitophagy activation underlies methionine restriction's positive impact on yeast lifespan. (Other affected species include worms, flies, and mice.)

== Role in immune response ==
Mitochondria play an important role in the immune system. Mitochondrial damage-associated molecular patterns (DAMPs) such as parts of damaged organelles or mtDNA are secreted by cells following sterile inflammation, dysregulations in cell metabolism, or infection. These DAMPs act as one of the key triggers of the innate immune response. Due to that, it can be seen as an immunomodulatory tool to keep the immune response in check.

=== Hematopoiesis ===
In addition to immunomodulatory functions, mitophagy can regulate the fate of hematopoietic stem cells (HSC). Mitophagy impaired due to the deletion of autophagy-related genes lead to a loss of HSC function, more likely as a result of mitochondrial damage that stimulated excessive ROS production. On the contrary, mitophagy induction appeared to be protective for HSC and directed stem cell differentiation to the myeloid lineage.

=== Macrophages ===
Immune cell activation and the change in phenotype are followed by metabolic reprogramming. Activated cells, including macrophages, favor glycolysis, which is also accompanied by mitochondrial clearance through mitophagy. On the contrary, macrophage regulatory phenotypes (M2) are associated with the induction of oxidative phosphorylation, which is dependent on mitochondrial biogenesis. This highlights the important role of mitophagy in the determination of the macrophage phenotype.

Mitophagy impairment in macrophages is common in the early stages of some pathological states. Macrophages play an important role in the innate immune response. However, conditions leading to immune paralysis, e.g. sepsis, make them incapable of efficient bactericidal clearance. A 2018 study highlighted the role of mitophagy as a biomarker of different stages of sepsis, as it is inhibited in the early stage and induced later. A 2019 study reported compromised mitophagy in experimental and human kidney fibrosis. Some mitophagy-associated molecules such as Mfn2 and Parkin are negatively regulated in this pathological state. Consequently, the frequency of regulatory profibrotic M2 macrophages was higher, confirming the role of mitophagy in the induction of the pro-inflammatory M1 phenotype.

=== Inflammasome ===
Many studies demonstrate that the release of mtROS and mtDNA as DAMPs plays a role in the activation of the inflammasome and following inflammation mediated by IL-1β. NF-κB has been reported to control the activation of the inflammasome by adopting the p62-mitophagy pathway. NF-κB is an important protein complex for immune cell signaling and also plays an important role in mitophagy induction.

The importance of mitophagy was demonstrated by the deletion of Beclin 1 and LC3b autophagy-associated genes in bone marrow-derived macrophages (BMDM). Defective mitophagy and accumulation of damaged mitochondria led to enhanced mtROS production and the release of cytosolic mtDNA. As a result, activation of the NLRP3 inflammasome increased. Studies in 2019 and 2020 reported that Parkin deficiency also triggered NLRP3 activation in a mtROS-dependent manner and as a result promoted viral clearance. Furthermore, Pink1 and Parkin deficiency in a model of polymicrobial sepsis induced inflammasome activation and appeared to be critical in host protection. A 202 study described the loss of autophagy protein Atg16L1 which induced the cleavage of IL-1β by caspases associated with NLRP3. Many other proteins are known to modulate mitophagy. Some are cell-specific, for example, macrophages produce stress-induced proteins that induce mitophagy followed by inhibition of NLRP3 inflammasome assembly. In general, it can be said that many pathological inflammatory responses are the result of an imbalance in the crosstalk between the inflammasome and the mitophagy.

=== Viral immune response ===
It is known that some viruses can modulate mitophagy (directly or indirectly) using different mechanisms and, as a result, cause a disbalance in the innate immune response. mtDNA that exits damaged mitochondria acts as one of the triggers of type I interferon (IFN I) production. Some viruses can induce mitophagy and therefore inhibit the production of these crucial antiviral cytokines. There are reports of viral proteins directly or indirectly interacting with autophagy and mitophagy-associated proteins such as LC3 or Pink1-Parkin and usurping them to trigger mitophagy and subsequently inhibit IFN I responses.

Mitochondria regulate its morphology by context-dependent constant fission and fusion. Fission is crucial for mitophagy, as it cuts off a small mitochondrial part that can be further engulfed by the autophagosome. The viruses Hepatitis B (HBV) and hepatitis C (HCV) take advantage of this mechanism by inducing mitochondrial fission and following mitophagy. HBV stimulates the phosphorylation of Drp1, a fission-promoting GTPase molecule, and the expression and recruitment of Parkin. HCV promotes mitophagy by inducing ROS production. Other viruses such as Human Parainfluenza (HPIV3) regulate host immune responses by clearing mitochondrial antiviral-signaling protein (MAVS) located in the outer mitochondrial membrane. Specific proteins are produced by HPIV3 that induce mitophagy in the infected cell, thus promoting MAVS degradation and the corresponding inhibition of IFN I production. The same strategy is used by the SARS-CoV-encoded protein ORF-9b, which triggers the degradation of several mitochondrial proteins, including MAVS.

== Relation to health ==
=== Cancer ===
As of 2020, the role of mitophagy in cancer was not fully understood. Some models of mitophagy, such as PINK1 or BNIP3-mediated mitophagy, have been associated with tumor suppression in humans and mice. Mitophagy associated with NIX, in contrast, is associated with tumor promotion. In 1920 Warburg observed that certain tumors display a metabolic shift towards glycolysis. This is referred to as the "Warburg effect", in which cancer cells produce energy via the conversion of glucose into lactate, even in the presence of oxygen (aerobic glycolysis). Despite nearly a century since it was first described, questions remained unanswered regarding the Warburg effect. Initially, Warburg attributed this metabolic shift to mitochondrial dysfunction in cancer cells. Further studies in tumor biology have shown that the increased growth rate in cancer cells is due to glycolysis overdrive (glycolytic shift), which decreases oxidative phosphorylation and mitochondrial density. As a consequence, cancer cells produce large amounts of lactate. The excess lactate is then released to the extracellular environment which decreases extracellular pH. This micro-environment acidification can lead to cellular stress, which leads to autophagy. Autophagy is activated by a range of stimuli, including nutrient depletion, hypoxia, and activated oncogenes. However, it appears that autophagy can help in cancer cell survival under conditions of metabolic stress and it may confer resistance to anti-cancer therapies such as radiation and chemotherapy. Additionally, in the tumor microenvironment, hypoxia-inducible transcription factor 1-alpha (HIF1A) increases, which promotes expression of BNIP3, an essential factor for mitophagy.

=== Parkinson's disease ===
Parkinson's disease is a neurodegenerative disorder pathologically characterized by death of dopamine-producing neurons in the substantia nigra. Several genetic mutations are implicated in Parkinson's disease, including loss of function PINK1 and Parkin. Loss of function in either of these genes results in the accumulation of damaged mitochondria, and aggregation of proteins or inclusion bodies – eventually leading to neuronal death.

Mitochondria dysfunction is thought to be involved in Parkinson's pathogenesis. In spontaneous, usually aging related Parkinson's disease (non-genetically linked), the disease is commonly caused by dysfunctional mitochondria, cellular oxidative stress, autophagic alterations and protein aggregation. These can lead to mitochondrial swelling and depolarization. It is important to regulate dysfunctional mitochondria, because these traits could be induced by mitochondrial dysfunction and can induce cell death. Disorders in energy creation by mitochondria can cause cellular degeneration, like those seen in the substantia nigra.

=== Tuberculosis ===
Tuberculosis is a contagious disease caused by infection with the airborne pathogen Mycobacterium tuberculosis. A 2021 study reported that chronic infection by M. tuberculosis in the lungs or ex-vivo infection by non-pathogenic mycobacteria (M. bovis) elicits activation of the receptor-mediated mitophagy pathway. The receptor mediated mitophagy pathways are elicited through NIX that gets upregulated during tuberculosis. Elicited NIX/BNIP3L receptor recruitment of LC3 molecules mediate formation of phagophore that engulf defective mitochondria directly.

=== Cardiovascular disease ===
Cardiac hypertrophy is the adaptive response to haemodynamic stress or myocardial injury, and allows the heart to increase oxygen supply. However, hypertrophy can increase interstitial fibrosis and decrease ventricular function. Myocardium's oxygen requirement implies that mitochondria are central to maintain optimal performance. Changes in mitochondrial morphology may affect adaptation during cardiac remodeling, with effects on diabetic cardiomyopathy, atherosclerosis, damage from ischaemia–reperfusion, cardiac hypertrophy and decompensated heart failure.

=== Activity ===
A 2017 study reported that in mice 90 minutes of aerobic exercise induced a 45% increase in mitophagy, preceded by increased phosphorylation of AMP activated protein kinase (Ampk).
