= Ninerafaxstat =

Chemical compound

Clinical data
- Other names: IMB-1018972; IMB-101

Legal status
- Legal status: Investigational

Identifiers
- IUPAC name: 2-[4-[(2,3,4-Trimethoxyphenyl)methyl]piperazin-1-yl]ethyl pyridine-3-carboxylate
- CAS Number: 2254741-41-6
- PubChem CID: 137359209
- ChemSpider: 115007142
- UNII: 0RB6V4E5XN
- ChEMBL: ChEMBL5095242

Chemical and physical data
- Formula: C_{22}H_{29}N_{3}O_{5}
- Molar mass: 415.490 g·mol^{−1}
- 3D model (JSmol): Interactive image
- SMILES: COC1=C(C(=C(C=C1)CN2CCN(CC2)CCOC(=O)C3=CN=CC=C3)OC)OC
- InChI: InChI=1S/C22H29N3O5/c1-27-19-7-6-18(20(28-2)21(19)29-3)16-25-11-9-24(10-12-25)13-14-30-22(26)17-5-4-8-23-15-17/h4-8,15H,9-14,16H2,1-3H3; Key:AGVJLPKGBKSLKF-UHFFFAOYSA-N

Ninerafaxstat (IMB-1018972 or IMB-101) is a cardiac mitotrope agent investigated by Imbria for diabetic cardiomyopathy, myocardial ischemia, and hypertrophic cardiomyopathy.
