= CLPB =

Protein found in humans

Identifiers
- Aliases: CLPB, HSP78, SKD3, ANKCLB, MEGCANN, MGCA7, ClpB homolog, mitochondrial AAA ATPase chaperonin, caseinolytic mitochondrial matrix peptidase chaperone subunit B, SCN9, MGCA7A
- External IDs: OMIM: 616254; MGI: 1100517; GeneCards: CLPB

Gene location (Human)
Chr.	Chromosome 11 (human)
Band	11q13.4	Start	72,285,495 bp
Band	11q13.4	End	72,434,680 bp

Gene location (Mouse)
Chr.	Chromosome 7 (mouse)
Band	7|7 E2	Start	101,312,840 bp
Band	7|7 E2	End	101,444,713 bp
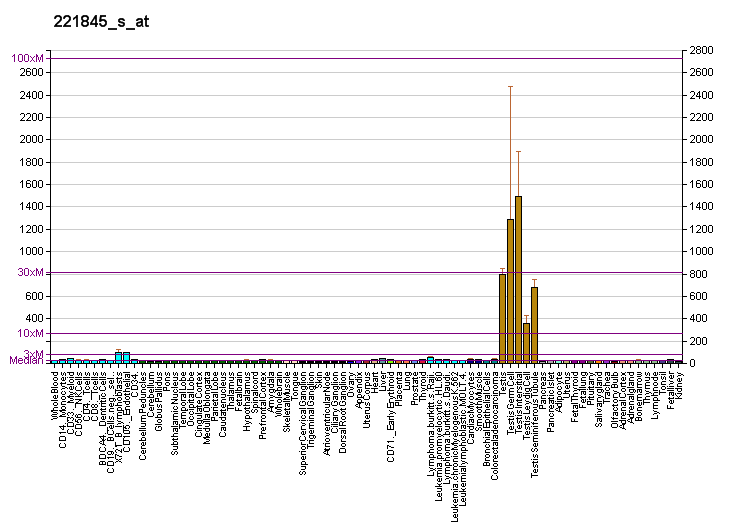
RNA expression pattern
Bgee	Human / Mouse (ortholog); Top expressed in: sperm; left testis; right testis; right adrenal gland; islet of Langerhans; right lobe of liver; stromal cell of endometrium; right adrenal cortex; left adrenal gland; monocyte / Top expressed in: spermatid; seminiferous tubule; spermatocyte; muscle of thigh; right kidney; otic vesicle; otic placode; saccule; myocardium of ventricle; brown adipose tissue; More reference expression data
BioGPS	More reference expression data
Gene ontology
Molecular function	nucleotide binding; ATPase activity; protein binding; hydrolase activity; ATP binding; molecular function
Cellular component	mitochondrion; cellular component
Biological process	cellular response to heat
Sources:Amigo / QuickGO
Orthologs
Databases	NCBI: entry; OMA: entry
Species	Human	Mouse
Entrez	81570	20480
Ensembl	ENSG00000162129	ENSMUSG00000001829
UniProt	Q9H078	Q60649
RefSeq (mRNA)	NM_001258392; NM_001258393; NM_001258394; NM_030813	NM_009191; NM_001363991
RefSeq (protein)	NP_001245321; NP_001245322; NP_001245323; NP_110440	NP_033217; NP_001350920
Location (UCSC)	Chr 11: 72.29 – 72.43 Mb	Chr 7: 101.31 – 101.44 Mb
PubMed search
- Wikidata
View/Edit Human	View/Edit Mouse

Caseinolytic peptidase B protein homolog (CLPB), also known as Skd3, is a mitochondrial AAA ATPase chaperone that in humans is encoded by the gene CLPB, which encodes an adenosine triphosphate-(ATP) dependent chaperone. Skd3 is localized in mitochondria and widely expressed in human tissues. High expression in adult brain and low expression in granulocyte is found. It is a potent protein disaggregase that chaperones the mitochondrial intermembrane space. Mutations in the CLPB gene could cause autosomal recessive metabolic disorder with intellectual disability/developmental delay, congenital neutropenia, progressive brain atrophy, movement disorder, cataracts, and 3-methylglutaconic aciduria. Recently, heterozygous, dominant negative mutations in CLPB have been identified as a cause of severe congenital neutropenia (SCN).

== Structure ==
=== Gene ===
The CLPB gene has 19 exons and is located at the chromosome band 11q13.4.

=== Protein ===
Skd3 has five isoforms due to alternative splicing. Isoform 1 is considered to have the 'canonical' sequence. The protein is 78.7 kDa in size and composed of 707 amino acids. It contains an N-terminal mitochondrial targeting sequence (1-92 amino acids). After processing, the mature mitochondrial protein has a theoretical pI of 7.53. Skd3 is further processed by the mitochondrial rhomboid protease PARL at amino acid 127. Skd3 has a specific C-terminal D2 domain and proteins with this domain form the sub-family of Caseinolytic peptidase (Clp) proteins, also called HSP100. The domain composition of human Skd3 is different from that of microbial or plant orthologs. Notably, the presence of ankyrin repeats replaced the first of two ATPase domains found in bacteria and fungi.

== Function ==
Skd3 belongs to the HCLR clade of the large AAA+ superfamily. The unifying characteristic of this family is the hydrolysis of ATP through the AAA+ domain to produce energy required to catalyze protein unfolding, disassembly and disaggregation. Skd3 does not cooperate with HSP70, unlike its bacterial orthologue. The in vitro ATPase activity of Skd3 has been confirmed. Skd3 is a potent disaggregase in vitro and is activated by PARL to increase disaggregation activity by over 10-fold. Indeed, PARL-activated Skd3 is capable of disassembling alpha-synuclein fibrils in vitro. Even though the bacterial orthologue, ClpB, contributes to the thermotolerance of cells, it is yet unclear if Skd3 plays a similar role within mitochondria. The interaction with protein like HAX1 suggests that human Skd3 may be involved in apoptosis. Indeed, Skd3 solubilizes HAX1 in cells and the deletion of the CLPB gene in human cells has been shown to sensitize cells to apoptotic signals. In humans, the presence of ankyrin repeats replaced the first of two ATPase domains found in bacteria and fungi, which might have evolved to ensure more elaborate substrate recognition or to support a putative chaperone function. Either the ankyrin repeats alone or the AAA+ domain were found to be insufficient to support disaggregation activity. With only one ATPase domain, Skd3 is postulated competent in the use of ATP hydrolysis energy for threading unfolded polypeptide through the central channel of the hexamer ring. />

== Clinical significance ==
Neonatal encephalopathy is a kind of severe neurological impairment in the newborn with no specific clinical sign at the early stage of life, and its diagnosis remains a challenge. This neonatal encephalopathy includes a heterogeneous group of 3-methylglutaconic aciduria syndromes and loss of Skd3 function is reported to be one of the causes. Knocking down the clpB gene in the zebrafish induced reduction of growth and increment of motor activity, which is similar to the signs observed in patients. Its loss may lead to a broad phenotypic spectrum encompassing intellectual disability/developmental delay, congenital neutropenia, progressive brain atrophy, movement disorder, and bilateral cataracts, with 3-methylglutaconic aciduria. Further investigation into Skd3 may shed a new light on the diagnosis of this disease.

== Interactions ==
This protein is known to interact with:

- HAX1
- PARL
- HTRA2
- SMAC/DIABLO
- OPA1
- OPA3
- PHB2
- MICU1
- MICU2
- SLC25A25
- SLC25A13
- TIMM8A
- TIMM8B
- TIMM13
- TIMM21
- TIMM22
- TIMM23
- TIMM50
- NDUFA8
- NDUFA11
- NDUFA13
- NDUFB7
- NDUFB10
- TTC19
- COX11
- CYC1
