= Dietary management of Parkinson's disease =

Parkinson's disease is the 2nd most prevalent neurological disorder within the United States and Europe, affecting around 1% of the population over the age of 60. While the link connecting the onset of Parkinson's disease to environmental factors is known, the link between dietary patterns and the disease is just beginning to be researched more fully. Additionally, other research has sought to examine the symptoms of the disease and propose methods on how to alleviate these symptoms through changes in diet. Current medications that work to alleviate the symptoms of Parkinson's disease can also be made more effective through changes in diet.

== Background ==
Parkinson's disease is a degenerative disorder of the central nervous system that results due to the death of dopamine producing cells within the central nervous system. Because of the death of these cells, less dopamine is available within the brain, resulting in tremors and other side effects within motor functions. The reason for the deaths of these cells is a topic of current research, with some theories suggesting a contribution of oxidative stress due to free radicals and inflammation. Currently, there are no treatments to cure Parkinson's disease, yet a variety of treatment options are available to alleviate the symptoms including medication and dietary changes.

== Dietary prevention and neuroprotection ==
Many theories of the cause of Parkinson's disease symptoms point to the death of dopamine-producing neurons within the central nervous system due to oxidative stress. This oxidative stress is caused by metabolism and the production of molecules known as free radicals. Accumulation of these free radicals within the brain can cause damage to neurons. Additionally, dopamine-producing neurons are particularly vulnerable to oxidative stress due to the relatively high levels of metabolism associated with the production of dopamine, resulting in comparatively higher amounts of free radicals being produced by these dopamine-producing neurons. The effects of dopamine within the brain are widespread, including voluntary motor control. With the death of these dopamine-producing cells within an area of the mid-brain known as the substantia nigra, the central nervous system has less control over the body, resulting in the tremors and rigidity seen in patients with Parkinson's disease.

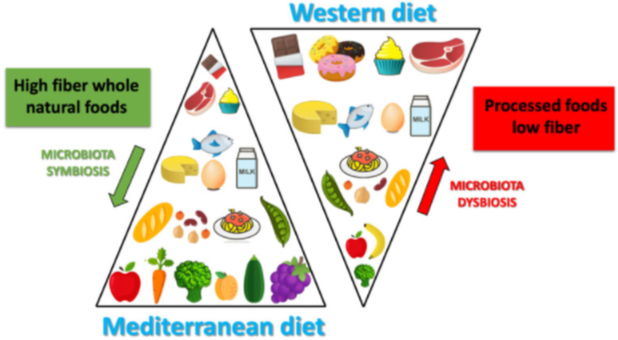
Mediterranean diet foods in comparison to the typical Western diet

Antioxidants are suggested to be useful in preventing Parkinson's disease because they scavenge free radicals such as reactive nitrogen and oxygen, preventing their build-up and the destruction of dopamine-producing neurons. Research has attempted to link dietary patterns to the likelihood of developing Parkinson's disease. The MIND and Mediterranean diets are emerging as potentially beneficial diets for people with Parkinson's. People with Parkinson's who maintained the Mediterranean diet were more likely to have symptoms appear 17.4 years earlier than those who closely followed it; while MIND diet participants functioned at a cognitive level 7.5 years younger, and they declined cognitively more slowly. Research shows that a diet consisting of foods typically associated with the Mediterranean diet may act as a preventative measure for the disease due to the high levels of antioxidants found within these foods such as complex phenols, vitamins C and E, and carotenoids. A typical Mediterranean diet consists of a high intake of vegetables, legumes, fruits, and cereals, olive oil (unsaturated fatty acids), and fish and low to moderate intake of foods such as dairy, meats, poultry. Research by Johns Hopkins has found that a common compound in fruit, called farnesol, preserves dopaminergic neurons. However, people who consume more dairy products have an increased likelihood of developing Parkinson's disease. The increased risk from consumption of dairy products is slight and dairy provides different nutrients that are beneficial for people with Parkinson's. Additionally, it has been seen that the intake of animal fats may be linked to the development of the disease. It has also been suggested that a diet that results in high plasma urate can result in a reduced risk of developing Parkinson's.

== Management of symptoms through diet ==
Typical symptoms of the disease include bodily shaking, rigidity, slowness of movement, difficulty in movement, as well as other motor related symptoms. As the disease progresses, patients develop cognitive and behavior problems such as dementia, sensory impairment, sleep problems, and emotional issues. Parkinson's disease (PD) can have an effect on neurons that control the digestive process, so subjects may experience constipation and gastroparesis due to the disease. PD may also make a subject more tired in the later parts of the day, decreasing the likelihood to want to eat food and leading to further dietary problems.

No special diet is required for subjects with PD, yet a well balanced diet is beneficial due to the effects of increased energy and improved effectiveness of drugs. Additionally, in research it has been shown that nutritionally healthy, balanced meals enable the most effective use of symptom reducing drugs. In order to cope with the decrease in energy that many patients express, smaller meals are recommended for such cases. A good diet includes high fiber foods (such as vegetables, dried peas, beans, whole grain foods, pasta, rice, and fresh fruit) in order to reduce constipation, low saturated fats and cholesterol, low sugar and salt intake, plenty of water, and limited alcohol intake. Although this needs to be further elucidated, recent studies have shown that curcumin, a chemical in turmeric which is highly consumed by the South Asian population, can have protective roles in PD.

== Dietary considerations with medications ==
Treatments are only effective in moderating the symptoms of the disease, mainly with drugs including levodopa (L-DOPA) and dopamine agonists. Once too many dopamine producing cells have been lost however, the effects of L-DOPA become less effective. Once this occurs, a complication known as dyskinesia commonly occurs in which subjects undergo involuntary writhing movements despite the use of L-DOPA. The effects of dyskinesia vary between periods of high symptoms and low symptoms. In order to limit the onset of dyskinesia, typical L-DOPA dosages are kept as low as possible while still achieving desired results. Lastly, in cases in which drugs are ineffective, deep brain stimulation and surgery can be used to reduce symptoms.

Levodopa is taken orally and is absorbed through the small intestines into the blood, competing for access with natural proteins. Additionally, once the drug has entered the blood stream, L-DOPA utilizes the same pathways to cross the blood–brain barrier as natural protein. Only about 5–10% of levodopa crosses the blood brain barrier, while the remaining is metabolized elsewhere in the body. The metabolism of medications elsewhere is known to cause side effects such as nausea, dyskinesias, and stiffness.

In order to improve the effectiveness of PD drugs such as L-DOPA, a diet low in excessive protein is recommended since L-DOPA competes with these dietary proteins for access to the blood and brain. It is therefore recommended that the drug be taken so that it is not affected by digestion. It is recommended to take L-DOPA ideally 30 minutes before eating or at least 1 hour afterwards. A protein redistribution diet is sometimes recommended in which most protein should be eaten in the afternoon. However, with the development of dyskinesias the protein redistribution diet need not apply because slowing the absorption of L-DOPA may be beneficial. Plenty of water with the intake of L-DOPA ensures that the drug will be absorbed more quickly. L-DOPA can cause nausea in some subjects when taken on an empty stomach. Methods to reduce nausea include taking carbidopa (Sinemet), sugary drinks to calm the stomach, and avoidance of orange and grapefruit juices due to high acidity. Some PD medications are known to cause the subject to become thirsty, and methods to reduce thirst include drinking plenty of water as well as limiting caffeine uptake because it may interfere with medication or increase thirst.
