= Nix (gene) =

Nix is a pro-apoptotic gene that is regulated by Histotoxic hypoxia. It expresses a signaling protein related to the BH3-only family. This protein induces autophagy, an intracellular function by which cytoplasmic components are delivered to the lysosome to be broken down and used elsewhere or excreted from the cell. This protein is important in development because it allows cells to have a consistent store of cellular components. It also holds an important role in the differentiation and maturation of erythrocytes and lymphocytes by the process of mitophagy with the help of its regulator BNIP3. Using a gene knockout technique in mice, scientists have been able to attribute this pruning of mitochondria and induction of cellular necrosis to the expression of the Nix gene. The Nix protein may be associated with certain kinds of cancer formation. In mouse models, loss of Nix resulted in a delayed onset of tumors for pancreatic cancer, and was additionally associated with reduced mitophagy and increased oxidative metabolism. Nix therefore may be a tumor promoter for pancreatic cancer.

Not only does it hold a role in the differentiation of these immune and oxygen-carrying cells, but it also affects the development and maintenance of heart tissue. It has been found to be a cause of pathologic hypertrophy and cardiomyocyte apoptosis involved in congenital heart disease. The effects of Nix are amplified in the neonatal heart compared to the adult heart. Overexpression of Nix in the fetal mouse has been found to cause severe growth retardation and massive cardiomyocyte apoptosis often followed by lethality. These early interactions between the fetal heart and Nix expression are thought to have a role in the development of adult heart disease.
