= Parkinson's disease and gut-brain axis =

Gastrointestinal dysfunction and Parkinson's disease

Parkinson's disease (PD), the second most common neurodegenerative disease after Alzheimer's disease, affects 1% of people over 60 years of age. In the past three decades, the number of PD cases has doubled globally from 2.5 million in 1990 to 6.1 million in 2016. As of 2022, there are ~10 million PD cases globally. In the United States, the estimated prevalence of PD by 2030 is estimated will be ~1.24 million. These numbers are expected to increase as life expectancy and the age of the general population increase. PD is considered to be a multisystem and multifactorial disease, where many factors, such as the environment, gut, lifestyle and genetics, play a significant role in the onset and progression of the disease.

== Pathology ==
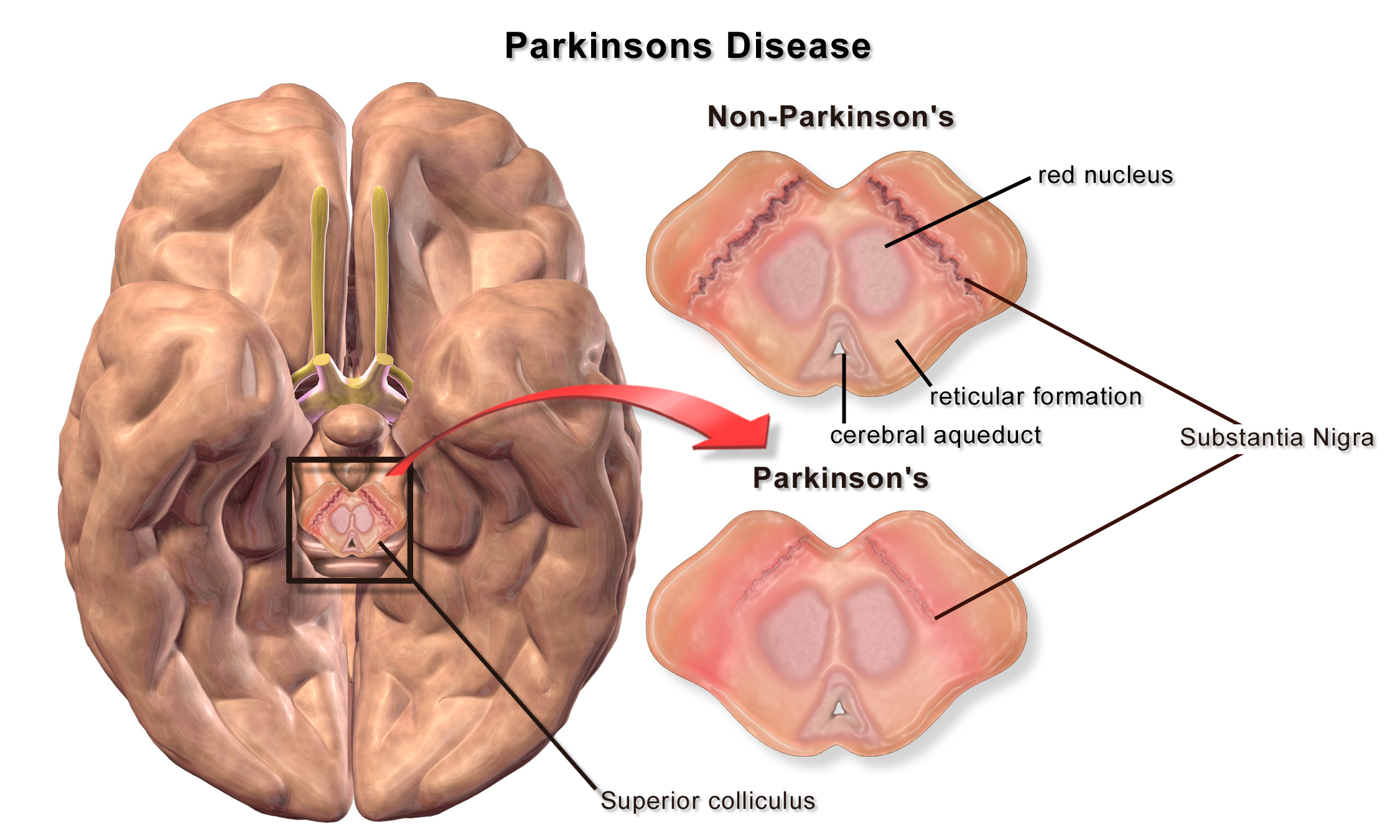
Neuropathological hallmarks of Parkinson's Disease Loss of dopaminergic neurons in the substantia nigra pars compacta area of the brain (bottom) contributes to the motor symptoms.

The neuropathological hallmarks of PD include the loss of dopaminergic neurons in the substantia nigra pars compacta region of the brain (shown in figure) and the presence of aggregated alpha-synuclein. Under physiological conditions, alpha-synuclein, a protein encoded by the SNCA gene, is found at the synapses of neurons, where it regulates synaptic signaling and plasticity by modulating the release of neurotransmitters. It is most abundantly found in the brain and to a smaller extent in other tissues, such as the gut and heart. Under pathological conditions in PD, alpha-synuclein undergoes a conformational change, resulting in a misfolded insoluble protein that aggregates into beta-sheets and forms protein inclusions called Lewy Bodies. Aggregated alpha-synuclein loses its ability to bind at the membrane, disrupting cellular processes and synaptic formation. It is hypothesized to propagate in a prion-like manner, spreading within and between other cells, eventually leading to neurodegeneration, which is seen in the illustration with the loss of dopaminergic neurons. These pathological changes are also found peripherally (outside of the central nervous system - CNS) in early stages of PD. However, the mechanisms involved in these changes are not well understood.

== Symptomology ==
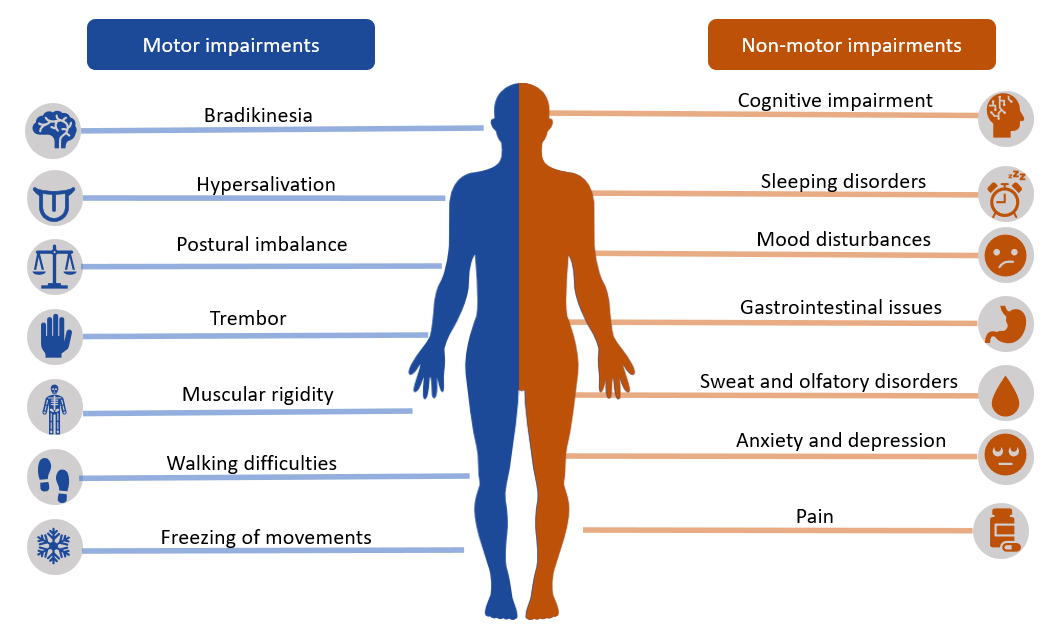
Overview of the motor and non-motor symptoms of Parkinson's disease

The clinical presentation of PD include both motor and non-motor symptoms. The cardinal motor symptoms of PD are rigidity, abnormal gait, resting tremor, stiffness, bradykinesia, and dystonia. Non-motor symptoms include autonomic dysfunction, olfaction dysfunction, cognitive impairment, urinogenital complications, hyposmia, depression, asymmetric vague shoulder pain, gastrointestinal (GI) dysfunction, and REM sleep behavior disorder (acting out dreams during REM). In early stages of PD, non-motor symptoms occur prior to the onset of motor symptoms, contributing to a delay in PD diagnosis and even misdiagnosis in up to 15% of cases. By the time motor symptoms appear and treatment is initiated, there is already over 50% dopaminergic neuronal cell loss in the substantia nigra. Therefore, non-motor symptoms are valuable biomarkers of early stages of PD and provide a potential avenue for early disease diagnosis and early intervention.

== Gastrointestinal dysfunction ==
GI symptoms can occur up to 20 years prior to the onset of clinical motor symptoms. The potential involvement of the gut in PD was first suggested over 200 years ago by James Parkinson, who describes PD as “a disordered state of the stomach and bowels (that) may induce a morbid action in a part of the medulla spinalis”. However, this crosstalk between the gut and the brain was not fully understood and was not extensively explored in PD until more recently in the last two decades. There is increasing evidence that have further reported on the role of gastrointestinal (GI) dysfunction in the initiation of neurodegeneration as well as the pathogenesis of PD.

In the upper GI tract, dysphagia is a swallowing impairment that results in inadequate mastication (chewing), body mass index below than 20, weight loss and malnutrition. Drooling is also common as a result of the difficulties with swallowing and not with saliva secretion, which is actually decreased in PD. Oropharyngeal dysphagia results in choking or aspiration. Swallowing involves three phases - oral, pharyngeal, esophageal, of which the first two are affected in oropharyngeal dysphagia. This motor symptom affects 35% of patients and worsens with the disease progression, but does improve with medication. Gastroparesis results in the paralysis of the stomach that contributes to 50% of patients feeling bloated and full while 15% experience vomiting and nausea. Solid meal scintigraphy as well as a breath test are used to measure gastric emptying time (GET), which is prolonged in PD patients. Other methods include MRI based imaging and electromagnetic capsule system. Small intestinal bacterial overgrowth (SIBO): results in diarrhea, abdominal discomfort, bloating and can lead to absorption issues of PD medications. In the lower GI tract, constipation is characterized by straining during defecation or having less than 3 bowel movements per week, which occurs in 40-50% of PD patients.

Treatments of GI symptoms
| Symptom | GI location | Treatment | References |
|---|---|---|---|
| drooling | upper - mouth | behavioral changes that increase swallowing like chewing gum; anticholinergic medication; local treatments: atropine solutions, hyoscine patches, parotid and submandibular botulinum toxin injections | |
| oropharyngeal dysphagia | upper | speech and language therapist | |
| gastroparesis | upper | domperidone is a dopamine receptor antagonist; gastric pacemaker; camicinal: motilin receptor agonist. Since levodopa remains in the stomach longer due to the decreased gastric emptying, it gets converted into dopamine preventing it from being able to get into the brain via not being able to cross the blood brain barrier. Camicinal improves gastric emptying and hence better levodopa absorption into the brain.; DA-9701: plant-derived that act on receptors of the GI tract | |
| SIBO | upper - small intestine | antibiotics | |
| constipation | lower | lifestyle modifications - exercise, increased fluid intake and fiber; psyllium - a laxative; Lubiprostone - a chloride channel activator; probiotic supplement; botulinum toxin injections into the puborectalis muscle; Fecal microbiota transplantation (FMT) from a healthy host has been shown to treat constipation in PD patients. Ongoing clinical trials, are further examining its effects on other PD symptoms. | |

== Microbiome-GBA dysfunction in PD ==
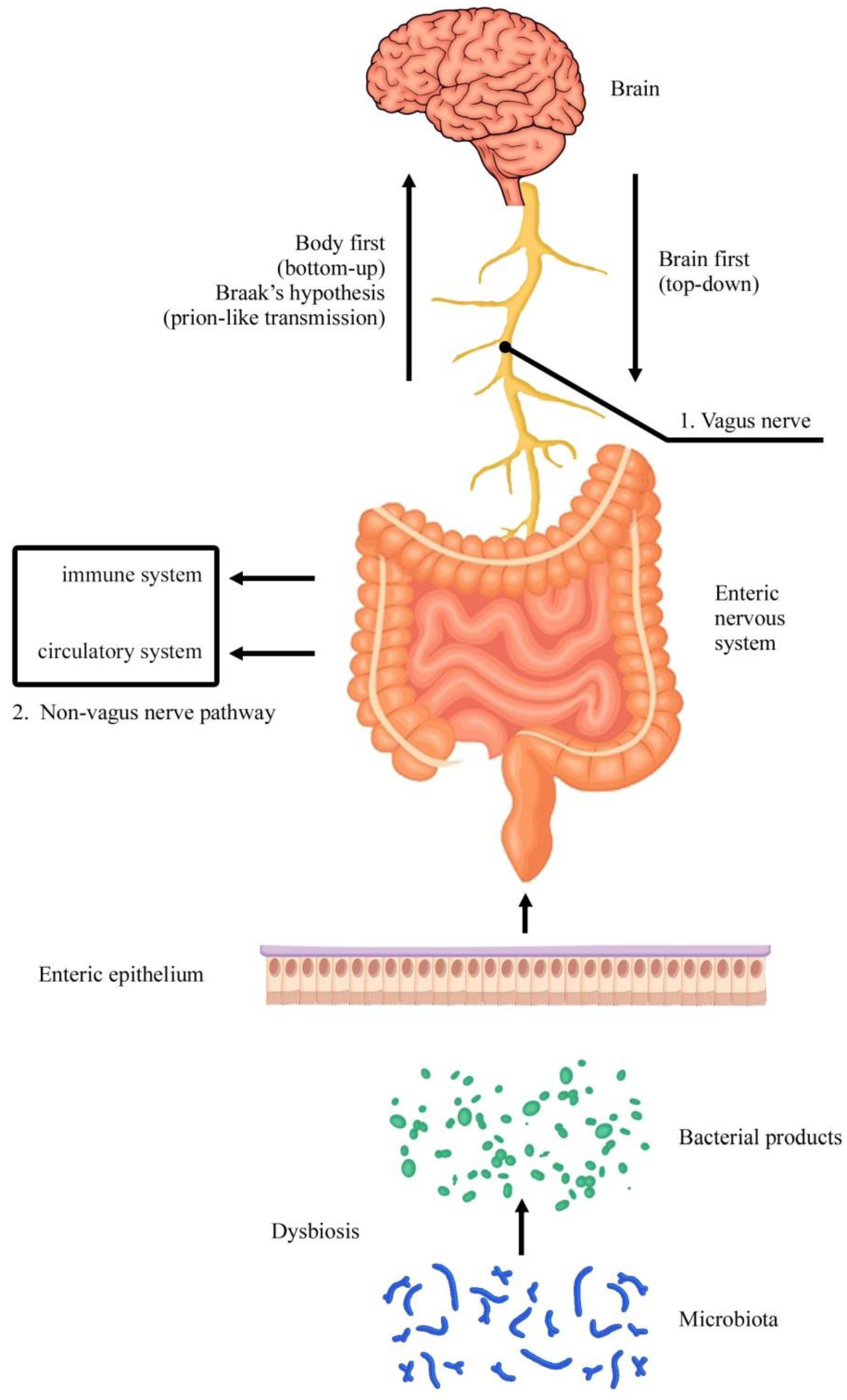
Braak's theory for Parkinson’s disease

=== Braak's hypothesis ===
Aggregated alpha-synuclein pathology in the GI ENS of PD patients was only unveiled in the 1980s. Within the GI tract, pathology has a rostral-caudal gradient pattern with no pathology in the upper esophagus to the most affected regions in lower esophagus (contributing to the swallowing symptoms) and the stomach, followed by sparse pathology in the colon. Autopsy studies performed in PD patients showed pathology in the DMNV, olfactory bulb and vagus nerve. Based on these findings, Braak et al. proposed a retrograde spreading of alpha-synuclein (known as Braak's theory), where the dysfunction of the gut (resulting from altered microbiota or other contributing factors discussed below) triggers the aggregation of alpha-synuclein within the gut prior to spreading to the brain. This was further supported by the decrease in PD risk with truncal vagotomy, a procedure that involves the cutting of the fibers in the vagus nerve that connect to the stomach. Additionally, many animal studies have shown the bi-directional movement of alpha-synuclein between the CNS and ENS. Alpha-synuclein can be detected in the visceral motor nerve terminals and the preganglionic vagus nerve after the overexpression of alpha-synuclein in the midbrain of rats. Conversely, injections of preformed fibrils (pathological alpha-synuclein) into the colon of mice induced pathological changes in endogenous alpha-synuclein in the brainstem.

=== Altered microbiota in PD ===
The microbiota, located throughout the GI tract, contains thousands of different microbial species that have evolved to form a mutualistic and symbiotic relationship with the host. The microbiota exhibits varies functions - structural, metabolic, and immune-based. Structurally, it maintains the intestinal barrier and regulates the growth of the epithelial cells. Metabolically, it is involved in the synthesis or degradation of many compounds, such as amino acids, vitamins, lipids, bile acids and indigestible food. It also regulates the immune response, protecting the host from pathogens. Gut dysbiosis occurs when there is an alteration in the composition of the gut microbiota that leads to a dysfunction and an unhealthy state.

An overgrowth of bacteria in the small intestine can metabolize levodopa into dopamine, preventing it from reaching the brain.

PD associated microbiota
| Name | Role in PD | Source |
|---|---|---|
| Aquabacterium | increase/ decrease motor complications | |
| Peptococcus | motor complications | |
| Sphingomonas | motor complications | |
| Proteobacteria | increase PD duration | |
| Firmicutes | decrease PD duration | |
| Lachnospiraceae | decrease PD duration | |
| Lactobacillus gasseri | increase PD duration | |
| Pasteurellaceae, Alcaligenaceae, and Fusobacteria | more abundant in early onset | |
| Comamonas and Anaerotruncus | more abundant in late onset | |
| Firmicutes | | |
| Prevotella | decrease associated with faster disease progression | |
| Ruminococcaceae | increases with PD duration, in patients with the disease for >10 years | |

=== Contributing factors of Microbiome-GBA Dysfunction in PD ===
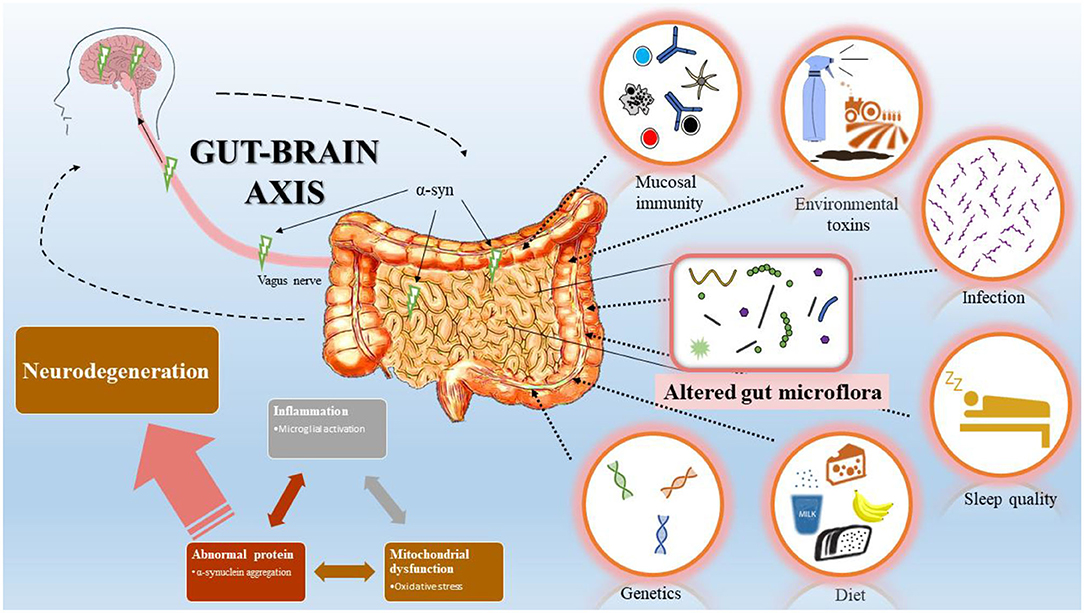
Proposed contributing Factors of Microbiome-GBA Dysfunction in PD (Braak’s hypothesis)

There are many key factors involved in the modulation and dysfunction of the microbiome-GBA in PD.

==== Genetics ====
Genome-wide association studies (GWAS) has linked several autosomal dominant (SNCA, LRRK2, GBA) and recessive (DJ-1, PINK1, PARK7, Parkin) mutations to the development of PD. However, there is variable penetrance in even the most common genetic risk factor of PD, LRRK, where <30% of carriers develop PD. This further suggests the involvement of other factors, such as the environment, in the increased vulnerability of developing the disease and in clinical presentation of symptoms of genetic forms of PD.

- LRRK2: LRRK2 is expressed by innate and adaptive immune cells as well as by enteric neurons in the small intestine. After exposure to certain enteric pathogens, LRRK2 modulates the intestinal inflammatory response via the secretion of anti-microbial components. This is also seen in patients with Crohn's Disease, where greater levels of LRRK2 are found in the colon. In in vitro studies, LRRK2 mutation (G2019S) results in changes in intestinal gene expression in epithelial cells associated with GI impairment.
- SNCA: many pathogens have been associated with SNCA genes
- PINK1 and PRKN: play role in clearance of damaged mitochondria and associated with PD mitochondria dysfunction. An infection with intestinal Gram-negative bacteria in mice containing no PINK1 results in an increased inflammatory response, dopaminergic degeneration and PD like motor symptoms.

==== Aging ====
Aging, a major risk factor of PD, results in alterations to the gut microbiota's biodiversity, which it increases from infancy to adult and begins to decline with age. There are many factors that contribute to this decline, such as the immune system, changes in lifestyle, the environment, medications, other diseases, and organ dysfunction. The decrease in biodiversity with age is associated with a decrease in intestinal epithelial barrier integrity, resulting in the leakage of neurotransmitters, lipopolysaccharide (LPS, an endotoxin found on Gram-negative bacteria), short-chain fatty acids (SCFA, a systemic anti-inflammatory) and bacterial antigens as well as the breakdown of the neuro-immune system.

==== Inflammation ====
Inflammation plays a critical role n PD. Intestinal and periphery inflammation further worsen the neuroinflammatory response on PD progression. Helicobacter pylori (HP) infection may play a role in the pathogenesis and symptomology of PD. HP occurs at a higher prevalence in PD and has been associated in some cases with more severe motor symptoms of the disease. Some studies showed an improvement of symptoms with the eradication of HP, while others reported a 45% increase risk of PD. The elimination of HP can also increase the bioavailability of L-dopa. Some PD patients have intestinal inflammation as well as a breakdown of the intestinal epithelial barrier integrity, markers of intestinal inflammation and barrier dysfunction Peripheral immune cells are found in the brains of patients with PD and

There are similarities with PD and inflammatory bowel disease (IBD) and irritable bowel syndrome (IBS).

==== Environmental toxins ====
There is an increased risk of PD with exposures to herbicides and pesticides on farms as well as bacteria found in drinking well water. Exposure to herbicides and pesticides in animal models result in movement disorder and the loss of dopaminergic neurons. In other animal studies, exposure to pesticide rotenone resulted in alpha synuclein being released from enteric neurons into the extracellular matrix. In vitro studies also showed that secreted alpha-synuclein can be undergo transneuronal retrograde movement, where it can be taken up by other neurons or non-neuronal cell types. Moreover, the gut of PD patients exposed to herbicides and pesticides showed an increase in xenobiotics degradation pathway.

==== Lifestyle ====
Food: There are many epidemiological studies that demonstrate the significant impact of diet on the onset and exacerbation of PD through its influence on the composition of the gut microbiota. There is a slower progression and incidence of PD with the consumption of a Mediterranean diet. Western diets have less dietary fibers and more fats and sugars, while Mediterranean diets consist of vegetables, nuts, fruits, whole grains, healthy fats, and vegetables. Diets rich in fiber increase bacteria that produce SCFA, which has anti-inflammatory effect.

Fluids: Caffeine drinkers and smokers have a decreased risk of PD, by 60% and 30%, respectively, potentially through the modulation of the gut-brain axis. The consumption of caffeine or smoking alters the microbiota composition, which may lower intestinal inflammation and decrease alpha-synuclein aggregation. This is further supported in animal and human studies that have demonstrated an increase of Bifidobacteria, which has anti-inflammatory effects, after coffee consumption. Other components of coffee, such as polyphenols, increase gut motility and regulate the microbiome. Caffeine antagonizes (blocks) the adenosine A2A receptor, resulting in a neuroprotective effect on dopaminergic neurons. Flavonoids (found in tea, red wine, oranges, apples and berry fruits) have antioxidant and antimicrobial properties and have been linked to a lower risk of PD. There is no association of PD risk and dairy products. There is a decrease risk and a Urate, a potent antioxidant, also results in a slower progression and risk of PD. There are many conflicting results on the association of alcohol and PD risk. While some studies report an increased risk, others studies demonstrate a decreased risk that may be dependent on the type of alcohol.

Exercise: has also been associated with enriching the microbiota with more beneficial bacteria, such as Erysipelotrichaceae, Roseburia, Clostridiales and Lachnospiraceae.

=== Targeting the Microbiota-GBA in PD ===
| Name | Type | Role or effect in PD | References |
|---|---|---|---|
| Rifampicin | Antibiotic | in vitro findings: stabilizes alpha-synuclein monomeric form, inhibits aggregation; prevent alpha-synuclein aggregation and increase cell viability with rifampicin pre-treatment prior to MPP+; protects against rotenone-induced cytotoxicity via the upregulation of glucose-regulated protein 78 (GRP78); in vivo findings: rifampicin pre-treatment reduced nigrostriatal dopaminergic cell neurodegeneration in MPTP mouse model | |
| Ceftriaxone | Antibiotic beta-lactum | neuroprotective | |
| Doxycycline | Antibiotic | in vitro findings: prevent fibrilization of alpha-synuclein; in vivo findings: prevent 6-OHDA neurotoxicity: decrease the activation of microglia and astrocyte via iNOs inhibition; neuroprotective on dopaminergic neurons: 1) prevent MPTP toxicity via a decrease the activation of microglia and astrocyte and 2) decrease MHCII (microglial major histocompatibility complex II) expression in LPS rat model | |
| Minocycline | Antibiotic | in vivo: neuroprotective: blocks the depletion of dopamine, limits dopaminergic neurodegeneration, has antioxidant and anti-inflammatory effects; re-balance gut dysbiosis through a decrease in the ration between Firmicutes Bacteroidetes; anti-depressant properties; In some animal models, minocycline has been shown to have a negative impact on PD | |
| Streptococcus salivarius, subsp. Thermophilus, Enterococcus faecium, Lactobacillus rhamnosus GG, Lactobacillus acidophilus, Lactobacillus plantarum, Lactobacillus paracasei, Lactobacillus delbrueckii, subsp. Bulgaricus and Bifidobacterium (fermented milk), Lactobacillus acidophilus, Lactobacillus reuteri, Lactobacillus gasseri, Lactobacillus rhamnosus, Bifidobacterium bifidum, Bifidobacterium longum, Enterococcus faecalis, Enterococcus faecium | Probiotic | In PD patients: Constipation symptoms improved | |
| Lactobacillus acidophilus, Bifidobacterium infantis | Probiotic | In PD patients: decreased abdominal pain and bloating | |
| Lactobacillus casei Shirota (fermented milk) | Probiotic | In PD patients: decreased abdominal pain and bloating, stool consistency improved | |
| | Prebiotic | | |
| Vitamin B3: Examples: niacin, nicotinic acid, nicotinamide); Found in: beans, mushrooms, enriched floor, fish, milk, meat | vitamin | in vivo findings: the administration of nicotinamide in drosophila flies with PINK1 mutations resulted in neuroprotection of dopaminergic neurons and the reversal of mitochondrial impairment | |
| Vitamin C: Found in: fresh fruits, vegetables | vitamin | inconclusive findings | |
| Vitamin E: Found in: vegetable oil and whole-grain cereal | vitamin | inconclusive findings | |
