= Parkinson's disease in South Asians =

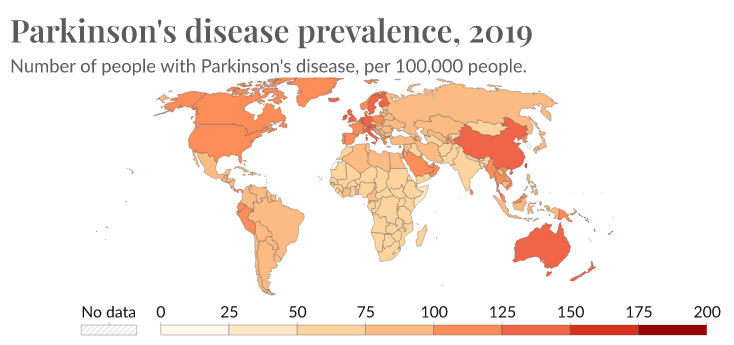
Worldwide prevalence rate of Parkinson's disease as of 2019

Epidemiological studies have shown lower age-related prevalence of Parkinson's disease in South Asians, with the rate of prevalence being around 52.7 per 100,000 as compared to a higher prevalence rate observed in populations with European origin, 108-257 per 100,000. Additionally, several studies have seen a higher prevalence of in women which contrasts with global data that observes an overall higher prevalence seen in men. Compared to most of the rest of the world, the South Asian countries (including India, Pakistan, Nepal, Bhutan, Maldives, Afghanistan, Sri Lanka, and Bangladesh) seem to be on the lower end of PD prevalence. However, this is not to say that PD is not of concern in these countries. Over the past couple of years, the rate of Parkinson's has gone up in South Asia meaning that it is of high importance to study this pathological disease in these populations.

== Background ==
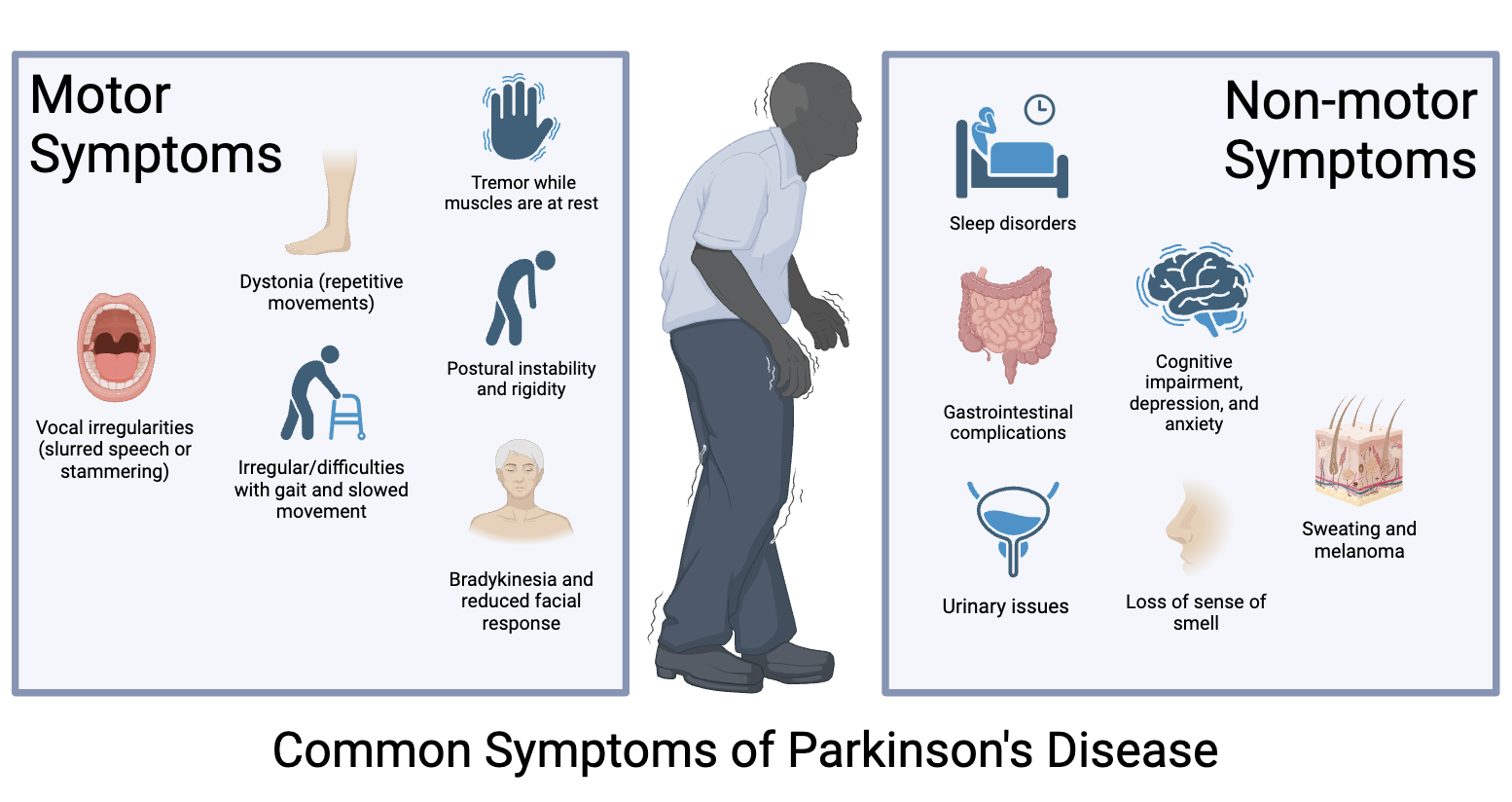
Common motor and non-motor symptomology observed in patients with PD

Parkinson's disease (PD) is a chronic neurodegenerative disorder caused by the progressive degeneration of dopamine-producing neurons in the substantia nigra, a structure located in the midbrain essential for reward and movement. The rapid deterioration of these dopaminergic neurons leads to both motor and non-motor complications. Being that they are quite visible, the motor symptoms are usually used as a preliminary basis for the diagnosis of PD, particularly deterioration of voluntary movements along with muscular rigidity. Tremor, postural instability, dystonia, and speech disturbances are among the most common motor symptoms in PD cases and are heavily researched in an effort to develop efficient methods of management. Conversely, the non-motor symptoms, including cognitive decline, depression, and sleep disturbances, are not as rigorously studied. Many of these complications develop prior to motor symptoms as early as 10 years before a formal diagnosis and tend to become comparatively more cumbersome as the disease advances. Although, in general, the exact cause of PD is unknown, it is likely that both genetics and environment are contributing factors. Along with around 90 genetic risk variants which account for 16-36% of non-monogenic PD, additional variables such as being a non-smoker can influence the risk a given person has for developing PD.

== Pathology ==
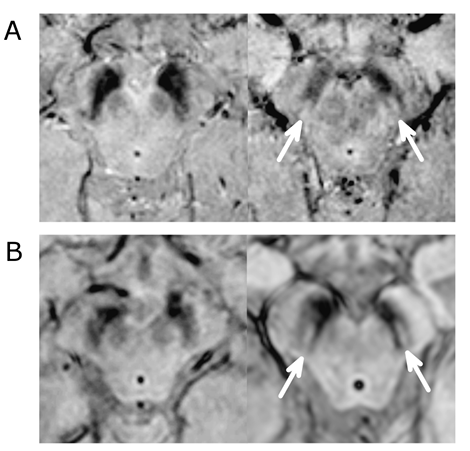
Compared volume of the substantia nigra between a patient with PD and without PD

Substantial loss of melanized dopaminergic neurons in the substantia nigra pars compacta (SNpc) is a major characteristic of PD pathogenesis. Many studies have shown that differential prevalence of PD between ethnic groups is due to differences in the number of melanized neurons in the substantia nigra. Most Indians, compared to populations with European origin, have around 40% lower in number of melanized nigral neurons, however, they also tend not to lose these neurons with age. Although Indians do have a lower SNpc volume, this population tends to have a higher neuronal density as well as number of neurons which is hypothesized to be the reason for a lower incidence rate of PD, but this needs to be expanded upon.

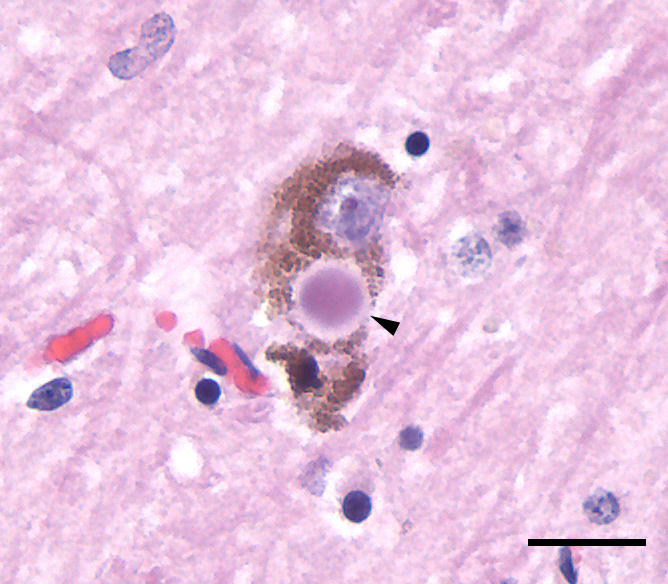
Lewy body in the SNpc of a patient with PD

Another hallmark of PD pathology is the development of Lewy bodies (LBs) in dopaminergic neurons which are protein aggregates that impair neuronal function. A major component of the structure of these LBs is α-synuclein which becomes phosphorylated followed by aggregation in pathological conditions. Under normal conditions, α-synuclein remains mostly unfolded with some parts of the protein folded into α-helical structures, however, in PD, it assumes a β-sheet amyloid structure which is highly susceptible to aggregation. Due to dietary differences, South Asians tend to consume higher levels of curcumin, a strong anti-oxidant and anti-inflammatory agent, which has been observed to attentuate α-synuclein aggregation. However, variation in LB and α-synuclein pathologies in the South Asian population is heavily under studied and needs to be further elucidated.

== Ethnic research limitations ==
Similar to many other diseases, genetic risk factors for PD have been and still are investigated through genome-wide association studies (GWAS). Although the GWAS database has revolutionized genetic studies, they are not an accurate representation of the global population's genetic diversity as most of the samples in these datasets are from populations with European backgrounds. Specifically in Parkinson's, most implicated genes that have been associated with both familial and monogenic forms of PD are prevalent in persons of European descent. Additionally, many of the newly found risk variants screened through GWAS that have been associated with around 25% of the disease heritability are mainly from studies that included only individuals of European ancestry. A lack of diversity in PD research limits the relevance of these findings towards populations of other ethnicities.

== Diagnosis ==
Diagnosis for Parkinson's is based on a defined criteria and is usually, as mentioned, based on the first motor symptoms. This includes slowness of initiating voluntary movements and bradykinesia along with one more symptom including tremor or muscular rigidity. Any symptoms that could indicate other diseases, such as parkinsonian syndrome, have to be excluded in the screening process as they have different pathological effects compared to PD. Additionally, there needs to be at least three criteria present such as unilateral onset, persistent asymmetry affecting the onset side more, and a positive response towards treatment with levodopa.

Epidemiological differences in PD cases are affected by average knowledge of Parkinson's among populations. Due to a lack of symptom awareness, Parkinson's is oftentimes under-reported in South Asian populations. A study looking into PD knowledge in Asia found that there was not as much awareness regarding non-motor symptoms in the Indian population as compared to East Asian populations. Additionally, Indians were not aware that tremor is not a required symptom to be diagnosed with Parkinson's disease. It is also noted that South Asians, especially the Indian subcontinent has been having younger age of onset of Parkinson's disease as compared to global average. This gap is predicted as high as a decade earlier which is reflected in various recent publications. Because diagnosis partly relies on self-reporting symptoms, this gap in knowledge can make it difficult to get an accurate representation of the variation within the South Asian population as well as become a barrier toward understanding how this disease manifests differently.

== Ethnic variation ==
From studies looking at Parkinson's in South Asian populations, ethnic variation has been observed in both motor and non-motor symptomology. These populations seem to be more prone towards experiencing a rigid-akinetic dominant phenotype of this disease as opposed to the tremor-dominant phenotype meaning there is a slowness of movement initiation along with stiffness of muscle tone. The rigid-akinetic phenotype has been linked with a higher risk of both cognitive dysfunction and motor decline. Non-motor symptoms (NMS) have been sparsely studied in South Asian PD patients including a couple of studies looking at the incidence rates of some common NMSs in Pakistan.

Incidence rates of non-motor symptoms between ethnic groups
Country	Total participants	Drooling (%)	Constipation (%)	Hyperhidrosis (%)	Insomnia (%)	Urinary urgency (%)	Depression (%)	Anxiety (%)
Pakistan	97	37	60	37	53	62	52	40
United States	70	27	30	19	41	59	38	36
United Kingdom	158	55	42	10	18	46	37	42

== Contributors to ethnic variation ==
=== Genetic ===
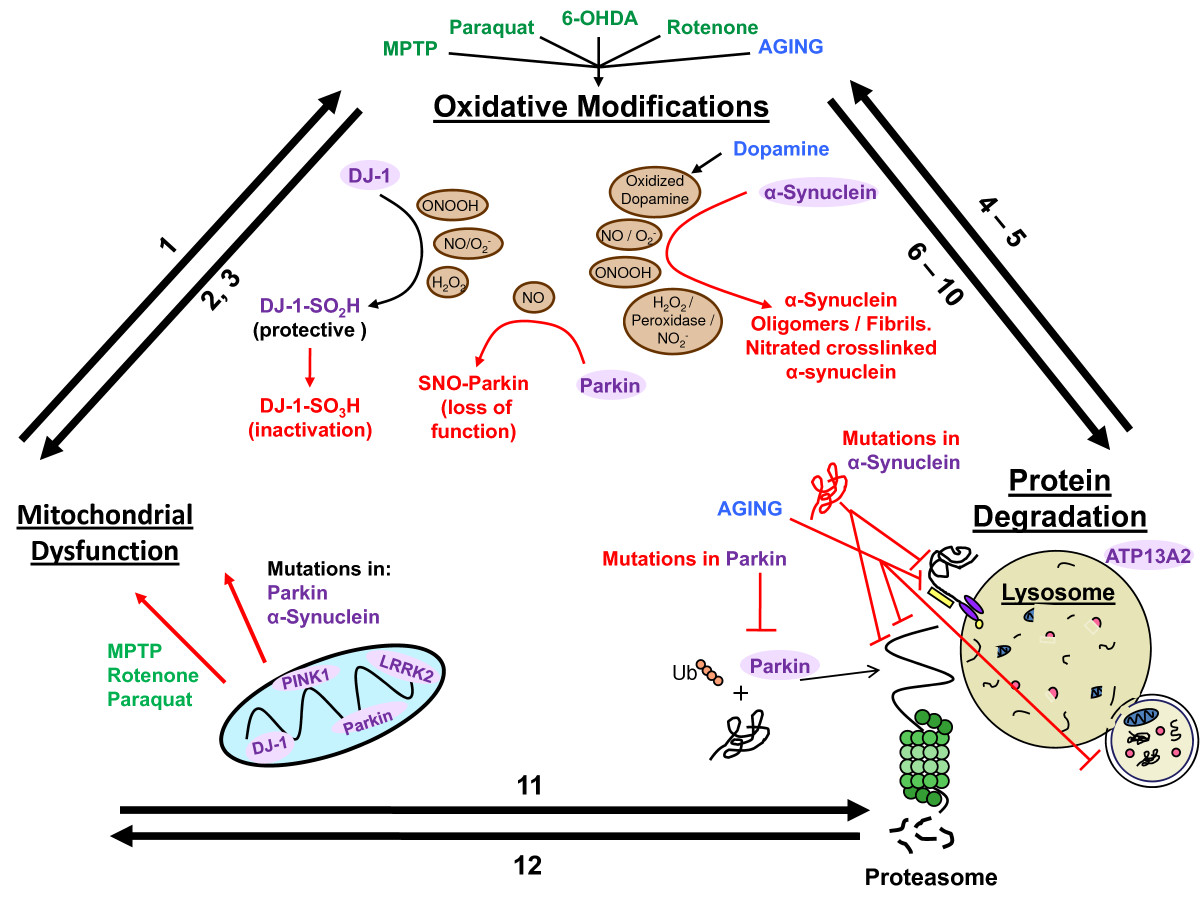
Contributions of genetic risk factors towards exacerbating Parkinson's Disease

There are many genes that are implicated in PD with each one being differentially prevalent between populations. Initial works on genetics for Parkinson's disease in south Asia were limited. In last few years large scale studies are going on, which are giving more instights into the genetics understanding and variations in South Asian Populations. Along with many others, the following genes have been implicated in PD in South Asian populations with further understanding of Polygenic Risk Scores.

==== Glucocerebrosidase (GBA) ====
The GBA gene encodes for glucocerebrosidase (GCase) which is a lysosomal enzyme that breaks down glucosylceramide into glucose. In the context of Parkinson's, mutations in GBA occur at a higher frequency than other genes indicated in PD. Although the exact mechanism of mutant GBA and its contributions towards PD has not been elucidated as of yet, there are proposed mechanisms that mutations in this gene might be gain-of-function or loss-of-function. In general, it is likely that mutant GBA accumulates and affects lysosomal function leading to dysregulation of autophagic pathways which is essential for the degradation of α-synuclein in dopaminergic neurons. Only a few studies have examined the prevalence of GBA variants in South Asian populations with most looking at Indian patients. Most of these studies have shown that, compared to populations with European backgrounds, GBA variants are not as common in Indian populations. Among all of the GBA variants, Indian patients carrying the p. Leu444Pro mutant have observed to have an earlier onset of PD as well as a positive family history. However, even then, the frequency of this mutant is quite low which points towards the possibility that the p. Leu444Pro variant, and GBA mutants in general, have a limited role in the pathogenesis of PD in Indian populations.

==== PARKIN ====
Encoded by the PARK2 gene, the PARKIN protein is a ubiquitin ligase that is indicated in protein processing as well as degradation and is essential for the quality control of proteins. Mutations in PARKIN have led to a loss-of-function resulting in an accumulation of the ligase's substrate causing the degradation of dopaminergic neurons in the substantia nigra. Importantly, these mutations have been the most common cause of autosomal recessive early-onset PD (EOPD) in familial disease with the estimated frequency being 50%. Comparatively, prevalence of mutations in PARKIN, looking at specifically the Indian population, contributing to EOPD was 10% in familial cases and 25% in autosomal recessive cases. The PARK2 gene itself is highly polymorphic with its pathological variants being highly prevalent. The G1239C and G1281A variants, specifically, exist at high frequencies and both interfere with the binding efficiency of PARKIN to its substrate.

Dysregulation of PARK1 and PARK4 caused by mutations in the α-synuclein (SNCA) gene accounts for 1.7-2.7% of familial Parkinson's and 0.3% of spontaneously occurring PD. In South Asian studies, focusing on Indian populations, there were no observed instances of PD patients with mutations in the SNCA gene. In general, it seems to be that populations with Indian descent do not seem to have as much of an incidence of PARKIN mutations as compared to that of other populations; although, these studies can be expanded upon in order to be relevant to other South Asian countries.

==== LRRK2 ====
Leucine-rich repeat kinase 2 (LRRK2) plays a role in the phosphorylation of Rab GTPases which consequently regulates vesicular trafficking. Dysfunction of the LRRK2 due to a mutation in its gene has been linked with being a genetic risk factor for familial and sporadic forms of PD as well as causing autosomal dominant late onset forms of PD. High activity of pathogenic LRRK2 is associated with dopaminergic neuronal death, defects in protein synthesis, oxidative damage among others. Variants of this kinase, specifically the p.G2019S mutant, are reported to be differentially prevalent among populations, but in most Asian populations, including South Asia, these mutations are reported to be absent. However, in more recent studies that have more comprehensively screened the genome of multiple ethnic populations found four novel LRRK2 variants specific to the Indian population, granted the significance of these mutants have not yet been assessed.

Differential impact of dysregulated genes between ethnic groups
Gene mutation	Function impacted	European populations	South Asian populations	References
p. Leu444Pro (GBA)	Lysosomal enzyme that works to break down glucosylceramide into glucose	One of the most common mutations indicated in PD pathogenesis	Less common, but linked with earlier onset of PD and a positive family history	
G1239C (PARKIN)	Ubiquitin ligase indicated in protein processing (important for quality control of proteins)	Both polymorphisms are significantly associated with sporadic and familial PD	Associated with PD susceptibility	
G1281A (PARKIN)	Ubiquitin ligase indicated in protein processing (important for quality control of proteins)	Both polymorphisms are significantly associated with sporadic and familial PD	Less prevalence	
p.A53T (SNCA)	Ubiquitin ligase indicated in protein processing (important for quality control of proteins)	Increased risk for autosomal-dominant PD	Rare prevalence	
p.G2019S (LRRK2)	Regulates intracellular trafficking and neurite outgrowth	Highly associated with familial and sporadic PD	Rare prevalence	

=== Non-genetic ===
==== Environment ====
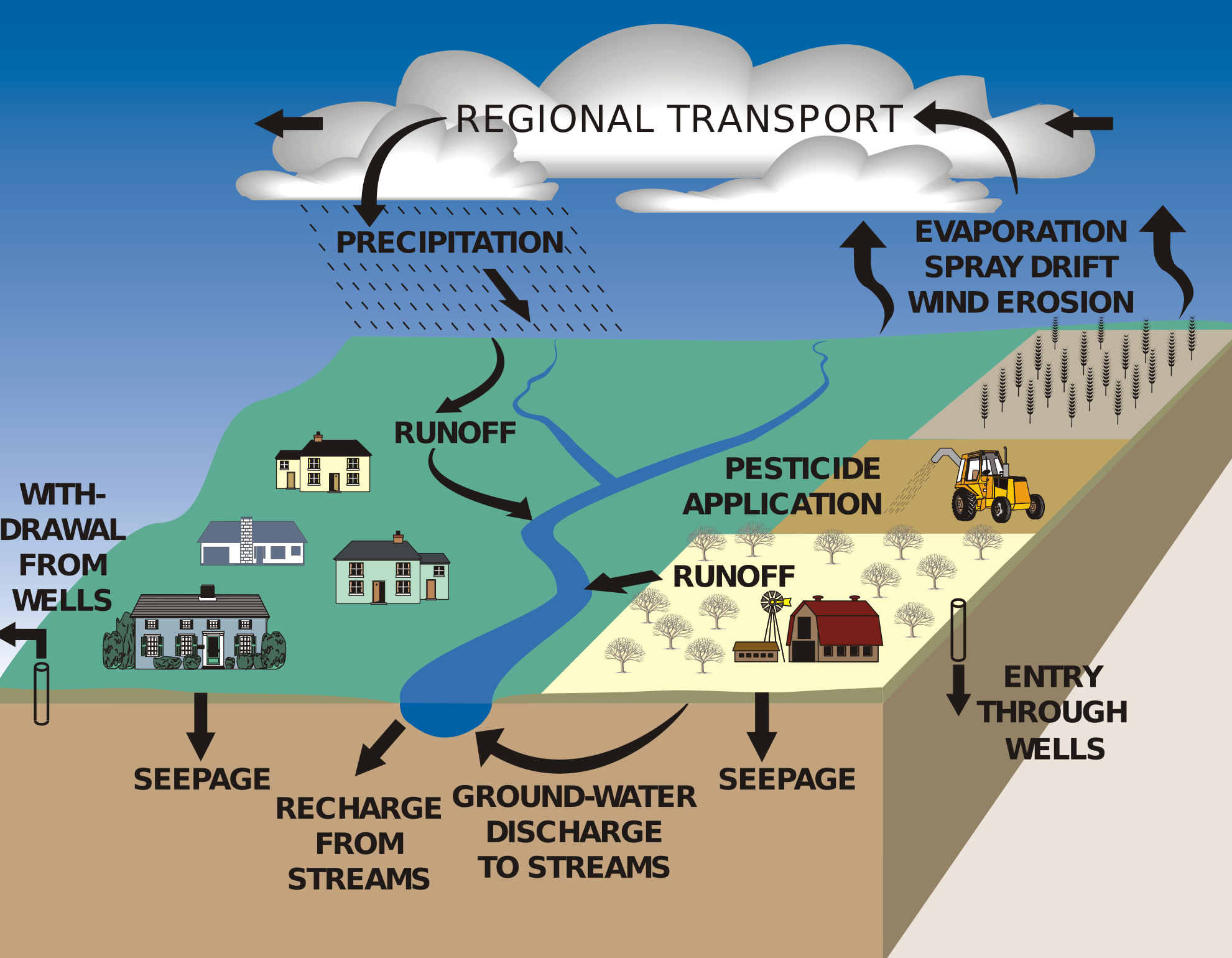
Movement of pesticides into ground water supplied wells

A large percentage of the population in South Asia live in rural areas where there is a higher chance of exposure to potential neurotoxins such as pesticides from farming and water sources. Wells, specifically, are a common source of drinking water in these areas and are usually more likely to be susceptible to contamination from neurotoxins. The water that fills these wells can act as a host for infectious agents and pesticides that concentrate the groundwater from the soil. Although not significant, there is an observed heightened risk for developing PD associated with populations that rely on wells as their primary source of water.

Farming along with working with farm animals is another potential source of neurotoxicity and has a significant increased risk for PD. Due to the lighter clothing that farmers opt to wear as well as the longer duration of exposure to both humidity and high temperatures, pesticides are more readily absorbed through the skin in addition to being inhaled.

==== Diet ====
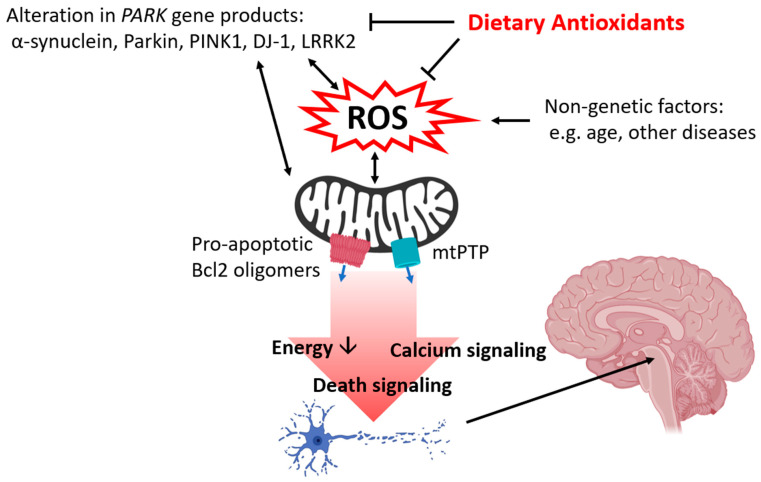
Protective role of dietary antioxidants in PD

It has been speculated that differences in food consumption is a contributing factor for differential prevalence of PD. Specifically, South Asian food is rich in anti-oxidants which has been minimally studied, but thought to potentially play a protective role in Parkinson's. In addition to its anti-oxidant properties, curcumin, found in turmeric, has been shown to direct free radical scavenging along with other protective roles. It was shown that in MTPT treated mice which developed Parkinson-like pathology, curcumin was able to reverse the depletion of striatal dopaminergic neurons. This anti-oxidant also has been shown to greatly inhibit the activity of monoamine oxidase-B which in turn works to increase dopamine levels.

==== Cultural and social factors ====
Cultural values and attitudes toward PD can contribute toward variation in mostly non-motor symptoms between different ethnic groups. Compared to Europe and the US, South Asian social issues are quite different. It is observed that a lower quality of life in Indian PD patients has been linked with depression, cognitive impairment, and a worsening of disease intensity among other factors. Indian women with PD have perceived their quality of life as worse compared to that of their male counterparts as they are expected to fully take care of the household even with a PD diagnosis. On the other hand, Indian men with PD received more attention from family and friends, however, they tended to not confide in anyone close to them about their struggles in light of a PD diagnosis. Conversations surrounding mental health are highly stigmatized in South Asian countries and as a result, depression as a symptom is often overlooked especially in the elderly population. Additionally, socioeconomic factors can play a role in limiting access to advanced care and personalized treatment options as well as increased mortality rates, however, this aspect needs to be investigated in South Asian populations.

==== Smoking/chewing tobacco ====
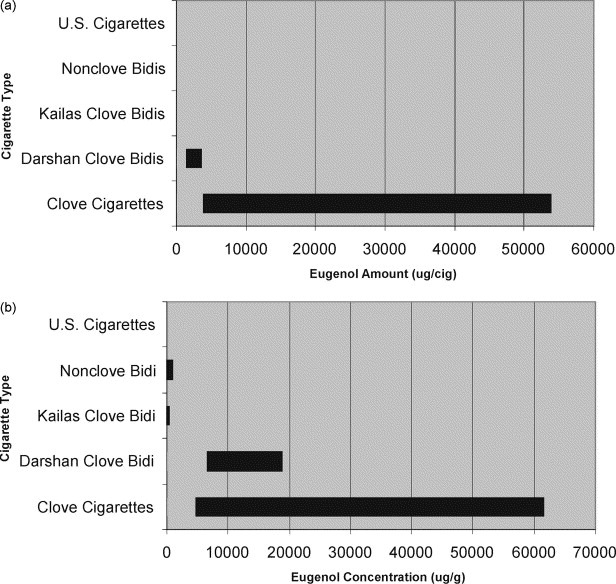
Differences in nicotine concentrations between cigarettes in USA and in South Asia

Tobacco has been observed to have a protective effect from PD with a potential five times decrease in risk. Studies looking at the relationship between Parkinson's and nicotine in populations with European origin found a strong negative association. In the South Asian region, a lower-grade tobacco, also called bidi, is popular in rural areas as well as among the urban poor. Bidi differs from tobacco smoked in Western societies in its concentration of nicotine in addition to 2-3 times greater nicotine inhalation when smoked. It has been suggested that the higher concentrations of carbon monoxide, nicotine, ammonia, and tar in bidi could have more of a protective effect as compared to tobacco.

=== Co-morbidities ===
Patients with diseases that are co-morbid with PD usually have a differential phenotypic expression compared to patients with solely Parkinson's. Due to this, it is imperative for these patients to receive treatment that takes into account the symptoms of these co-morbid diseases. Depending on the ethnic population, certain diseases are more prevalent than others which is another factor that can determine the ethnic variation observed in PD.

==== Type 2 diabetes mellitus ====
Compared to other populations, South Asian populations tend to have a higher prevalence rate of type 2 diabetes mellitus (T2DM) due to certain biological risk factors including differences in pathophysiology, specifically increased susceptibility to insulin resistance and earlier declines in β-cell function. Although studies have yet to be conducted in South Asian populations, there has been some evidence that T2DM is associated with increased risk for developing PD. Specifically, T2DM has been linked with escalating the rate of progression of motor symptoms along with weaker support for the progression of cognitive symptoms.

Biologically, the pathways of both diseases are thought to be intertwined. It has been suggested that α-synuclein aggregates at a faster rate in the presence of islet amyloid polypeptide (IAPP) aggregates, which are present in pancreatic cells in T2DM. Additionally, insulin resistance is able to affect pathways that relate to synaptic plasticity, neuroinflammation, and mitochondrial dysfunction, all of which are implicated in PD pathogenesis. Hyperglycemia, one of the results of insulin resistance and poor glucose regulation, can lead to mitochondrial dysfunction in the SNpc dopaminergic neurons and therefore, a high production of reactive free hydroxyl radicals which is particularly damaging to this area of the brain.

==== Cardiovascular disease ====
Cardiovascular disease (CVD) is an umbrella term for a group of diseases, including coronary heart disease (CHD) and stroke, involving the heart or blood vessels. Around 40% of the global CVD burden comes from South Asians in addition to these populations being at a higher risk of developing CVD at an earlier age compared to those with European ancestry. There are a couple of reasons that are thought to contribute to this increase in CVD risk within this population. Factors that are in high prevalence such as LDL cholesterol, lack of exercise, and as mentioned, diabetes, along with social factors including poverty and long working hours can exacerbate the risk of developing CVD. Studies have shown that South Asian children are more likely to work manual jobs and be at risk of being exposed to biological risk factors as compared to their European counterparts.

The pathways that contribute to the pathologies of both CVD and PD overlap quite a bit. For example, dysregulation of lipid metabolism, particularly high concentrations of plasma sphingolipid ceramide, is linked with cardiovascular death and has also observed in altered concentrations in PD brain tissue postmortem. Additionally, ceramide has been seen to be in higher percentages in patients with dementia as compared to healthy controls likely due to mutations in the SMPD1 gene. This gene encodes for sphingomyelinase, an enzyme that hydrolyzes sphingolipids into ceramide and is also implicated in the regulation of α-synuclein. This would need to be further expanded upon, however, these findings suggest a link between modification of α-synuclein expression and changes in ceramide abundance that contribute to both CVD and PD.

In addition to both of these diseases having many overlapping risk factors and pathways, it has been suggested that PD can increase the likelihood of cardiovascular disease as well as an increased risk of a PD diagnosis in stroke patients. This could be explained by vascular changes and ischemic brain damage, however, the pathophysiological explanation is yet to be discerned. For South Asian populations, this link is highly relevant in light of their excessive exposure to risk factors contributing to CVD which can result in variation in PD cases.

== Treatment ==
As there is no cure for Parkinson's disease, current therapies work more to manage motor and non-motor symptoms instead of halting or reversing the progression of this disease. These therapeutics, which include dopamine receptor agonists, levodopa, COMT inhibitors, MAO-B inhibitors, and anticholinergics, work to increase concentrations of dopamine in the brain via different pathways. The "gold standard" treatment for Parkinson's is levodopa, however this drug can result in differences in motor responses in as high as 50% of PD patients. One of the major consequences of sustained levodopa treatment is the "on-off" phenomenon where the therapeutic window becomes smaller. In order to counteract this adverse effect, usually the dosage of levodopa is adjusted and strategic breaks in treatment are implemented.

In general, heterogeneity among PD patients due to both genetic and non-genetic factors leads to differences in responses towards therapeutics. Because South Asians are more susceptible towards experiencing the rigid-akinetic phenotype of Parkinson's disease, these populations experience a range of motor and non-motor symptoms that differ from other populations. Due to this, treatment regimens that take into account this variability are required, however, this remains an area that needs to be further researched.

The pattern of treatment for Parkinson's disease vary across the globe albeit same medications / interventions are used. This is based upon availability, cost, tolerability, and genetic factors. Levodopa Equivalent Daily Dosage (LEDD) is a standardized method to cross compare the utilization of different medications across different patients / groups of patients. In a recently published article involving multiple countries and continents, it was clearly noted that South Asians (especially) Indians along with Thailands have the highest LEDD utilization, showing a disparity in dosages of medications used among different geographical areas. These studies need to be further validated by looking into genetic patterns for underlying mechanism.

== See also ==
- Air pollution
- DDT | MPP+ | MPTP | Paraquat | Rotenone
- Heavy metals
- Parkinson's disease and gut-brain axis
- Trichloroethylene
