= Diabetic cardiomyopathy =

- Universal blue circle symbol for diabetes.
- Specialty: Cardiology

Diabetic cardiomyopathy is a disorder of the heart muscle in people with diabetes. It can lead to inability of the heart to circulate blood through the body effectively, a state known as heart failure (HF), with accumulation of fluid in the lungs (pulmonary edema) or legs (peripheral edema). Most heart failure in people with diabetes results from coronary artery disease, and diabetic cardiomyopathy is only said to exist if there is no coronary artery disease to explain the heart muscle disorder.

== Signs and symptoms ==
One particularity of diabetic cardiomyopathy is the long latent phase, during which the disease progresses but is completely asymptomatic. In most cases, diabetic cardiomyopathy is detected with concomitant hypertension or coronary artery disease. One of the earliest signs is mild left ventricular diastolic dysfunction with little effect on ventricular filling. Also, the diabetic patient may show subtle signs of diabetic cardiomyopathy related to decreased left ventricular compliance or left ventricular hypertrophy or a combination of both. A prominent "a" wave can also be noted in the jugular venous pulse, and the cardiac apical impulse may be overactive or sustained throughout systole. After the development of systolic dysfunction, left ventricular dilation and symptomatic heart failure, the jugular venous pressure may become elevated, the apical impulse would be displaced downward and to the left. Systolic mitral murmur is not uncommon in these cases. These changes are accompanied by a variety of electrocardiographic changes that may be associated with diabetic cardiomyopathy in 60% of patients without structural heart disease, although usually not in the early asymptomatic phase. Later in the progression, a prolonged QT interval may be indicative of fibrosis. Given that diabetic cardiomyopathy's definition excludes concomitant atherosclerosis or hypertension, there are no changes in perfusion or in atrial natriuretic peptide levels up until the very late stages of the disease, when the hypertrophy and fibrosis become very pronounced.

== Pathophysiology ==
Defects in cellular processes such as autophagy and mitophagy are thought to contribute to the development of diabetic cardiomyopathy. Diabetic cardiomyopathy is characterized functionally by ventricular dilation, enlargement of heart cells, prominent interstitial fibrosis and decreased or preserved systolic function in the presence of a diastolic dysfunction.

While it has been evident for a long time that the complications seen in diabetes are related to the hyperglycemia associated to it, several factors have been implicated in the pathogenesis of the disease. Etiologically, four main causes are responsible for the development of heart failure in diabetic cardiomyopathy: microangiopathy and related endothelial dysfunction, autonomic neuropathy, metabolic/lipidomic alterations (abnormal glucose use, increased fatty acid oxidation), generation and accumulation of free radicals, and alterations in ion homeostasis, especially calcium transients. Additional effects include inflammation and upregulation of local angiotensin systems.

Diabetic cardiomyopathy may be associated with restrictive (HFpEF) and dilated phenotypes (HFrEF). HFpEF results predominantly from hyperinsulinemia, hyperglycemia, lipotoxicity, AGEs and microvascular rarefication. HFrEF is associated with autoimmunity, hyperglycemia, lipotoxicity, microvascular rarefication and AGE formation.

=== Microangiopathy ===
Microangiopathy can be characterized as subendothelial and endothelial fibrosis in the coronary microvasculature of the heart. This endothelial dysfunction leads to impaired myocardial blood flow reserve as evidence by echocardiography. About 50% of diabetics with diabetic cardiomyopathy show pathologic evidence for microangiopathy such as sub-endothelial and endothelial fibrosis, compared to only 21% of non-diabetic heart failure patients. Over the years, several hypotheses were postulated to explain the endothelial dysfunction observed in diabetes. It was hypothesized that the extracellular hyperglycemia leads to an intracellular hyperglycemia in cells unable to regulate their glucose uptake, most predominantly, endothelial cells. Indeed, while hepatocytes and myocytes have mechanisms allowing them to internalize their glucose transporter, endothelial cells do not possess this ability. The consequences of increased intracellular glucose concentration are fourfold, all resulting from increasing concentration of glycolytic intermediates upstream of the rate-limiting glyceraldehyde-3-phosphate reaction which is inhibited by mechanisms activated by increased free radical formation, common in diabetes. Four pathways, enumerated below all explain part of the diabetic complications. First, it has been widely reported since the 1960s that hyperglycemia causes an increase in the flux through aldose reductase and the polyol pathway. Increased activity of the detoxifying aldose reductase enzyme leads to a depletion of the essential cofactor NADH, thereby disrupting crucial cell processes. Second, increasing fructose 6-phosphate, a glycolysis intermediate, will lead to increased flux through the hexosamine pathway. This produces N-acetyl glucosamine that can add on serine and threonine residues and alter signaling pathways as well as cause pathological induction of certain transcription factors. Third, hyperglycemia causes an increase in diacylglycerol, which is also an activator of the Protein Kinase C (PKC) signaling pathway. Induction of PKC causes multiple deleterious effects, including but not limited to blood flow abnormalities, capillary occlusion and pro-inflammatory gene expression. Finally, glucose, as well as other intermediates such as fructose and glyceraldehyde-3-phosphate, when present in high concentrations, promote the formation of advanced glycation endproducts (AGEs). These, in turn, can irreversibly cross link to proteins and cause intracellular aggregates that cannot be degraded by proteases and thereby, alter intracellular signalling. Also, AGEs can be exported to the intercellular space where they can bind AGE receptors (RAGE). This AGE/RAGE interaction activates inflammatory pathways such as NF-κB, in the host cells in an autocrine fashion, or in macrophages in a paracrine fashion. Neutrophil activation can also lead to NAD(P)H oxidase production of free radicals further damaging the surrounding cells. Finally, exported glycation products bind extracellular proteins and alter the matrix, cell-matrix interactions and promote fibrosis. A major source of increased myocardial stiffness is crosslinking between AGEs and collagen. In fact, a hallmark of uncontrolled diabetes is glycated products in the serum and can be used as a marker for diabetic microangiopathy.

=== Autonomic neuropathy ===
While the heart can function without help from the nervous system, it is highly innervated with autonomic nerves, regulating the heart beat according to demand in a fast manner, prior to hormonal release. The autonomic innervations of the myocardium in diabetic cardiomyopathy are altered and contribute to myocardial dysfunction. Unlike the brain, the peripheral nervous system does not benefit from a barrier protecting it from the circulating levels of glucose. Just like endothelial cells, nerve cells cannot regulate their glucose uptake and suffer the same type of damages listed above. Therefore, the diabetic heart shows clear denervation as the pathology progresses. This denervation correlates with echocardiographic evidence of diastolic dysfunction and results in a decline of survival in patients with diabetes from 85% to 44%. Other causes of denervation are ischemia from microvascular disease and thus appear following the development of microangiopathy.

=== Inflammation ===
Diabetes is associated with increased inflammation, which is mediated by generation of abnormal fatty acids, AGEs and other mechanisms. The resulting cytokine profile promotes hypertrophy and apoptosis of cardiomyocytes, abnormal calcium signaling, impaired myocardial contractility and myocardial fibrosis. Additionally, it may lead to microvascular dysfunction, either directly or via endothelial damage, thereby promoting myocardial ischemia.

== Diagnosis ==
Diagnostic approaches for diabetic cardiomyopathy include echocardiography, cardiac MRI investigations, Multi‐slice computed tomography (MsCT), and nuclear imaging. Potential risks of the investigation (e.g. exposure to radiation) and diagnostic utility should be weighed for an optimised personalised procedure.

== Treatment ==
At present, there is no effective specific treatment available for diabetic cardiomyopathy. Treatment rationale centers around intense glycemic control through diet and preferential use of certain medications in diabetic patients at high risk for developing cardiovascular disease or heart failure. A rationale for therapeutic decision making in individuals with coexistent diabetes mellitus and HF is less clear because there is a possibility that additional factors beyond glycemia might contribute to the increased HF risk in diabetes mellitus. Thiazolidinediones are not recommended in patients with NYHA Class III or IV heart failure secondary to fluid retention.

As with most other heart diseases, ACE inhibitors can also be administered. An analysis of major clinical trials shows that diabetic patients with heart failure benefit from such a therapy to a similar degree as non-diabetics. Similarly, beta blockers are also common in the treatment of heart failure concurrently with ACE inhibitors.
