= PARL =

Protein-coding gene in the species Homo sapiens

Identifiers
- Aliases: PARL, PSARL, PSARL1, PSENIP2, RHBDS1, PRO2207, presenilin associated rhomboid like
- External IDs: OMIM: 607858; MGI: 1277152; GeneCards: PARL
Enzyme activity
EC #	BRENDA	ExPASy	KEGG	MetaCyc
3.4.21.105	↗	↗	↗	↗

Gene location (Human)
Chr.	Chromosome 3 (human)
Band	3q27.1	Start	183,829,271 bp
Band	3q27.1	End	183,884,933 bp

Gene location (Mouse)
Chr.	Chromosome 16 (mouse)
Band	16 A3|16 12.4 cM	Start	20,098,568 bp
Band	16 A3|16 12.4 cM	End	20,121,137 bp
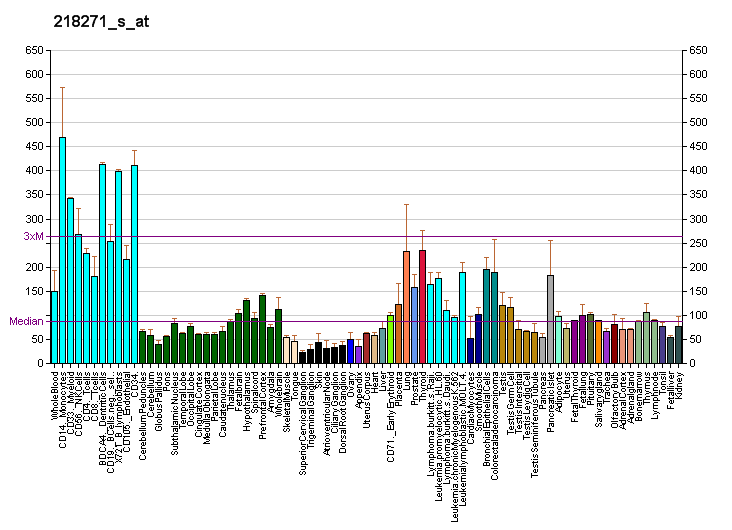
RNA expression pattern
Bgee	Human / Mouse (ortholog); Top expressed in: monocyte; olfactory zone of nasal mucosa; thymus; apex of heart; muscle layer of sigmoid colon; body of pancreas; gastric mucosa; putamen; mucosa of transverse colon; tibial arteries / Top expressed in: primary oocyte; embryonic cell; zygote; secondary oocyte; yolk sac; epiblast; otic vesicle; proximal tubule; epidermis; zone of skin; More reference expression data
BioGPS	More reference expression data
Gene ontology
Molecular function	peptidase activity; serine-type peptidase activity; protein binding; hydrolase activity; serine-type endopeptidase activity; endopeptidase activity
Cellular component	integral component of membrane; mitochondrial inner membrane; membrane; nucleus; mitochondrion
Biological process	regulation of reactive oxygen species metabolic process; regulation of protein targeting to mitochondrion; regulation of proteolysis; proteolysis; membrane protein proteolysis; regulation of mitochondrion organization; mitochondrial calcium ion transmembrane transport
Sources:Amigo / QuickGO
Orthologs
Databases	NCBI: entry; OMA: entry
Species	Human	Mouse
Entrez	55486	381038
Ensembl	ENSG00000175193	ENSMUSG00000033918
UniProt	Q9H300	Q5XJY4
RefSeq (mRNA)	NM_001037639; NM_001037640; NM_018622; NM_001324436; NM_001324437 NM_001324438	NM_001005767
RefSeq (protein)	NP_001032728; NP_001311365; NP_001311366; NP_001311367; NP_061092	NP_001005767
Location (UCSC)	Chr 3: 183.83 – 183.88 Mb	Chr 16: 20.1 – 20.12 Mb
PubMed search
- Wikidata
View/Edit Human	View/Edit Mouse

Presenilins-associated rhomboid-like protein, mitochondrial (PSARL), also known as PINK1/PGAM5-associated rhomboid-like protease (PARL), is an inner mitochondrial membrane protein that in humans is encoded by the PARL gene on chromosome 3. It is a member of the rhomboid family of intramembrane serine proteases. This protein is involved in signal transduction and apoptosis, as well as neurodegenerative diseases and type 2 diabetes.

== Structure ==
Rhomboid family members share a conserved core of six transmembrane helices (TMHs), with the Ser and His residues required to form the catalytic dyad embedded in TMH-4 and TMH-6, respectively. This dyad is found deep below the membrane surface, which indicates that the hydrolysis of peptide bonds occurs within the hydrophobic phospholipid bilayer membrane. As a member of the Parl subfamily, PARL has an additional N-terminal TMH which may form a loop to the catalytic core.

== Function ==
This gene encodes a mitochondrial integral membrane protein. Following proteolytic processing of this protein, a small peptide (P-beta) is formed and translocated to the nucleus. This gene may be involved in signal transduction via regulated intramembrane proteolysis of membrane-tethered precursor proteins. Variation in this gene has been associated with increased risk for type 2 diabetes. Alternative splicing results in multiple transcript variants encoding different isoforms.

Additionally, PARL is involved in apoptosis through its interactions with the mitochondrial GTPase optic atrophy 1 (OPA1) and the Bcl-2 family-related protein HAX1. OPA1 mainly regulates mitochondrial fusion in the mitochondrial inner membrane, but after proteolytic cleavage by PARL, its short, soluble form contributes to inhibiting apoptosis by slowing down cytochrome c release, and thus, proapoptotic signaling. Alternatively, PARL can inhibit apoptosis by coordinating with HAX1 to activate HtrA2 protease, thus preventing the accumulation of the proapoptotic Bax.

== Clinical significance ==
It has been shown that the p.S77N presenilin-associated rhomboid-like protein mutation is not a frequent cause of early-onset Parkinson's disease. Variation in the sequence and/or expression of the gene encoding presenilins-associated rhomboid-like protein (PSARL) may be an important new risk factor for type 2 diabetes and other components of the metabolic syndrome. Mutations in PARL may also be involved in Leber hereditary optic neuropathy by disrupting normal function of the mitochondria, thus promoting retinal ganglion cell death and neurodegeneration.

== Interactions ==
PARL has been shown to interact with:

- PINK1,
- OPA1, and
- HAX1.
