= FUNDC1 =

Protein-coding gene in humans

Identifiers
- Aliases: FUNDC1, FUN14 domain containing 1
- External IDs: OMIM: 300871; MGI: 1919268; HomoloGene: 41738; GeneCards: FUNDC1; OMA:FUNDC1 - orthologs

Gene location (Human)
Chr.	X chromosome (human)
Band	Xp11.3	Start	44,523,639 bp
Band	Xp11.3	End	44,542,859 bp

Gene location (Mouse)
Chr.	X chromosome (mouse)
Band	X|X A1.2	Start	17,422,803 bp
Band	X|X A1.2	End	17,438,564 bp
RNA expression pattern
Bgee	Human / Mouse (ortholog); Top expressed in: myocardium of left ventricle; pons; lateral nuclear group of thalamus; palpebral conjunctiva; cardiac muscle tissue of right atrium; oocyte; hypothalamus; cingulate gyrus; anterior cingulate cortex; nucleus accumbens / Top expressed in: facial motor nucleus; anterior horn of spinal cord; vestibular membrane of cochlear duct; sciatic nerve; substantia nigra; trigeminal ganglion; central gray substance of midbrain; vestibular sensory epithelium; nucleus of stria terminalis; olfactory epithelium; More reference expression data
BioGPS	n/a
Gene ontology
Molecular function	protein binding
Cellular component	integral component of membrane; integral component of mitochondrial outer membrane; membrane; mitochondrion; mitochondrial outer membrane
Biological process	autophagy; response to hypoxia; autophagy of mitochondrion; response to organonitrogen compound; macroautophagy
Sources:Amigo / QuickGO
Orthologs
Species	Human	Mouse
Entrez	139341	72018
Ensembl	ENSG00000069509	ENSMUSG00000025040
UniProt	Q8IVP5	Q9DB70
RefSeq (mRNA)	NM_173794	NM_028058; NM_001313745; NM_001313746
RefSeq (protein)	NP_776155	NP_001300674; NP_001300675; NP_082334
Location (UCSC)	Chr X: 44.52 – 44.54 Mb	Chr X: 17.42 – 17.44 Mb
PubMed search
- Wikidata
View/Edit Human	View/Edit Mouse

FUN14 domain containing 1 is a protein that in humans is encoded by the FUNDC1 gene.
