= Mitotrope =

Mitotropes are a novel class of drugs that aim to improve cardiac performance by influencing the mitochondria. Their intended effect is similar to the calcium-based inotropes, and intend to have fewer long-term side effects.
