= HAX1 =

Protein-coding gene in humans

Identifiers
- Aliases: HAX1, HCLSBP1, HS1BP1, SCN3, HCLS1 associated protein X-1
- External IDs: OMIM: 605998; MGI: 1346319; GeneCards: HAX1

Gene location (Human)
Chr.	Chromosome 1 (human)
Band	1q21.3	Start	154,272,589 bp
Band	1q21.3	End	154,275,875 bp

Gene location (Mouse)
Chr.	Chromosome 3 (mouse)
Band	3|3 F1	Start	89,902,753 bp
Band	3|3 F1	End	89,906,087 bp
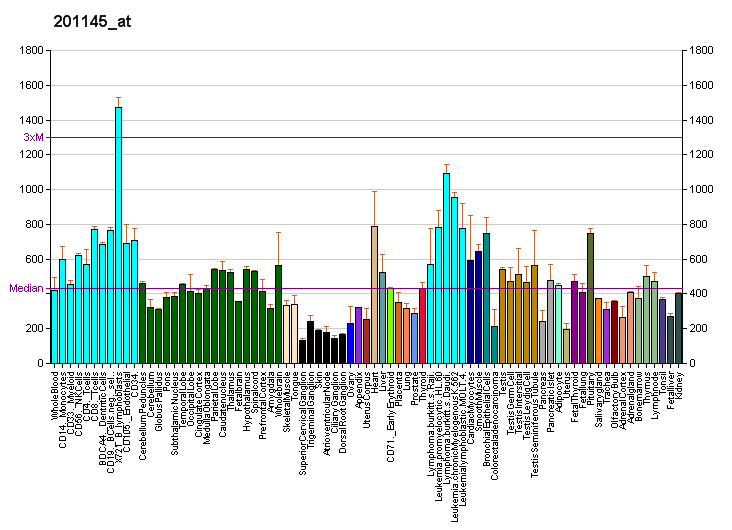
RNA expression pattern
Bgee	Human / Mouse (ortholog); Top expressed in: apex of heart; right ventricle; muscle of thigh; left ventricle; pituitary gland; body of tongue; anterior pituitary; beta cell; thoracic diaphragm; muscle of arm / Top expressed in: morula; epiblast; pancreas; islet of Langerhans; primary oocyte; proximal tubule; adrenal gland; right kidney; yolk sac; embryo; More reference expression data
BioGPS	More reference expression data
Gene ontology
Molecular function	protein N-terminus binding; protein binding; interleukin-1 binding
Cellular component	cytoplasm; nuclear membrane; nuclear envelope; membrane; transcription regulator complex; mitochondrial intermembrane space; sarcoplasmic reticulum; mitochondrial outer membrane; endoplasmic reticulum; mitochondrion; actin cytoskeleton; cytoplasmic vesicle; nucleus; lamellipodium; P-body; plasma membrane; cell cortex
Biological process	regulation of apoptotic process; positive regulation of protein kinase B signaling; mitochondrion organization; negative regulation of apoptotic process; cellular response to cytokine stimulus; positive regulation of peptidyl-serine phosphorylation; regulation of actin filament polymerization; regulation of autophagy of mitochondrion; regulation of protein targeting to mitochondrion; positive regulation of peptidyl-tyrosine phosphorylation; positive regulation of granulocyte differentiation; positive regulation of phosphatidylinositol 3-kinase signaling; positive regulation of actin cytoskeleton reorganization; positive regulation of transcription by RNA polymerase II
Sources:Amigo / QuickGO
Orthologs
Databases	NCBI: entry; OMA: entry
Species	Human	Mouse
Entrez	10456	23897
Ensembl	ENSG00000143575	ENSMUSG00000027944
UniProt	O00165; Q5VYD6	O35387
RefSeq (mRNA)	NM_006118; NM_001018837	NM_001282032; NM_011826; NM_001310681
RefSeq (protein)	NP_001018238; NP_006109	NP_001268961; NP_001297610; NP_035956
Location (UCSC)	Chr 1: 154.27 – 154.28 Mb	Chr 3: 89.9 – 89.91 Mb
PubMed search
- Wikidata
View/Edit Human	View/Edit Mouse

HCLS1-associated protein X-1 is a protein that in humans is encoded by the HAX1 gene.

The protein encoded by this gene is known to associate with HS1, a substrate of Src family tyrosine kinases. It also interacts with the product of PKD2 gene, mutations in which are associated with autosomal-dominant polycystic kidney disease, and with F-actin-binding protein, cortactin. It was earlier thought that this gene product is mainly localized in the mitochondria, however, recent studies indicate it to be localized in the cell body. Two transcript variants encoding different isoforms have been found for this gene.

In 2015, localization of the protein to P-bodies was demonstrated.

== Severe congenital neutropenia ==
Homozygous mutations in HAX1 are associated with autosomal recessive severe congenital neutropenia.

== Interactions ==
HAX1 has been shown to interact with IL1A. The protein has also been shown to interact with the 3' untranslated regions of vimentin and DNA polymerase B transcripts. The protein has been shown to interact with the mitochondrial protein disaggregase Skd3 and Skd3 has been shown to be essential for HAX1 solubility within mitochondria.
