= PINK1 =

Protein found in humans

Identifiers
- Aliases: PINK1, BRPK, PARK6, PTEN induced putative kinase 1, PTEN induced kinase 1
- External IDs: OMIM: 608309; MGI: 1916193; GeneCards: PINK1
Enzyme activity
EC #	BRENDA	ExPASy	KEGG	MetaCyc
2.7.11.1	↗	↗	↗	↗

Gene location (Human)
Chr.	Chromosome 1 (human)
Band	1p36.12	Start	20,633,458 bp
Band	1p36.12	End	20,651,511 bp

Gene location (Mouse)
Chr.	Chromosome 4 (mouse)
Band	4|4 D3	Start	138,040,720 bp
Band	4|4 D3	End	138,053,618 bp
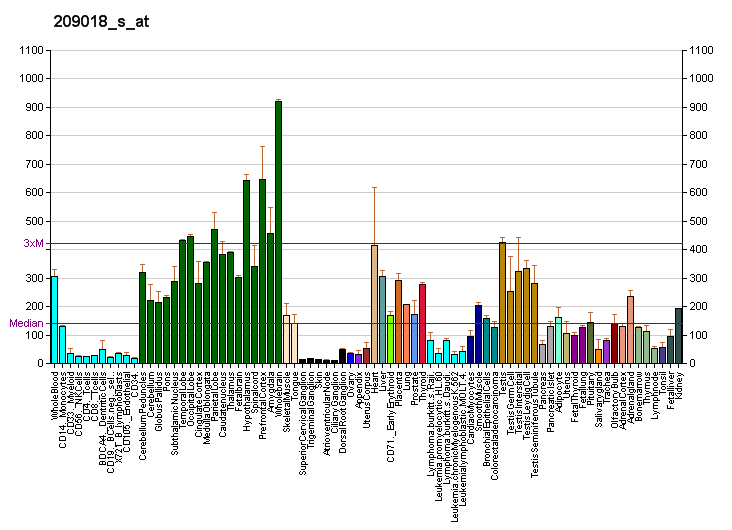

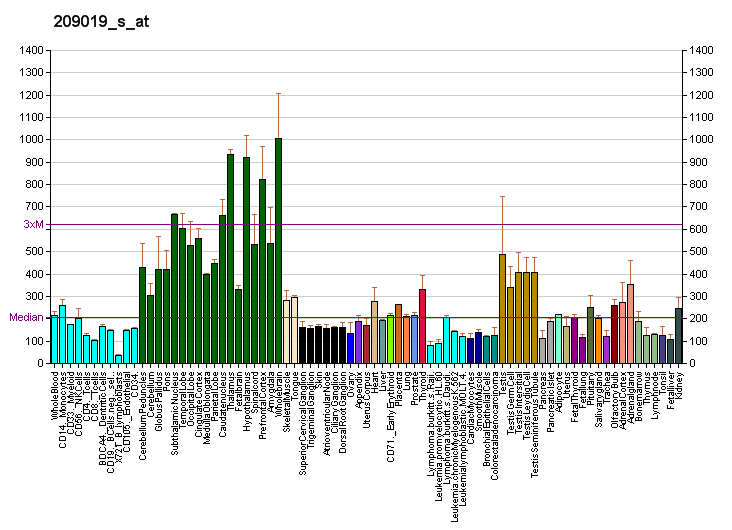
RNA expression pattern
Bgee	Human / Mouse (ortholog); Top expressed in: tendon of biceps brachii; glutes; gastrocnemius muscle; right frontal lobe; prefrontal cortex; amygdala; muscle of thigh; apex of heart; putamen; nucleus accumbens / Top expressed in: muscle of thigh; myocardium of ventricle; intercostal muscle; sciatic nerve; digastric muscle; triceps brachii muscle; ankle; sternocleidomastoid muscle; temporal muscle; extraocular muscle; More reference expression data
BioGPS	More reference expression data
Gene ontology
Molecular function	C3HC4-type RING finger domain binding; kinase activity; ATP binding; protein kinase activity; metal ion binding; protein serine/threonine kinase activity; calcium-dependent protein kinase activity; peptidase activator activity; magnesium ion binding; transferase activity; protease binding; protein binding; nucleotide binding; protein kinase B binding; ubiquitin protein ligase binding
Cellular component	cytoplasm; cytosol; membrane; mitochondrial intermembrane space; mitochondrion; perinuclear region of cytoplasm; cytoskeleton; nucleus; Lewy body; integral component of mitochondrial outer membrane; mitochondrial outer membrane; chromatin; TORC2 complex; integral component of membrane; ubiquitin ligase complex; mitochondrial outer membrane translocase complex; astrocyte projection; axon; cell body; mitochondrial inner membrane; growth cone
Biological process	negative regulation of neuron apoptotic process; positive regulation of mitophagy in response to mitochondrial depolarization; positive regulation of free ubiquitin chain polymerization; regulation of protein ubiquitination; cellular response to toxic substance; positive regulation of catecholamine secretion; regulation of synaptic vesicle transport; positive regulation of translation; protein phosphorylation; positive regulation of dopamine secretion; macroautophagy; regulation of protein-containing complex assembly; cellular response to hypoxia; negative regulation of autophagosome assembly; positive regulation of protein kinase B signaling; positive regulation of protein dephosphorylation; ubiquitin-dependent protein catabolic process; peptidyl-serine autophosphorylation; regulation of neuron apoptotic process; response to oxidative stress; negative regulation of gene expression; positive regulation of peptidyl-serine phosphorylation; negative regulation of mitochondrial fission; positive regulation of mitochondrial electron transport, NADH to ubiquinone; positive regulation of macroautophagy; regulation of autophagy of mitochondrion; positive regulation of ubiquitin-protein transferase activity; negative regulation of hydrogen peroxide-induced neuron intrinsic apoptotic signaling pathway; protein ubiquitination; negative regulation of oxidative stress-induced cell death; negative regulation of intrinsic apoptotic signaling pathway in response to hydrogen peroxide; positive regulation of synaptic transmission, dopaminergic; negative regulation of hypoxia-induced intrinsic apoptotic signaling pathway; regulation of oxidative phosphorylation; regulation of mitochondrion organization; regulation of hydrogen peroxide metabolic process; negative regulation of oxidative stress-induced neuron death; protein stabilization; mitochondrion organization; positive regulation of DNA-binding transcription factor activity; negative regulation of autophagy of mitochondrion; regulation of reactive oxygen species metabolic process; positive regulation of ATP biosynthetic process; maintenance of protein location in mitochondrion; regulation of protein targeting to mitochondrion; positive regulation of release of cytochrome c from mitochondria; respiratory electron transport chain; positive regulation of protein ubiquitination; regulation of proteasomal protein catabolic process; activation of protein kinase B activity; intracellular signal transduction; negative regulation of macroautophagy; positive regulation of protein targeting to mitochondrion; positive regulation of cristae formation; positive regulation of peptidase activity; TORC2 signaling; regulation of mitochondrial membrane potential; autophagy; negative regulation of JNK cascade; establishment of protein localization to mitochondrion; autophagy of mitochondrion; peptidyl-serine phosphorylation; positive regulation of I-kappaB kinase/NF-kappaB signaling; cellular response to oxidative stress; negative regulation of reactive oxygen species metabolic process; negative regulation of apoptotic process; positive regulation of protein phosphorylation; positive regulation of histone deacetylase activity; mitochondrion to lysosome transport; regulation of cellular response to oxidative stress; response to ischemia; positive regulation of mitochondrial fission; positive regulation of autophagy of mitochondrion in response to mitochondrial depolarization; cellular response to hydrogen sulfide; phosphorylation; negative regulation of neuron death; positive regulation of NMDA glutamate receptor activity; negative regulation of intrinsic apoptotic signaling pathway
Sources:Amigo / QuickGO
Orthologs
Databases	NCBI: entry; OMA: entry
Species	Human	Mouse
Entrez	65018	68943
Ensembl	ENSG00000158828	ENSMUSG00000028756
UniProt	Q9BXM7	Q99MQ3
RefSeq (mRNA)	NM_032409	NM_026880
RefSeq (protein)	NP_115785	NP_081156
Location (UCSC)	Chr 1: 20.63 – 20.65 Mb	Chr 4: 138.04 – 138.05 Mb
PubMed search
- Wikidata
View/Edit Human	View/Edit Mouse

PTEN-induced kinase 1 (PINK1) is a mitochondrial serine/threonine-protein kinase encoded by the PINK1 gene.

It is thought to protect cells from stress-induced mitochondrial dysfunction. PINK1 activity causes the parkin protein to bind to depolarized mitochondria to induce autophagy of those mitochondria. PINK1 is processed by healthy mitochondria and released to trigger neuron differentiation. Mutations in this gene cause one form of autosomal recessive early-onset Parkinson's disease.

== Structure ==
PINK1 is synthesized as a 63,000 Da protein which is often cleaved by PARL, between the 103-Alanine and the 104-Phenylalanine residues, into a 53,000 Da fragment. PINK1 contains an N-terminal mitochondrial localization sequence, a putative transmembrane sequence, a Ser/Thr kinase domain, and a C-terminal regulatory sequence. The protein has been found to localize to the outer membrane of mitochondria, but can also be found throughout the cytosol. Experiments suggest the Ser/Thr kinase domain faces outward toward the cytosol, indicating a possible point of interaction with parkin.

The structure of PINK1 has been solved and shows how the protein binds and phosphorylates its substrate ubiquitin.

== Function ==
PINK1 is intimately involved with mitochondrial quality control by identifying damaged mitochondria and targeting specific mitochondria for degradation (mitophagy). Healthy mitochondria maintain a membrane potential that can be used to import PINK1 into the mitochondrial inner membrane where it is cleaved by PARL and cleared from the outer membrane. Severely damaged mitochondria lack sufficient membrane potential to import PINK1, which then accumulates on the outer membrane. PINK1 then recruits Parkin to target the damaged mitochondria for degradation. Due to the presence of PINK1 throughout the cytoplasm, it has been suggested that PINK1 functions as a "scout" to probe for damaged mitochondria. In neurons, processed PINK1 released by healthy mitochondria activates signaling pathways that promote dendritic branching, spine maturation and synaptic function.

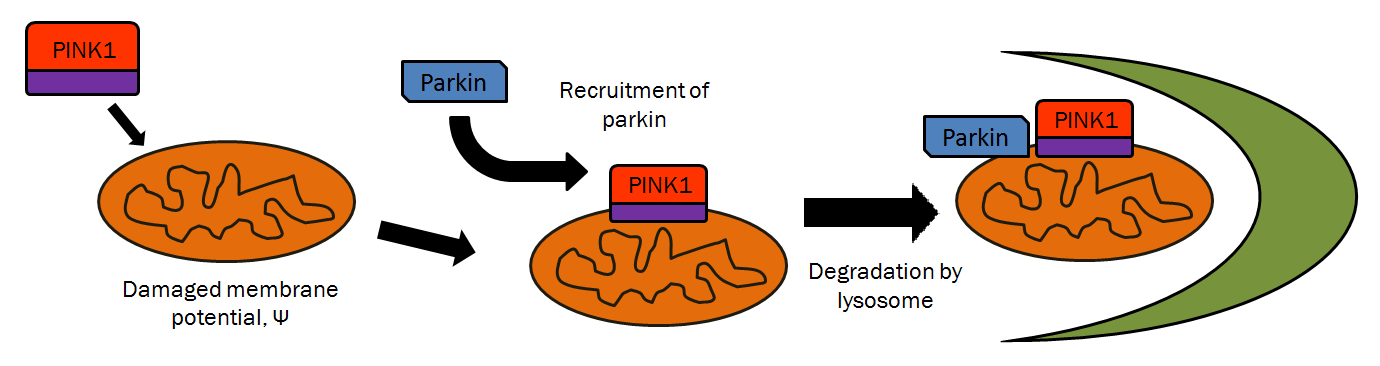
Damaged mitochondria is being recognized by PINK1. PINK1 builds up on the outer membrane of the mitochondria and recruits parkin. The PINK1/parkin pathway then designates the mitochondria for degradation by lysosomes.

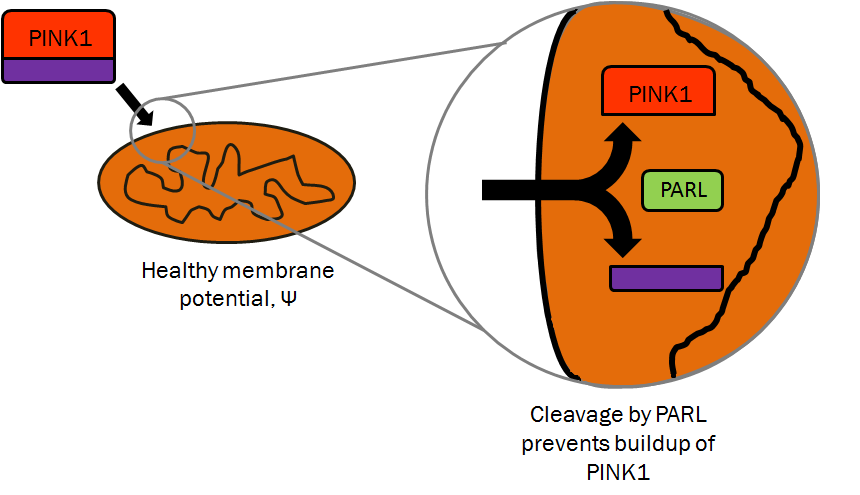
Healthy mitochondria can import PINK1 where it is subsequently cleaved by PARL. This prevents any buildup of PINK1 and parkin is not recruited to the mitochondria.

PINK1 may also control mitochondria quality through mitochondrial fission. Through mitochondrial fission, a number of daughter mitochondria are created, often with an uneven distribution in membrane potential. Mitochondria with a strong, healthy membrane potential were more likely to undergo fusion than mitochondria with low membrane potential. Interference with the mitochondrial fission pathway led to an increase in oxidized proteins and a decrease in respiration. Without PINK1, parkin cannot efficiently localize to damaged mitochondria, while an over-expression of PINK1 causes parkin to localize to even healthy mitochondria. Furthermore, mutations in both Drp1, a mitochondrial fission factor, and PINK1 were fatal in Drosophila models. However, an over-expression of Drp1 could rescue subjects deficient in PINK1 or parkin, suggesting mitochondrial fission initiated by Drp1 recreates the same effects of the PINK1/parkin pathway. Regulation of mitochondrial fission by PINK1 modulates synaptic function.

In addition to mitochondrial fission, PINK1 has been implicated in mitochondrial motility. The accumulation of PINK1 and recruitment of parkin targets a mitochondrion for degradation, and PINK1 may serve to enhance degradation rates by arresting mitochondrial motility. Over-expression of PINK1 produced similar effects to silencing Miro, a protein closely associated with mitochondrial migration.

Another mechanism of mitochondrial quality control may arise through mitochondria-derived vesicles. Oxidative stress in mitochondria can produce potentially harmful compounds including improperly folded proteins or reactive oxygen species. PINK1 has been shown to facilitate the creation of mitochondria-derived vesicles which can separate reactive oxygen species and shuttle them toward lysosomes for degradation.

== Disease relevance ==
Parkinson's disease is often characterized by the degeneration of dopaminergic neurons and associated with the build-up of improperly folded proteins and Lewy bodies. Mutations in the PINK1 protein have been shown to lead to a build-up of such improperly folded proteins in the mitochondria of both fly and human cells. Specifically, mutations in the serine/threonine kinase domain have been found in a number of Parkinson's patients where PINK1 fails to protect against stress-induced mitochondrial dysfunction and apoptosis.

== Pharmacological manipulation ==
To date, there have been few reports of small molecules that activate PINK1 and their promise as potential treatments for Parkinson's disease. The first report appeared in 2013 when Kevan Shokat and his team from UCSF identified a nucleobase called kinetin as an activator of PINK1. Subsequently, it was shown by others that the nucleoside derivative of kinetin, i.e. kinetin riboside, exhibited significant activation of PINK1 in cells. Additionally, the monophosphate prodrugs of kinetin riboside, ProTides, also showed activation of PINK1. In December 2017, niclosamide, an anthelmintic drug, was identified as a potent activator of PINK1 in cells and in neurons. Another strategy to elevate PINK1 activity involves small molecule-mediated inhibition of PINK1 degradation, which confers protection in toxin and patient-derived models.
