= PHB2 =

Protein-coding gene in the species Homo sapiens

Identifiers
- Aliases: PHB2, BAP, BCAP37, Bap37, PNAS-141, REA, p22, hBAP, prohibitin 2, Prohibitin-2
- External IDs: OMIM: 610704; MGI: 102520; GeneCards: PHB2

Gene location (Human)
Chr.	Chromosome 12 (human)
Band	12p13.31	Start	6,965,327 bp
Band	12p13.31	End	6,970,780 bp

Gene location (Mouse)
Chr.	Chromosome 6 (mouse)
Band	6 F2|6 59.17 cM	Start	124,689,299 bp
Band	6 F2|6 59.17 cM	End	124,693,913 bp
RNA expression pattern
Bgee	Human / Mouse (ortholog); Top expressed in: vulva; nipple; skin of arm; vastus lateralis muscle; triceps brachii muscle; left ovary; jejunal mucosa; skin of thigh; thymus; glutes / Top expressed in: yolk sac; embryo; embryo; ventricular zone; tail of embryo; right kidney; lip; esophagus; muscle of thigh; neural layer of retina; More reference expression data
BioGPS	n/a
Gene ontology
Molecular function	protein N-terminus binding; amide binding; protein C-terminus binding; protein binding; estrogen receptor binding; sphingolipid binding
Cellular component	cytoplasm; membrane; nuclear matrix; cell surface; mitochondrial outer membrane; mitochondrion; extracellular exosome; nucleus; cell periphery; mitochondrial inner membrane; axon; postsynaptic density; protein-containing complex; presynaptic active zone; glutamatergic synapse; GABA-ergic synapse
Biological process	regulation of transcription, DNA-templated; mammary gland branching involved in thelarche; protein stabilization; regulation of branching involved in mammary gland duct morphogenesis; mitochondrion organization; negative regulation of mammary gland epithelial cell proliferation; positive regulation of DNA-binding transcription factor activity; positive regulation of exit from mitosis; mammary gland alveolus development; negative regulation of DNA-binding transcription factor activity; transcription, DNA-templated; sister chromatid cohesion; positive regulation of cell cycle G1/S phase transition; positive regulation of ERK1 and ERK2 cascade; negative regulation of transcription, DNA-templated; negative regulation of intracellular estrogen receptor signaling pathway; regulation of complement activation; mitochondrial calcium ion transmembrane transport; response to wounding; negative regulation of apoptotic process; cellular response to retinoic acid; cellular response to hypoxia; protein import into nucleus; regulation of cytochrome-c oxidase activity
Sources:Amigo / QuickGO
Orthologs
Databases	NCBI: entry; OMA: entry
Species	Human	Mouse
Entrez	11331	12034
Ensembl	ENSG00000215021	ENSMUSG00000004264
UniProt	Q99623	O35129
RefSeq (mRNA)	NM_001144831; NM_001267700	NM_007531
RefSeq (protein)	NP_001138303; NP_001254629	NP_031557
Location (UCSC)	Chr 12: 6.97 – 6.97 Mb	Chr 6: 124.69 – 124.69 Mb
PubMed search
- Wikidata
View/Edit Human	View/Edit Mouse

Prohibitin-2 is a protein that in humans is encoded by the PHB2 gene.

== Interactions ==
PHB2 has been shown to interact with PTMA.
