= BNIP3 =

Protein-coding gene in the species Homo sapiens

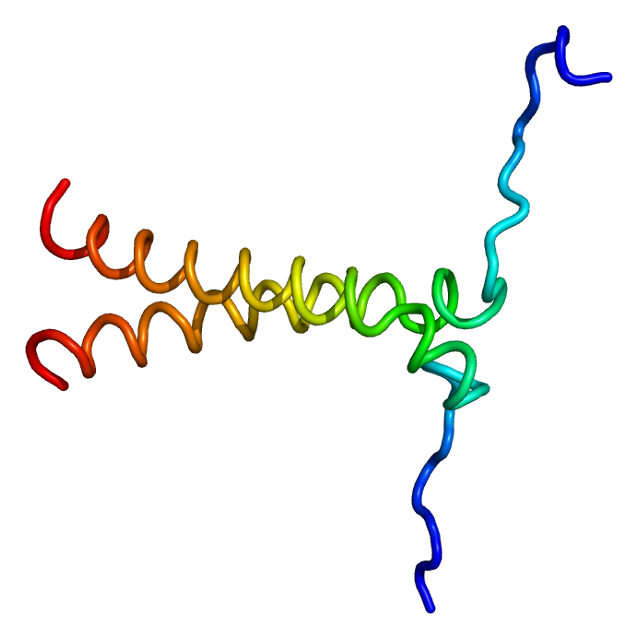

Identifiers
- Aliases: BNIP3, NIP3, BCL2/adenovirus E1B 19kDa interacting protein 3, BCL2 interacting protein 3, HABON
- External IDs: OMIM: 603293; MGI: 109326; GeneCards: BNIP3
Available structures
PDB	Ortholog search: PDBe RCSB
PDB	List of PDB id codes 2J5D, 2KA1, 2KA2

Gene location (Human)
Chr.	Chromosome 10 (human)
Band	10q26.3	Start	131,967,684 bp
Band	10q26.3	End	131,981,967 bp

Gene location (Mouse)
Chr.	Chromosome 7 (mouse)
Band	7|7 F4	Start	138,492,565 bp
Band	7|7 F4	End	138,511,248 bp
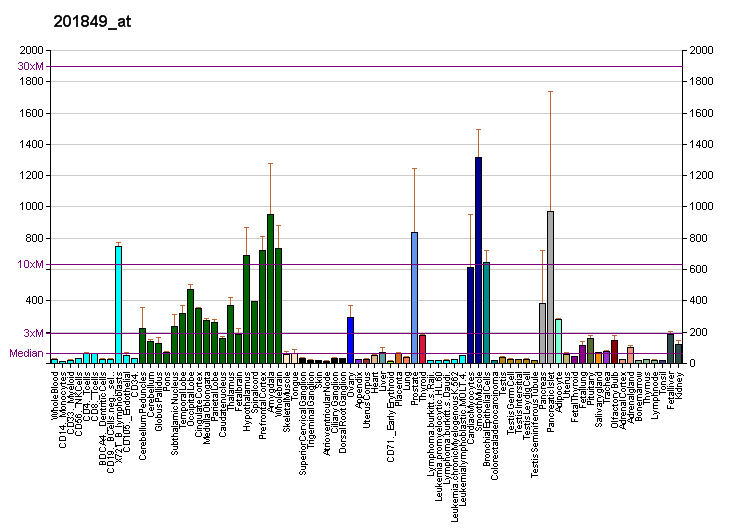

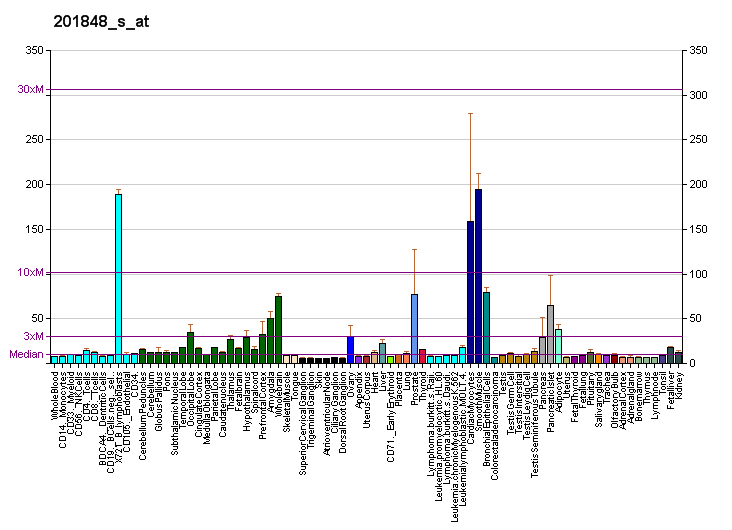
RNA expression pattern
Bgee	Human / Mouse (ortholog); Top expressed in: endothelial cell; pons; body of pancreas; pars compacta; right ventricle; pars reticulata; postcentral gyrus; entorhinal cortex; lateral nuclear group of thalamus; dorsal motor nucleus of vagus nerve / Top expressed in: morula; muscle of thigh; proximal tubule; right kidney; esophagus; soleus muscle; quadriceps femoris muscle; neural layer of retina; white adipose tissue; brown adipose tissue; More reference expression data
BioGPS	More reference expression data
Gene ontology
Molecular function	protein homodimerization activity; protein binding; identical protein binding; protein heterodimerization activity; GTPase binding
Cellular component	cytoplasm; integral component of membrane; nuclear envelope; mitochondrial membranes; membrane; integral component of mitochondrial outer membrane; nucleoplasm; mitochondrial outer membrane; dendrite; endoplasmic reticulum; mitochondrion; mitochondrial envelope; nucleus; postsynaptic density
Biological process	neuron apoptotic process; regulation of aerobic respiration; mitochondrial fragmentation involved in apoptotic process; positive regulation of mitochondrial fission; response to hypoxia; positive regulation of autophagy; regulation of mitochondrion organization; response to hyperoxia; positive regulation of cardiac muscle cell apoptotic process; cell death; negative regulation of apoptotic process; positive regulation of programmed cell death; negative regulation of cell death; toxin transport; negative regulation of membrane potential; reactive oxygen species metabolic process; intrinsic apoptotic signaling pathway; positive regulation of macroautophagy; positive regulation of protein-containing complex disassembly; cellular response to mechanical stimulus; cellular response to cobalt ion; regulation of mitochondrial membrane permeability; autophagy of mitochondrion; defense response to virus; intrinsic apoptotic signaling pathway in response to hypoxia; brown fat cell differentiation; positive regulation of apoptotic process; positive regulation of release of cytochrome c from mitochondria; negative regulation of reactive oxygen species metabolic process; viral process; negative regulation of mitochondrial fusion; granzyme-mediated apoptotic signaling pathway; mitochondrial outer membrane permeabilization; mitochondrial protein catabolic process; autophagic cell death; cellular response to hydrogen peroxide; apoptotic process; cardiac muscle cell apoptotic process; negative regulation of mitochondrial membrane potential; positive regulation of necrotic cell death; cerebral cortex development; oligodendrocyte differentiation; positive regulation of mitochondrial calcium ion concentration; cellular response to hypoxia; negative regulation of mitochondrial membrane permeability involved in apoptotic process; positive regulation of autophagy of mitochondrion; response to bacterium
Sources:Amigo / QuickGO
Orthologs
Databases	NCBI: entry; OMA: entry
Species	Human	Mouse
Entrez	664	12176
Ensembl	ENSG00000176171	ENSMUSG00000078566
UniProt	Q12983	O55003
RefSeq (mRNA)	NM_004052	NM_009760
RefSeq (protein)	NP_004043	NP_033890
Location (UCSC)	Chr 10: 131.97 – 131.98 Mb	Chr 7: 138.49 – 138.51 Mb
PubMed search
- Wikidata
View/Edit Human	View/Edit Mouse

BCL2/adenovirus E1B 19 kDa protein-interacting protein 3 is a protein found in humans that is encoded by the BNIP3 gene.

BNIP3 is a member of the apoptotic Bcl-2 protein family. It can induce cell death while also assisting with cell survival. Like many of the Bcl-2 family proteins, BNIP3 modulates the permeability state of the outer mitochondrial membrane by forming homo- and hetero-oligomers inside the membrane. Upregulation results in a decrease in mitochondrial potential, an increase in reactive oxygen species, mitochondrial swelling and fission, and an increase in mitochondrial turnover via autophagy. Sequence similarity with Bcl-2 family members was not detected. Humans and other animals (Drosophila, Caenorhabditis), as well as lower eukaryotes (Dictyostelium, Trypanosoma, Cryptosporidium, Paramecium) encode several BNIP3 paralogues including the human NIP3L, which induces apoptosis by interacting with viral and cellular anti-apoptosis proteins.

== Structure ==
The right-handed parallel helix-helix structure of the domain with a hydrogen bond-rich His-Ser node in the middle of the membrane, accessibility of the node for water, and continuous hydrophilic track across the membrane suggest that the domain can provide an ion-conducting pathway through the membrane. Incorporation of the BNIP3 transmembrane domain into an artificial lipid bilayer resulted in a pH-dependent conductivity increase. Necrosis-like cell death induced by BNIP3 may be related to this activity.

== Function ==
BNIP3 interacts with the E1B 19 kDa protein which is responsible for the protection of virally induced cell death, as well as E1B 19 kDa-like sequences of BCL2, also an apoptotic protector. This gene contains a BH3 domain and a transmembrane domain, which have been associated with pro-apoptotic function. The dimeric mitochondrial protein encoded by this gene is known to induce apoptosis, even in the presence of BCL2. Change of BNIP3 expression along other members of the Bcl-2 family measured by qPCR captures important characteristics of malignant transformation, and are defined as markers of resistance toward cell death, a key hallmark of cancer.

=== Transport reaction ===
The reaction catalyzed by BNIP3 is:

small molecules (out) ⇌ small molecules (in)

=== Autophagy ===
Autophagy is important for recycling cellular contents and prolonging cell life. Hanna et al. show that BNIP3 and LC3 interact to remove endoplasmic reticulum and mitochondria. When inactive BNIP3 is activated on the membrane of the mitochondria, they form homodimers where LC3 can bind to the LC3-interacting region (LIR) motif on BNIP3 and facilitates the formation of an autophagosome. Interestingly, when disrupting BNIP3 and LC3 interaction, researchers found that autophagy was reduced but not completely erased. This suggests that BNIP3 is not the only receptor on the mitochondria and ER to promote autophagy.

This relationship between autophagy and BNIP3 is widely supported in many studies. In ceramide- and arsenic trioxide- treated malignant glioma cells, increased BNIP3 expression led to mitochondrial depolarization and autophagy.

=== Autophagic cell death ===
Increased expression of BNIP3 has been shown to induce cell death in different ways in multiple cell lines. BNIP3 can induce classical apoptosis through cytochrome c and caspase activation in some cells, while in others, cells have undergone autophagic cell death, occurring in the absence of apaf-1, caspase-1 or caspase 3, and without cytochrome c release.

However, it still remains unclear if cell death is from excess autophagy itself or another mechanism. Cell death through excessive autophagy has only been shown experimentally and not in mammalian in vivo models. Kroemer and Levine believe that this name is a misnomer because cell death usually occurs with autophagy rather than by autophagy.

=== NK cell memory formation ===
The innate immune system is generally not known to exhibit memory traits, but emerging research has proven otherwise. In 2017, O'Sullivan et al. found that BNIP3 and BNIP3L play a necessary role in promoting NK cell memory formation. Expression of BNIP3 in NK cells is lowered upon viral infection as NK cell proliferation occurs but returns to its basal amounts by day 14 and through the contraction phase. By using BNIP3-knockout mice, they found a significant decrease in surviving NK cells suggesting they are important to maintain survival of NK memory cells. Additionally, by tracking mitochondria amounts and quality, they found that BNIP3 is necessary for clearing dysfunctional mitochondria with low membrane potential and reducing the build up of ROS to promote cell survival. BNIP3L was also tested and was found to play a nonredundant role in cell survival.

== Activities in the mitochondrial membrane ==
=== Integration ===
Various stimuli like decreased intracellular pH, increased cytosolic calcium concentrations, and other toxic stimuli can induce BNIP3 integration into the outer mitochondrial membrane (OMM). When integrated, its N-terminus remains in the cytoplasm while it stays anchored to the OMM via its C-terminal transmembrane domain (TMD). The TMD is essential for targeting BNIP3 to the mitochondria, homodimerization, and pro-apoptotic function. Its deletion results in the inability to induce autophagy. Once integrated in the OMM, BNIP3 exists as an inactive monomer until activated.

=== Activation ===
Upon activation, BNIP3 can form heterodimers with BCL2 and BCL-XL and bind to itself. Various conditions have been shown to induce activation and upregulation. Hypoxia has been shown to induce transcriptional upregulation of BNIP3 through an HIF1-dependent pathway in a p53-independent manner in HeLa cells, human skeletal muscle cells, and adult rat cardiomyocytes.

Using BNIP3 phosphomimetics in HEK 293 cells, researchers found that phosphorylation of BNIP3's C-terminus is necessary to prevent mitochondrial damage and promote cell survival by allowing a significant amount of autophagy to occur without the induction of cell death. Factors like cAMP and cGMP levels, calcium availability and growth factors like IGF and EGF can affect this kinase activity.

== Interactions ==
BNIP3 has been shown to interact with CD47, BCL2-like 1 and Bcl-2.
