= RHOT1 =

Protein-coding gene in the species Homo sapiens

Identifiers
- Aliases: RHOT1, ARHT1, MIRO-1, MIRO1, ras homolog family member T1
- External IDs: OMIM: 613888; MGI: 1926078; GeneCards: RHOT1

Gene location (Human)
Chr.	Chromosome 17 (human)
Band	17q11.2	Start	32,142,454 bp
Band	17q11.2	End	32,253,374 bp

Gene location (Mouse)
Chr.	Chromosome 11 (mouse)
Band	11 B5|11 47.62 cM	Start	80,099,845 bp
Band	11 B5|11 47.62 cM	End	80,158,733 bp
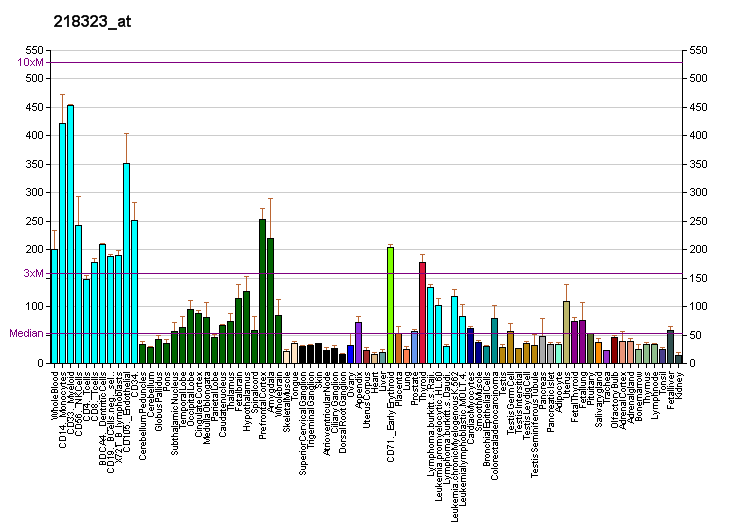

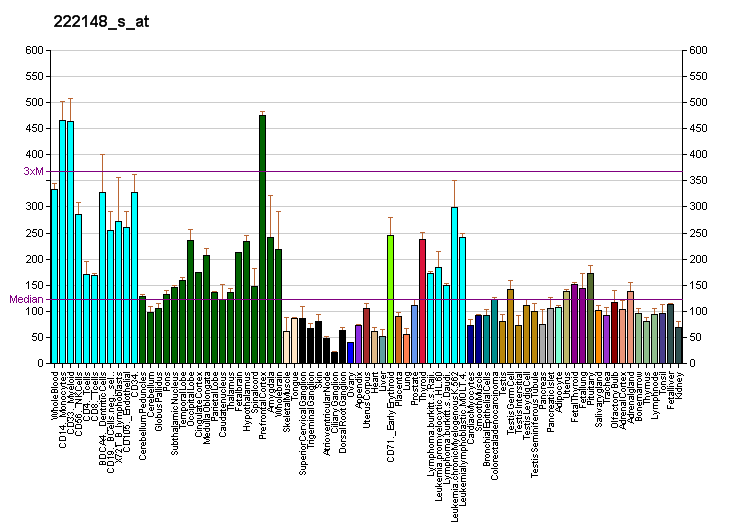
RNA expression pattern
Bgee	Human / Mouse (ortholog); Top expressed in: endothelial cell; Brodmann area 23; secondary oocyte; visceral pleura; primary visual cortex; palpebral conjunctiva; skin of thigh; gingival epithelium; parietal pleura; sperm / Top expressed in: neural layer of retina; secondary oocyte; primary oocyte; spermatocyte; spermatid; right ventricle; zygote; seminiferous tubule; temporal muscle; sternocleidomastoid muscle; More reference expression data
BioGPS	More reference expression data
Gene ontology
Molecular function	GTPase activity; protein binding; calcium ion binding; hydrolase activity; metal ion binding; nucleotide binding; GTP binding; molecular function
Cellular component	integral component of membrane; cytosol; membrane; plasma membrane; mitochondrion; integral component of mitochondrial outer membrane; mitochondrial outer membrane
Biological process	cellular homeostasis; regulation of small GTPase mediated signal transduction; mitochondrial outer membrane permeabilization; mitochondrion organization; protein deubiquitination; establishment of mitochondrion localization by microtubule attachment; regulation of neurotransmitter secretion; regulation of organelle transport along microtubule; mitochondrion transport along microtubule; Rho protein signal transduction; regulation of mitochondrion organization
Sources:Amigo / QuickGO
Orthologs
Databases	NCBI: entry; OMA: entry
Species	Human	Mouse
Entrez	55288	59040
Ensembl	ENSG00000126858	ENSMUSG00000017686
UniProt	Q8IXI2	Q8BG51
RefSeq (mRNA)	NM_001033566; NM_001033567; NM_001033568; NM_001288754; NM_001288755 NM_001288758; NM_018307	NM_001163354; NM_001163355; NM_021536; NM_001362868; NM_001362869 NM_001362870
RefSeq (protein)	NP_001028738; NP_001028739; NP_001028740; NP_001275683; NP_001275684 NP_001275687; NP_060777	NP_001156826; NP_001156827; NP_067511; NP_001349797; NP_001349798 NP_001349799; NP_001391057; NP_001391058
Location (UCSC)	Chr 17: 32.14 – 32.25 Mb	Chr 11: 80.1 – 80.16 Mb
PubMed search
- Wikidata
View/Edit Human	View/Edit Mouse

Mitochondrial Rho GTPase 1 (MIRO1) is an enzyme that in humans is encoded by the RHOT1 gene on chromosome 17. As a Miro protein isoform, the protein facilitates mitochondrial transport by attaching the mitochondria to the motor/adaptor complex. Through its key role in mitochondrial transport, RHOT1 is involved in mitochondrial homeostasis and apoptosis, as well as Parkinson's disease (PD) and cancer.

== Structure ==
In mammals, RHOT1 is one of two Miro isoforms. Both isoforms share a structure consisting of two EF-hand motifs linking two GTP-binding domains and a C-terminal transmembrane domain that attaches the protein to the outer mitochondrial membrane (OMM). The EF-hand motifs serve as binding sites for the adaptor protein Milton and the kinesin heavy chain. These domains can also bind calcium ions, and the binding results in a conformational change that dissociates the mitochondrial surface from kinesin.

== Function ==
RHOT1 is a member of the Rho GTPase family and one of two isoforms of the protein Miro: RHOT1 (Miro1) and RHOT2 (Miro2). Compared to the rest of the Rho GTPase family, the Miro isoforms are considered atypical due to their different regulation. Moreover, the Miro isoforms are only expressed in the mitochondria.

Miro associates with Milton (TRAK1/2) and the motor proteins kinesin and dynein to form the mitochondrial motor/adaptor complex. Miro functions to tether the complex to the mitochondrion while the complex transports the mitochondrion via microtubules within cells. Though Miro has been predominantly studied in neurons, the protein has also been observed to participate in the transport of mitochondria in lymphocytes toward inflamed endothelia.

The motor/adaptor complex is regulated by calcium ion levels. At high concentrations, calcium ions arrest mitochondrial transport by binding Miro, causing the complex to detach from the organelle. Considering that physiological factors such as activation of glutamate receptors in dendrites, action potentials in axons, and neuromodulators may elevate calcium ion levels, this regulatory mechanism likely serves to keep mitochondria in such areas to provide calcium ion buffering and active export and, thus, maintain homeostasis.

In addition, Miro regulates mitochondrial fusion and mitophagy in conjunction with mitofusin. According to one model, damaged mitochondria are sequestered from healthy mitochondria by the degradation of Miro and mitofusin. Miro degradation halts their movement while mitofusin degradation prevents them from fusing with healthy mitochondria, thus facilitating their clearance by autophagosomes.

Though the exact mechanisms remain to be elucidated, RHOT1 has been implicated in promoting caspase-dependent apoptosis.

== Clinical significance ==
Studies indicate that Miro may be involved in PD. In neurons, Miro interacts with two key proteins involved in PD, PINK1 and Parkin. Following depolarization of the mitochondria, PINK1 phosphorylates Miro at multiple sites, including S156, and Parkin ubiquitinates Miro, targeting it for proteasomal degradation. Degradation of Miro then halts mitochondrial transport.

Though the Rho GTPase family is closely associated with cancer progression, there are few studies demonstrating such association with the atypical Miro proteins. Nonetheless, RHOT1 has been implicated in pancreatic cancer as a tumor suppressor through its regulation of mitochondrial homeostasis and apoptosis. Thus, this protein could serve as a therapeutic target for cancer treatment.

== Interactions ==
RHOT1 has been shown to interact with:

- ALEX3,
- DISC1,
- Dynein,
- HUMMR,
- kinesin heavy chain (KHC),
- Mitofusin (MFN1/MFN2),
- Milton (TRAK1/TRAK2),
- Parkin,
- PINK1, and
- OGT.
