= ARMCX5 =

Protein in Homo sapiens

Identifiers
- Aliases: ARMCX5, GASP5, armadillo repeat containing, X-linked 5, armadillo repeat containing X-linked 5
- External IDs: MGI: 2148026; GeneCards: ARMCX5

Gene location (Human)
Chr.	X chromosome (human)
Band	Xq22.1	Start	102,599,168 bp
Band	Xq22.1	End	102,604,159 bp

Gene location (Mouse)
Chr.	X chromosome (mouse)
Band	X|X F1	Start	134,643,482 bp
Band	X|X F1	End	134,648,071 bp
RNA expression pattern
Bgee	Human / Mouse (ortholog); Top expressed in: islet of Langerhans; gonad; testicle; hair follicle; epithelium of nasopharynx; corpus epididymis; body of pancreas; rectum; cartilage tissue; mucosa of paranasal sinus / Top expressed in: zygote; secondary oocyte; primary oocyte; ovary; hippocampus proper; granulocyte; superior frontal gyrus; hypothalamus; primary visual cortex; dentate gyrus of hippocampal formation granule cell; More reference expression data
BioGPS	n/a
Orthologs
Databases	NCBI: entry; OMA: entry
Species	Human	Mouse
Entrez	64860	494468
Ensembl	ENSG00000125962	ENSMUSG00000072969
UniProt	Q6P1M9	Q3UZB0
RefSeq (mRNA)	NM_022838; NM_001168478; NM_001168479; NM_001168480; NM_001168482 NM_001168485	NM_001009575
RefSeq (protein)	NP_001161950; NP_001161951; NP_001161952; NP_001161954; NP_001161957 NP_073749	NP_001009575
Location (UCSC)	Chr X: 102.6 – 102.6 Mb	Chr X: 134.64 – 134.65 Mb
PubMed search
- Wikidata
View/Edit Human	View/Edit Mouse

ARMCX5 is an armadillo repeat–containing protein that is encoded by the X-linked ARMCX5 gene. It is conserved only in Eutheria, a specific group of placental mammals, but no further back in evolutionary time. ARMCX5 contains 3 ARM-like repeats, DUF364, and ARM-type fold.

== Features ==
Accession Number	NC_0002.10
Aliases	FLJ12969, FLJ13382, and RP4-769N13.3
Chromosomal location	Xq22.1-q22.3
Gene size	4991 base pairs
mRNA size	2924 base pairs
Protein size	588 amino acids

== Splice Variants ==
ARMCX5 has 6 splice variants.

Splice isoform/transcript variant	mRNA sequence length	Accession number
1	2924	NM_001168479.1
2	2695	NM_022838.3
3	2808	NM_001168478.1
4	2918	NM_001168480.1
5	2805	NM_001168485.1
6	2707	NM_001168482.1

== ORTHOLOGS ==
ARMCX5 has ten orthologs.

Ortholog genus name	Common name	Accession number	Sequence length	Sequence identity	Sequence similarity
Pongo abelli	Orangatuan	XP_002831961.1	547	97.1%	99%
Macaca mulata	Rhesus monkey	EHH30927.1	558	95.3%	97%
Macaca fascicularis	Crab eating macaque	EHH61076.1	558	95%	97%
Callithrix Jacchus	Common marmoset	XP_002763850.1	568	89.4%	93%
Equus caballus	Horse	NC009175.2	609	80%	85%
Canis lupus familiaris	dog	XP_538116.2	608	79%	85%
Sus scrofa	Common pig	XP_003135327.2	732	78%	85%
Oryctolagus cuniculus	Common rabbit	XP_00272091.1	547	76.8%	85%
Rattus norvegicus	Common rat	XP_001499348.2	567	61.1%	76%
Mus musculus	Mouse	NP_001009575.2	606	57%	71%

== Paralogs ==
ARMCX5 has 8 paralogs listed by genecards: GPRASP2, ARMCX1, BHLHB9, ARMCX2, GPRASP1, ARMCX6, ARMCX10, and ARMCX3.

== Function ==
Proteins containing this ARMCX5 domain interact with numerous other proteins. Through these interactions, they are involved in a wide variety of processes including carcinogenesis, control of cellular ageing and survival, regulation f circadian rhythm and lysosomal sorting of G-protein coupled receptors.

Because DUF364 contains a PLP-dependent transferase-like fold, the genomic context suggests that it may have a role in anaerobic vitamin B12 biosynthesis.

== Expression ==
ARMCX5 is a highly ubiquitously expressed gene that has shown expression in many tissues.

Body Site	Transcripts per million	Gene EST/Total EST in pool
Brain	25	28/1092524
Bone marrow	82	4/48711
Mouth	60	4/66139
Vascular	58	3/51637
Spleen	56	3/53365
Mammary gland	52	8/151228
Esophagus	49	1/20152
Larynx	42	1/23489
Trachea	38	2/51769
Muscle	37	4/106323
Testes	33	11/327305
