= RHOT2 =

Protein-coding gene in the species Homo sapiens

Identifiers
- Aliases: RHOT2, ARHT2, C16orf39, MIRO-2, MIRO2, RASL, ras homolog family member T2
- External IDs: OMIM: 613889; MGI: 2384892; GeneCards: RHOT2
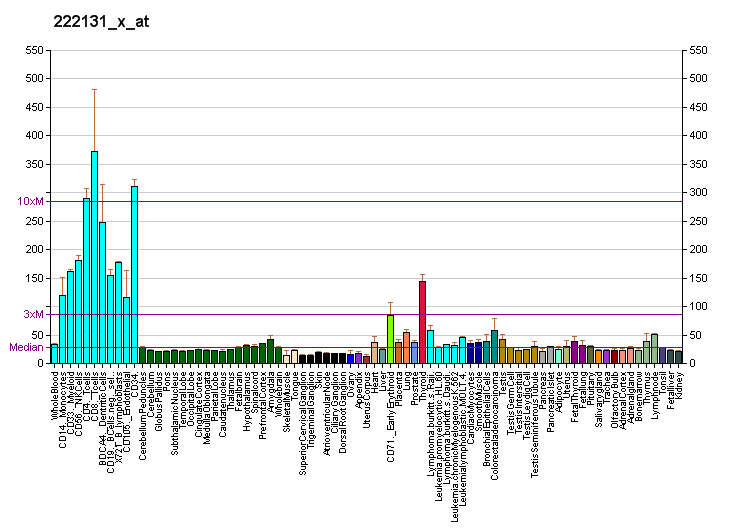

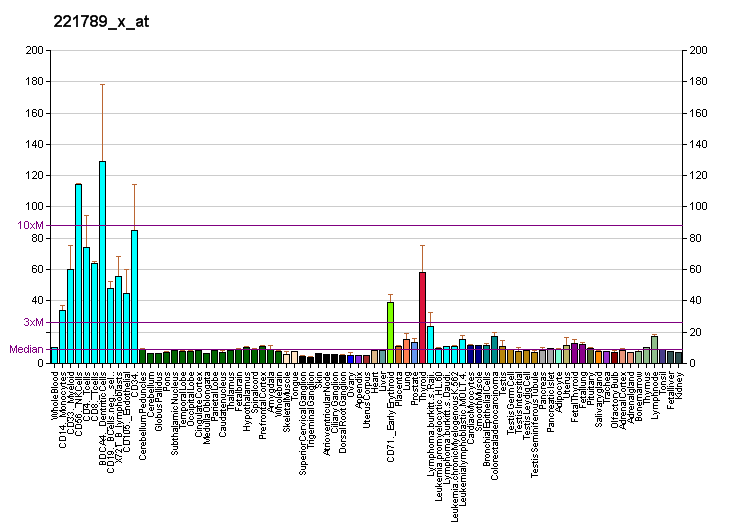

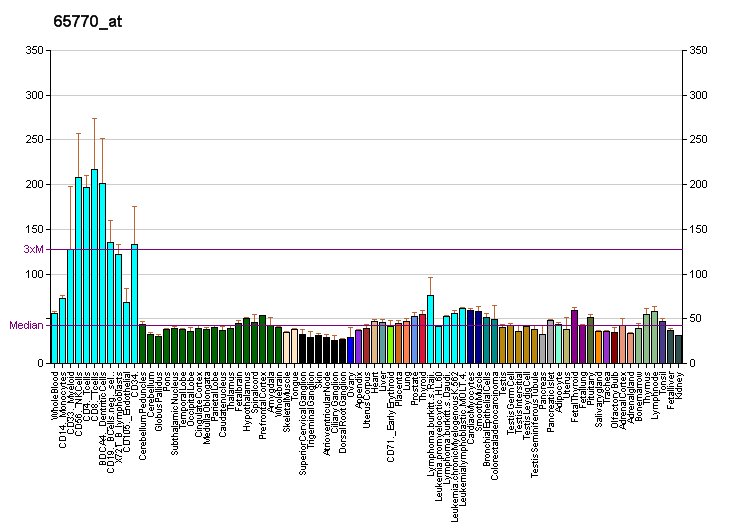
RNA expression pattern
Bgee	Human / Mouse (ortholog); n/a / n/a
BioGPS	More reference expression data
Gene ontology
Molecular function	nucleotide binding; calcium ion binding; GTP binding; metal ion binding; protein binding; GTPase activity; hydrolase activity
Cellular component	integral component of membrane; cytosol; membrane; plasma membrane; integral component of mitochondrial outer membrane; mitochondrial outer membrane; mitochondrion; extracellular exosome
Biological process	mitochondrion organization; cellular homeostasis; mitochondrion transport along microtubule; regulation of small GTPase mediated signal transduction; mitochondrial outer membrane permeabilization; Rho protein signal transduction; regulation of mitochondrion organization
Sources:Amigo / QuickGO
Orthologs
Databases	NCBI: entry; OMA: entry
Species	Human	Mouse
Entrez	89941	214952
Ensembl	ENSG00000140983	n/a
UniProt	Q8IXI1	Q8JZN7
RefSeq (mRNA)	NM_138769	NM_145999; NM_001364950
RefSeq (protein)	NP_620124; NP_001339204; NP_001339205; NP_001339206; NP_001339207 NP_001339209; NP_001339210; NP_001339211; NP_001339212; NP_001339213; NP_001339214; NP_001339215; NP_001339216; NP_001339217; NP_001339218; NP_001339219; NP_001339220; NP_001339221; NP_001339222; NP_001339223; NP_001339208	NP_666111; NP_001351879
Location (UCSC)	n/a	n/a
PubMed search
- Wikidata
View/Edit Human	View/Edit Mouse

Mitochondrial Rho GTPase 2 is an enzyme that in humans is encoded by the RHOT2 gene. As a Miro protein isoform, the protein facilitates mitochondrial transport by attaching the mitochondria to the motor/adaptor complex. Through its key role in mitochondrial transport, RHOT2 is involved in mitochondrial homeostasis and apoptosis, as well as Parkinson's disease (PD).

== Structure ==
In mammals, RHOT2 is one of two Miro isoforms. Both isoforms share a structure consisting of two EF-hand motifs linking two GTP-binding domains and a C-terminal transmembrane domain that attaches the protein to the outer mitochondrial membrane (OMM). The EF-hand motifs serve as binding sites for the adaptor protein Milton and the kinesin heavy chain. These domains can also bind calcium ions, and the binding results in a conformational change that dissociates the mitochondrial surface from kinesin.

== Function ==
RHOT2 is a member of the Rho GTPase family and one of two isoforms of the protein Miro: RHOT1 (Miro1) and RHOT2 (Miro2). Compared to the rest of the Rho GTPase family, the Miro isoforms are considered atypical due to their different regulation. Moreover, the Miro isoforms are only expressed in the mitochondria.

Miro associates with Milton (TRAK1/2) and the motor proteins kinesin and dynein to form the mitochondrial motor/adaptor complex. Miro functions to tether the complex to the mitochondrion while the complex transports the mitochondrion via microtubules within cells. Though Miro has been predominantly studied in neurons, the protein has also been observed to participate in the transport of mitochondria in lymphocytes toward inflamed endothelia.

The motor/adaptor complex is regulated by calcium ion levels. At high concentrations, calcium ions arrest mitochondrial transport by binding Miro, causing the complex to detach from the organelle. Considering that physiological factors such as activation of glutamate receptors in dendrites, action potentials in axons, and neuromodulators may elevate calcium ion levels, this regulatory mechanism likely serves to keep mitochondria in such areas to provide calcium ion buffering and active export and, thus, maintain homeostasis.

In addition, Miro regulates mitochondrial fusion and mitophagy in conjunction with mitofusin. According to one model, damaged mitochondria are sequestered from healthy mitochondria by the degradation of Miro and mitofusin. Miro degradation halts their movement while mitofusin degradation prevents them from fusing with healthy mitochondria, thus facilitating their clearance by autophagosomes.

== Clinical significance ==
Studies indicate that Miro may be involved in PD. In neurons, Miro interacts with two key proteins involved in PD, PINK1 and Parkin. Following depolarization of the mitochondria, PINK1 phosphorylates Miro at multiple sites, including S156, and Parkin ubiquitinates Miro, targeting it for proteasomal degradation. Degradation of Miro then halts mitochondrial transport.

Though the Rho GTPase family is closely associated with cancer progression, there are few studies demonstrating such association with the atypical Miro proteins.

== Interactions ==
RHOT1 has been shown to interact with:

- ALEX3,
- DISC1,
- Dynein,
- HUMMR,
- kinesin heavy chain (KHC),
- Mitofusin (MFN1/MFN2),
- Milton (TRAK1/TRAK2),
- Parkin,
- PINK1, and
- OGT.
