= ARMCX6 =

Protein-coding gene in humans

Identifiers
- Aliases: ARMCX6, GASP10, armadillo repeat containing, X-linked 6, armadillo repeat containing X-linked 6
- External IDs: MGI: 2147993; HomoloGene: 10373; GeneCards: ARMCX6; OMA:ARMCX6 - orthologs

Gene location (Human)
Chr.	X chromosome (human)
Band	Xq22.1	Start	101,615,118 bp
Band	Xq22.1	End	101,618,001 bp

Gene location (Mouse)
Chr.	X chromosome (mouse)
Band	X|X E3	Start	133,649,210 bp
Band	X|X E3	End	133,652,166 bp
RNA expression pattern
Bgee	Human / Mouse (ortholog); Top expressed in: right adrenal cortex; body of pancreas; left adrenal cortex; smooth muscle tissue; islet of Langerhans; stromal cell of endometrium; spleen; monocyte; right coronary artery; lymph node / Top expressed in: ovary; lens; neural tube; mesencephalon; epiblast; genital tubercle; hypothalamus; rhombencephalon; neural layer of retina; embryo; More reference expression data
BioGPS	n/a
Orthologs
Species	Human	Mouse
Entrez	54470	278097
Ensembl	ENSG00000198960	ENSMUSG00000050394
UniProt	Q7L4S7	Q8K3A6
RefSeq (mRNA)	NM_001009584; NM_001184768; NM_019007	NM_001007578
RefSeq (protein)	NP_001009584; NP_001171697; NP_061880	NP_001007579
Location (UCSC)	Chr X: 101.62 – 101.62 Mb	Chr X: 133.65 – 133.65 Mb
PubMed search
- Wikidata
View/Edit Human	View/Edit Mouse

Armadillo repeat containing X-linked 6 is a protein that in humans is encoded by the ARMCX6 gene located on the X-chromosome.

It is one of six armadillo repeats containing X-linked proteins (ARMCX1, ARMCX2, ARMCX3, ARMCX4, ARMCX5, and ARMCX6 (this protein)).

The function of this protein is unknown at this time.

== Protein sequence ==
     1 MGRAREVGWM AAGLMIGAGA CYCVYKLTIG RDDSEKLEEE 
    41 GEEEWDDDQE LDEEEPDIWF DFETMARPWT EDGDWTEPGA 
    81 PGGTEDRPSG GGKANRAHPI KQRPFPYEHK NTWSAQNCKN 
   121 GSCVLDLSKC LFIQGKLLFA EPKDAGFPFS QDINSHLASL 
   161 SMARNTSPTP DPTVREALCA PDNLNASIES QGQIKMYINE 
   201 VCRETVSRCC NSFLQQAGLN LLISMTVINN MLAKSASDLK 
   241 FPLISEGSGC AKVQVLKPLM GLSEKPVLAG ELVGAQMLFS 
   301 FMSLFIRNGN REILLETPAP

== Homology ==
ARMCX6 is conserved in many eukaryotic organisms.

== Orthologs ==
taxonomic name	common name	NCBI entry	Percentage of sequence similarity	Length (AAs)	comments
Homo sapiens	Human		100%	300	armadillo repeat containing X-linked 6
Macaca mulatta	Rhesus monkey		97.0%	300	PREDICTED: similar to amrmadillo repeat containing, X-linked 6 (H. sapiens)-like isoform 1
Equus caballus	Horse		90.0%	300	PREDICTED: similar to armadillo repeat containing, X-linked 6
Danio rerio	zebrafish		84.0%	301	Similar to RIKEN cDNA 0610039K22
Mus musculus	House Mouse		97.7%	393	armadillo repeat containing, X-linked 6 (H. sapiens)-like
Bos taurus	cow		83.0%	301	armadillo repeat containing, X-linked 6
Mus musculus	Mouse		82.0%	301	armadillo repeat containing, X-linked 6
Takifugu rubripes	Tetradontoidea		66.0%	818	aryl hydrocarbon receptor 2C
Caenorhabditis elegans	C. elegans		50.0%	332	Serpentine Receptor, class H family member (srh-216)
Saccharomyces cerevisiae	Yeast		70.0%	910	Hul5p
Gallus gallus	Chicken		52.0%	317	PREDICTED: hypothetical protein

=== Secondary Structure ===
The secondary structure of ARMCX6 is predicted to be similar to cyanase. A comparison of the two sequences is shown below.

                          10        20        30        40
                ....*....|....*....|....*....|....*....|....*..
ARMCX6      231 MLAKSASDLKFPLISEGSGCAKVQVLKPLMGLSEKPVLAGELVGAQM 277
1DW9_A       19 LLSKAKKDLSFAEIADGTGLAEAFVTAALLGQQALPADAARLVGAKL 65
                 + +   ++ +  +  + + +   +   + +    +  +  ++++

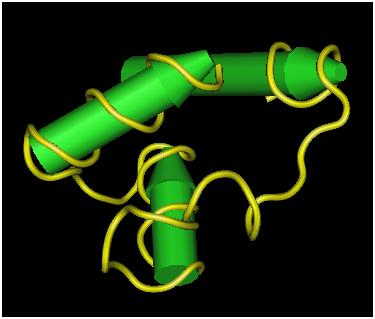
Cyanase segment having identity with ARMCX6.

== Expression ==
Microarray data show that ARMCX6 is highly expressed during earliest stages of spermatogenesis in mice.
