= TEDC1 =

Protein-coding gene in the species Homo sapiens

Identifiers
- Aliases: TEDC1, C14orf80, chromosome 14 open reading frame 80, tubulin epsilon and delta complex 1
- External IDs: MGI: 2144738; GeneCards: TEDC1

Gene location (Human)
Chr.	Chromosome 14 (human)
Band	14q32.33	Start	105,489,855 bp
Band	14q32.33	End	105,499,575 bp

Gene location (Mouse)
Chr.	Chromosome 12 (mouse)
Band	12|12 F1	Start	113,120,041 bp
Band	12|12 F1	End	113,129,668 bp
RNA expression pattern
Bgee	Human / Mouse (ortholog); Top expressed in: tendon of biceps brachii; granulocyte; mucosa of transverse colon; cingulate gyrus; anterior cingulate cortex; putamen; gonad; Brodmann area 9; sural nerve; right frontal lobe / Top expressed in: spermatocyte; yolk sac; Paneth cell; spermatid; primitive streak; ventricular zone; thymus; embryo; fossa; condyle; More reference expression data
BioGPS	n/a
Orthologs
Databases	NCBI: entry; OMA: entry
Species	Human	Mouse
Entrez	283643	104732
Ensembl	ENSG00000185347	ENSMUSG00000037466
UniProt	Q86SX3	Q3UK37
RefSeq (mRNA)	NM_173608; NM_001134875; NM_001134876; NM_001134877; NM_001198983 NM_001367178	NM_134041
RefSeq (protein)	NP_001128347; NP_001128348; NP_001128349; NP_001185912; NP_001354107	NP_598802
Location (UCSC)	Chr 14: 105.49 – 105.5 Mb	Chr 12: 113.12 – 113.13 Mb
PubMed search
- Wikidata
View/Edit Human	View/Edit Mouse

Tubulin epsilon and delta complex protein 1 is a protein which in humans is encoded by the gene TEDC1 (previously C14orf80). It is thought to function by enhancing hedgehog signaling in the cilia, and may also play a role in stabilizing actin filaments against perturbations.

== Gene ==
=== Location ===
C14orf80 is located on chromosome 14 (14q32.33) starting at 105,489,855bp and ending at 105,499,248bp. C14orf80 is 9,393 base pairs long and contains 11 exons that can be alternatively spliced to form different mRNA variants.

=== Variants ===
Transcription of C14orf80 can produce 19 mRNA splice variants. Only six of these nineteen variants are predicted to not encode for a protein. Of the mRNA variants that have been found experimentally, the longest is 1,719 base pairs and produces a protein with 426 amino acids.

=== Expression ===
C14orf80 has been determined to be expressed in 77 types of tissues and 100 developmental stages. It has also been determined to have a higher level of expression in a few cases of pancreatic and prostate cancer cells compared to normal tissue.

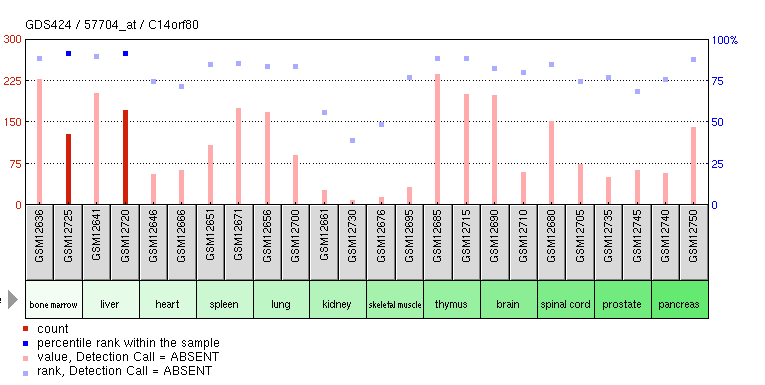
Expression of C14orf80 in a variety of tissues

== Homology ==
=== Paralogs ===
There are no paralogs of C14orf80.

=== Orthologs ===
Using the BLAST program from NCBI, the orthologs of C14orf80 were found to range from primates to invertebrates. Below is a table that contains a variety of these orthologs.

Species	Common name	Accession number	Date of divergence	Sequence length (AA)	Sequence similarity
Homo sapiens	Human	NP_001128347	0 mya	426	100%
Chlorocebus sabaeus	Green monkey	XP_007986247	29 mya	424	94%
Ictidomys tridecemlineatus	13-lined ground squirrel	XP_005334680	92.3 mya	426	80%
Bos taurus	Cow	XP_003585026	94.2 mya	419	78%
Rattus norvegicus	Brown rat	XP_002726827	92.3 mya	420	76%
Zonotrichia albicollis	White-throated sparrow	XP_005493655	296 mya	454	53%
Pelodiscus sinensis	Chinese softshell turtle	XP_006137260	296 mya	404	51%
Xenopus tropicalis	Tropical clawed frog	XP_002935771	371.2 mya	437	50%
Danio rerio	Zebra fish	XP_706561	400.1 mya	452	41%
Camponotus floridanus	Florida carpenter ant	XP_011255960	782.7 mya	374	38%

=== Evolution rate ===
When compared to the slow-evolving cytochrome C gene and the fast-evolving fibrinogen gene, gene C14orf80 is also fast-evolving.

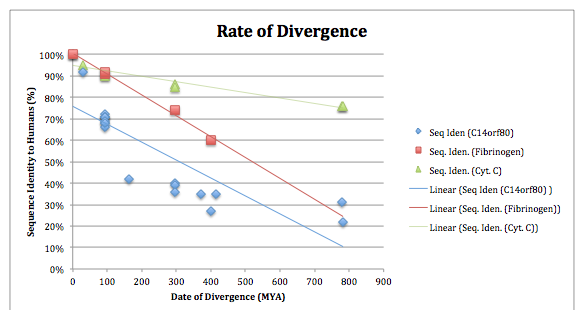
Shows how fast three different genes evolved over many millions of years.

== Protein ==
=== General properties ===
Uncharacterized protein C14orf80 is 426 amino acids long with a molecular weight of 47 kDa. Its isoelectric point is 8.9.

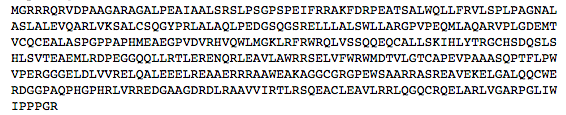
C14orf80 amino acid sequence

=== Composition ===
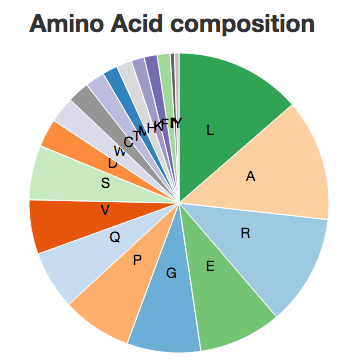
The amino acid composition of the uncharacterized protein C14orf80.

=== Secondary structure ===
Uncharacterized protein C14orf80 is predicted to be entirely composed of alpha helices. Using the program SOUSI-signal, it was predicted that uncharacterized protein C14orf80 does not contain a signal peptide and is a soluble protein.

=== Function ===
==== Domains ====
Uncharacterized protein C14orf80 has two functional domains. The first domain is the domain of unknown function 4509 and the second is the domain of unknown function 4510. As their naming states the functions of these domains are still unknown.

DUF4509 is located at amino acid 45 to amino acid 228. In this domain of unknown function there is a conserved WLL sequence motif.

DUF4510 is located at amino acid 263 to amino acid 425. In this domain of unknown function there are two conserved sequence motifs: LEA and WMD.

=== Post-translational modification ===
Uncharacterized protein C14orf80 is predicted to have glycation and phosphorylation sites for post-translational modification. Of these sites three are for glycation, eight are for serine phosphorylation and one site is for threonine phosphorylation.

=== Subcellular location ===
Uncharacterized protein C14orf80 is not predicted to be a transmembrane protein. It is mainly localized to the golgi apparatus but has been found in the nucleus and cytoplasm also.

=== Interactions ===
Currently, there are 21 proteins that are predicted to interact with uncharacterized protein C14orf80. These 21 proteins were found using the databases Mentha, BioGRID, STRING, GeneCards and IntAct. Below is a table of a variety of these 21 proteins.

Interacting protein	Full protein name	Function	Citation
DDIT3	DNA-damage inducible transcript 3	Induces cell cycle arrest and apoptosis when ER stress	
CEBPZ	CCAAT enhancer binding protein	Stimulates transcription from HSP70 promoter	
UBC	Ubiquitin C	Udeshi ND, Mani DR, Eisenhaure T, Mertins P, Jaffe JD, Clauser KR, et al. (May 2012). "Methods for quantification of in vivo changes in protein ubiquitination following proteasome and deubiquitinase inhibition". Molecular & Cellular Proteomics. 11 (5): 148–159. doi:10.1074/mcp.M111.016857. PMC 3418844. PMID 22505724.	
FKBP5	FK506 binding protein	Immunophilin protein with PPIase	Taipale M, Tucker G, Peng J, Krykbaeva I, Lin ZY, Larsen B, et al. (July 2014). "A quantitative chaperone interaction network reveals the architecture of cellular protein homeostasis pathways". Cell. 158 (2): 434–448. doi:10.1016/j.cell.2014.05.039. PMC 4104544. PMID 25036637.
DEF107A	Beta-defensin 107	Anti-bacterial activity	
XAGE1D	Cancer/testis antigen family 12 member 1D		
TRAK2	Trafficking protein kinesin binding 2	May regulate endosome to lysosome trafficking of membrane cargo	
NRF1	Nuclear respiratory factor 1	Transcription factor on nuclear genes encoding respiratory subunits and components of the mitochondrial transcription and replication machinery	

=== Clinical significance ===
Uncharacterized protein C14orf80 has been associated with tumors in the breast, CNS, endometrium, large intestine, lung, skin, and stomach.
