= FAM162A =

Protein-coding gene in the species Homo sapiens

Identifiers
- Aliases: FAM162A, C3orf28, E2IG5, HGTD-P, family with sequence similarity 162 member A
- External IDs: OMIM: 608017; MGI: 1917436; HomoloGene: 8656; GeneCards: FAM162A; OMA:FAM162A - orthologs

Gene location (Human)
Chr.	Chromosome 3 (human)
Band	3q21.1	Start	122,384,161 bp
Band	3q21.1	End	122,412,334 bp

Gene location (Mouse)
Chr.	Chromosome 16 (mouse)
Band	16|16 B3	Start	35,864,131 bp
Band	16|16 B3	End	35,891,964 bp
RNA expression pattern
Bgee	Human / Mouse (ortholog); Top expressed in: mucosa of sigmoid colon; vulva; right ventricle; gums; oral cavity; myocardium; gingival epithelium; myocardium of left ventricle; mucosa of transverse colon; human penis / Top expressed in: endocardial cushion; atrioventricular valve; esophagus; condyle; atrium; embryo; cumulus cell; umbilical cord; embryo; gastrula; More reference expression data
BioGPS	n/a
Gene ontology
Molecular function	protein binding
Cellular component	integral component of membrane; membrane; mitochondrion; cytosol
Biological process	apoptotic process; neuron apoptotic process; positive regulation of release of cytochrome c from mitochondria; activation of cysteine-type endopeptidase activity involved in apoptotic process; cellular response to hypoxia; positive regulation of apoptotic process
Sources:Amigo / QuickGO
Orthologs
Species	Human	Mouse
Entrez	26355	70186
Ensembl	ENSG00000114023	ENSMUSG00000003955
UniProt	Q96A26	Q9D6U8
RefSeq (mRNA)	NM_014367	NM_027342
RefSeq (protein)	NP_055182	NP_081618
Location (UCSC)	Chr 3: 122.38 – 122.41 Mb	Chr 16: 35.86 – 35.89 Mb
PubMed search
- Wikidata
View/Edit Human	View/Edit Mouse

Human growth and transformation-dependent protein (HGTD-P), also called E2-induced gene 5 protein (E2IG5), is a protein that in humans is encoded by the FAM162A gene on chromosome 3. This protein promotes intrinsic apoptosis in response to hypoxia via interactions with hypoxia-inducible factor-1α (HIF-1α). As a result, it has been associated with cerebral ischemia, myocardial infarction, and various cancers.

== Structure ==
HGTD-P contains two transmembrane domains that are required for its localization to the mitochondria and induction of cell death.

== Function ==
HGTD-P localizes to the mitochondria, where it participates in regulation of apoptosis. This localization is aided by the chaperone Hsp90, which is required to stabilize the protein during the transit. HGTD-P primarily acts in response to hypoxia by interacting with HIF-1α, which then triggers apoptotic cascades that result in the release of cytochrome C, induction of mitochondrial permeability transition, and activation of caspase-9 and 3. In neuronal cells, it additionally stimulates mitochondrial release of AIFM1, which then translocates to the nucleus to effect apoptosis, which indicates that it may participate in the caspase-independent apoptotic pathway depending on cell type or organism.

== Clinical significance ==
Human growth and transformation-dependent protein (HGTD-P) is involved in intrinsic apoptosis. Apoptosis, an ancient Greek word used to describe the "falling off" of petals from flowers or leaves from trees, is a highly regulated, evolutionarily conserved, and energy-requiring process by which activation of specific signaling cascades ultimately leads to cell death. An apoptotic cell undergoes structural changes including cell shrinkage, plasma membrane blebbing, nuclear condensation, and fragmentation of the DNA and nucleus. This is followed by fragmentation into apoptotic bodies that are quickly removed by phagocytes, thereby preventing an inflammatory response. It is a mode of cell death defined by characteristic morphological, biochemical and molecular changes. It was first described as a "shrinkage necrosis", and then this term was replaced by apoptosis to emphasize its role opposite mitosis in tissue kinetics. During apoptosis the cell decrease in size, loose contact with neighboring cells, and loose specialized surface elements such as microvilli and cell-cell junctions. A shift of fluid out of the cells causes cytoplasm condensation, which is followed by convolution of the nuclear and cellular outlines. In later stages of apoptosis the entire cell becomes fragmented, forming a number of plasma membrane-bounded apoptotic bodies which contain nuclear and or cytoplasmic elements. The ultrastructural appearance of necrosis is quite different, the main features being mitochondrial swelling, plasma membrane breakdown and cellular disintegration. Apoptosis occurs in many physiological and pathological processes. It plays an important role during embryonal development as programmed cell death and accompanies a variety of normal involutional processes in which it serves as a mechanism to remove "unwanted" cells.

Due to its involvement in hypoxia, HGTD-P has been implicated in cerebral ischemia and myocardial infarction, as well as numerous cancers, including cervical cancer and gastric cancer. In the case of cervical cancer, HGTD-P is expressed in the early developmental stages and, thus, may prove useful as a diagnostic marker to control the spread of the cancer. Despite its proapoptotic function, HGTD-P has been observed to coordinate with HIF-1α to promote cell growth and proliferation under hypoxic conditions in cervical cancer. In the case of hypoxia-ischemia brain damage, the microRNA agomir, miR-139-5p, attenuates HGTD-P expression and brain damage, and has the therapeutic potential to treat hypoxia-ischemia brain damage.

== Interactions ==
HGTD-P has been shown to interact with Hsp90 and VDAC.
