= SNCAIP =

Identifiers
- Aliases: SNCAIP, SYPH1, Sph1, synuclein alpha interacting protein
- External IDs: OMIM: 603779; MGI: 1915097; GeneCards: SNCAIP
Available structures
PDB	Ortholog search: PDBe RCSB
PDB	List of PDB id codes 2KES

Gene location (Human)
Chr.	Chromosome 5 (human)
Band	5q23.2	Start	122,311,354 bp
Band	5q23.2	End	122,464,219 bp

Gene location (Mouse)
Chr.	Chromosome 18 (mouse)
Band	18|18 D1	Start	52,900,781 bp
Band	18|18 D1	End	53,049,007 bp
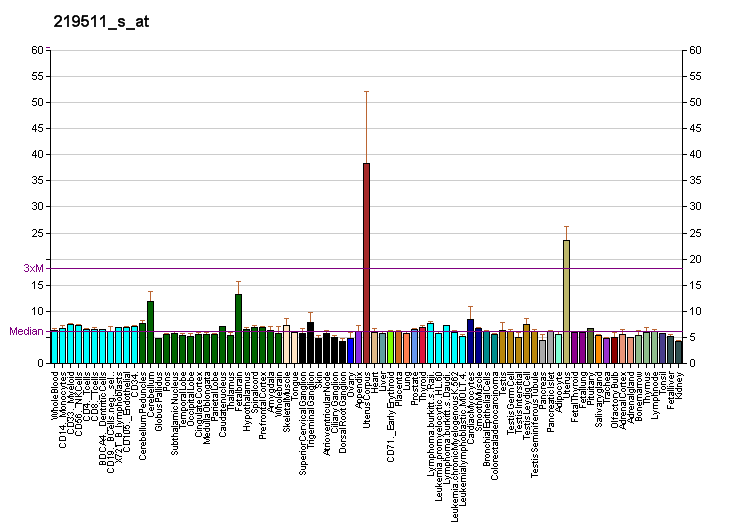
RNA expression pattern
Bgee	Human / Mouse (ortholog); Top expressed in: ventricular zone; ganglionic eminence; germinal epithelium; periodontal fiber; endometrium; parietal pleura; stromal cell of endometrium; epithelium of bronchus; bronchial epithelial cell; myometrium / Top expressed in: genital tubercle; ventricular zone; ganglionic eminence; lumbar subsegment of spinal cord; external carotid artery; saccule; internal carotid artery; neural tube; Rostral migratory stream; renal corpuscle; More reference expression data
BioGPS	More reference expression data
Gene ontology
Molecular function	protein binding; ubiquitin protein ligase binding; identical protein binding
Cellular component	cytoplasm; cytosol; soma; presynaptic membrane; synaptic vesicle; nucleoplasm; cytoplasmic ribonucleoprotein granule
Biological process	regulation of inclusion body assembly; dopamine metabolic process; cell death; regulation of neurotransmitter secretion
Sources:Amigo / QuickGO
Orthologs
Databases	NCBI: entry; OMA: entry
Species	Human	Mouse
Entrez	9627	67847
Ensembl	ENSG00000064692	ENSMUSG00000024534
UniProt	Q9Y6H5	Q99ME3
RefSeq (mRNA)	NM_001242935; NM_001308100; NM_001308105; NM_001308106; NM_001308107 NM_001308108; NM_001308109; NM_005460	NM_001199151; NM_001199153; NM_001199154; NM_026408
RefSeq (protein)	NP_001229864; NP_001295029; NP_001295034; NP_001295035; NP_001295036 NP_001295037; NP_001295038; NP_005451	NP_001186080; NP_001186082; NP_001186083; NP_080684; NP_001390575 NP_001390576; NP_001390577
Location (UCSC)	Chr 5: 122.31 – 122.46 Mb	Chr 18: 52.9 – 53.05 Mb
PubMed search
- Wikidata
View/Edit Human	View/Edit Mouse

Synphilin-1 is a protein that in humans is encoded by the SNCAIP gene. SNCAIP stands for "synuclein, alpha interacting protein".

Synphilin-1 is a cytosolic protein first identified in 1999 as a novel binding partner of α-synuclein, localized within Lewy bodies in Parkinson's disease brain tissue. Experimental studies in mammalian cells and yeast demonstrated that co-expression of synphilin-1 with α-synuclein promotes the formation of cytoplasmic inclusions resembling Lewy bodies.

== Structure ==
The SNCAIP gene encodes synphilin-1, a multi-domain protein with a complex structure integral to neuronal function and implicated in neurodegenerative diseases. Structurally, synphilin-1 is composed of approximately 919 amino acids and is characterized by several functional domains, notably including six ankyrin repeats and a central coiled-coil domain spanning residues 510–557. These domains are typical protein-protein interaction motifs, facilitating synphilin-1's ability to interact with partner proteins such as alpha-synuclein (SNCA). SNCAIP binds to the N-terminal region of SNCA, allowing synphilin-1 to play a role in the formation of cytosolic inclusions mimicking Lewy bodies, which are hallmark features of synucleinopathies. The ankyrin repeats provide scaffolding for additional protein interactions, while the coiled-coil domain is crucial for the association with alpha-synuclein and possibly other synaptic or vesicular components.

== Function ==
SNCAIP encodes synphilin-1, a cytoplasmic protein that interacts with alpha-synuclein in neuronal tissue and is involved in a variety of physiological processes related to synaptic function and protein homeostasis. Synphilin-1 is developmentally localized to synaptic terminals and participates in the regulation of synaptic vesicle trafficking. It may act as a scaffold protein, contributing to cellular processes like protein degradation through the ubiquitin-proteasome system and autophagy. Experimental evidence suggests that binding of synphilin-1 to alpha-synuclein can modulate synaptic vesicle dynamics, potentially impacting neurotransmitter release and synaptic plasticity. Synphilin-1's cytoprotective effects include inhibiting mitochondrial dysfunction, reducing reactive oxygen species production, and promoting neuronal survival under certain conditions.

== Ubiquitination ==
Synphilin-1 undergoes ubiquitination. Parkin (an E3 ligase) modifies synphilin-1 and, together with α-synuclein, promotes the formation of ubiquitin-positive inclusion bodies. Mutations in parkin gene disrupt this activity. Additional E3 ligases, including SIAH1 and SIAH2, also ubiquitinate synphilin-1, influencing whether the protein is directed to proteasomal degradation or accumulates in inclusions. Inclusions containing α-synuclein and synphilin-1 share features with aggresomes, which may act to sequester misfolded proteins and limit cellular toxicity.

== Clinical significance ==
Clinically, synphilin-1 is heavily implicated in neurodegenerative diseases, particularly Parkinson's disease (PD). It serves as a major component of Lewy bodies—the pathological protein aggregates characteristic of PD—and contributes to the formation of these cytoplasmic inclusions. While wild-type synphilin-1 may help sequester potentially toxic protein aggregates, certain isoforms and mutants, such as synphilin-1A, are highly aggregation-prone and associated with neuronal toxicity and degeneration. Genetic variation and altered methylation of the SNCAIP gene are linked with increased vulnerability to PD and related synucleinopathies. Thus, synphilin-1 exerts complex effects on neuronal health, acting as both a potential protector and a contributor to disease pathology depending on its expression, isoform, and interaction context.

Beyond Parkinson's disease, synphilin-1 has recently been implicated in glioblastoma. Transcriptomic and single-cell RNA sequencing analyses identified SNCAIP among histone lactylation related genes upregulated in glioblastoma, with elevated expression correlating with poorer patient survival. This has raised interest in synphilin-1 as a potential biomarker in cancer biology.

== Interactions ==
SNCAIP has been shown to interact with:

- Alpha-synuclein and
- Parkin (ligase).
