= Parkin (protein) =

Mammalian protein found in humans

PRKN
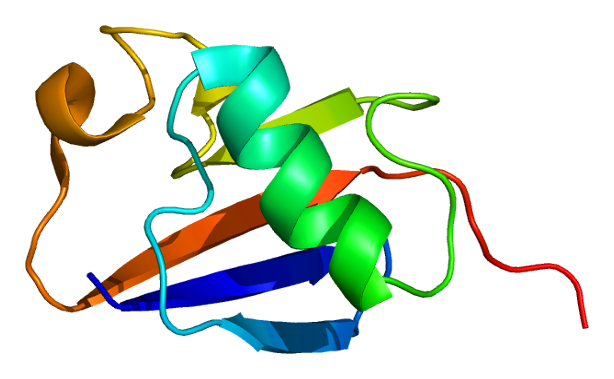

Identifiers
- Aliases: PRKN, parkin RBR E3 ubiquitin protein ligase, AR-JP, LPRS2, PDJ, PARK2, Parkin
- External IDs: OMIM: 602544; MGI: 1355296; GeneCards: PRKN
Available structures
PDB	Ortholog search: PDBe RCSB
PDB	List of PDB id codes 1IYF, 2JMO, 4I1F, 4I1H, 4BM9, 5C1Z, 5C23, 5C9V
Enzyme activity
EC #	BRENDA	ExPASy	KEGG	MetaCyc
2.3.2.31	↗	↗	↗	↗

Gene location (Human)
Chr.	Chromosome 6 (human)
Band	6q26	Start	161,347,417 bp
Band	6q26	End	162,727,775 bp

Gene location (Mouse)
Chr.	Chromosome 17 (mouse)
Band	17 A1|17 7.8 cM	Start	11,059,271 bp
Band	17 A1|17 7.8 cM	End	12,282,248 bp
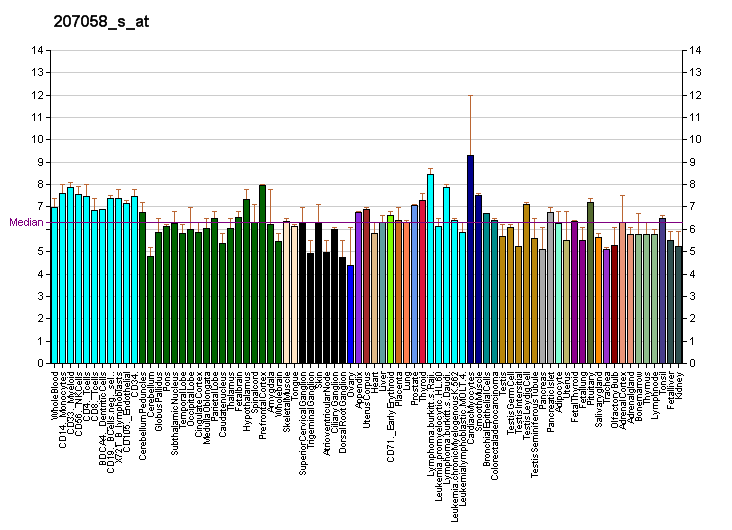
RNA expression pattern
Bgee	Human / Mouse (ortholog); Top expressed in: sural nerve; testicle; muscle of thigh; sperm; Achilles tendon; gastrocnemius muscle; gonad; prefrontal cortex; right auricle of heart; left testis / Top expressed in: muscle of thigh; embryo; spermatocyte; embryo; spermatid; zygote; soleus muscle; knee joint; morula; right kidney; More reference expression data
BioGPS	More reference expression data
Gene ontology
Molecular function	phospholipase binding; DNA-binding transcription factor activity; SH3 domain binding; histone deacetylase binding; tubulin binding; cullin family protein binding; PDZ domain binding; heat shock protein binding; metal ion binding; Hsp70 protein binding; kinase binding; enzyme binding; beta-catenin binding; zinc ion binding; protein binding; ubiquitin conjugating enzyme binding; protein kinase binding; chaperone binding; transcription cis-regulatory region binding; ubiquitin-protein transferase activity; F-box domain binding; ubiquitin binding; identical protein binding; actin binding; ubiquitin-specific protease binding; G protein-coupled receptor binding; ubiquitin protein ligase binding; transferase activity; ubiquitin protein ligase activity; DNA-binding transcription repressor activity, RNA polymerase II-specific; protein-containing complex binding
Cellular component	cytoplasm; cytosol; mitochondrion; perinuclear region of cytoplasm; nucleus; Lewy body; SCF ubiquitin ligase complex; aggresome; endoplasmic reticulum; Golgi apparatus; Parkin-FBXW7-Cul1 ubiquitin ligase complex; ubiquitin ligase complex; LUBAC complex; presynapse; neuron projection; mitochondrion-derived vesicle; nuclear speck; protein-containing complex
Biological process	negative regulation of neuron apoptotic process; protein K29-linked ubiquitination; negative regulation of insulin secretion; ERAD pathway; positive regulation of mitochondrial fission; positive regulation of mitophagy in response to mitochondrial depolarization; positive regulation of protein catabolic process; synaptic transmission, glutamatergic; positive regulation of tumor necrosis factor-mediated signaling pathway; neuron cellular homeostasis; regulation of protein ubiquitination; cellular response to toxic substance; modulation of chemical synaptic transmission; regulation of synaptic vesicle transport; learning; protein monoubiquitination; synaptic transmission, dopaminergic; positive regulation of neurotransmitter uptake; regulation of glucose metabolic process; protein K6-linked ubiquitination; negative regulation of intrinsic apoptotic signaling pathway by p53 class mediator; negative regulation of spontaneous neurotransmitter secretion; negative regulation by host of viral genome replication; positive regulation of DNA binding; macroautophagy; negative regulation of canonical Wnt signaling pathway; Unfolded protein response; aggresome assembly; proteasome-mediated ubiquitin-dependent protein catabolic process; regulation of dopamine secretion; zinc ion homeostasis; free ubiquitin chain polymerization; regulation of transcription, DNA-templated; locomotory behavior; norepinephrine metabolic process; negative regulation of endoplasmic reticulum stress-induced neuron intrinsic apoptotic signaling pathway; adult locomotory behavior; protein metabolic process; negative regulation of cell death; response to oxidative stress; protein K27-linked ubiquitination; negative regulation of gene expression; transcription, DNA-templated; response to endoplasmic reticulum stress; protein K11-linked ubiquitination; central nervous system development; negative regulation of oxidative stress-induced cell death; positive regulation of mitochondrial fusion; protein localization to mitochondrion; proteasomal protein catabolic process; cellular response to manganese ion; negative regulation of mitochondrial fusion; protein autoubiquitination; negative regulation of neuron death; negative regulation of protein phosphorylation; negative regulation of endoplasmic reticulum stress-induced intrinsic apoptotic signaling pathway; negative regulation of primary amine oxidase activity; startle response; mitochondrial fission; regulation of mitochondrion organization; regulation of canonical Wnt signaling pathway; negative regulation of release of cytochrome c from mitochondria; protein stabilization; mitochondrion organization; protein polyubiquitination; negative regulation of transcription by RNA polymerase II; regulation of reactive oxygen species metabolic process; regulation of neurotransmitter secretion; positive regulation of protein linear polyubiquitination; protein K48-linked ubiquitination; dopamine uptake involved in synaptic transmission; regulation of autophagy; regulation of protein targeting to mitochondrion; protein destabilization; negative regulation of glucokinase activity; positive regulation of proteasomal protein catabolic process; protein K63-linked ubiquitination; cellular response to dopamine; regulation of lipid transport; negative regulation of actin filament bundle assembly; regulation of dopamine metabolic process; regulation of mitochondrial membrane potential; autophagy; negative regulation of JNK cascade; dopamine metabolic process; positive regulation of gene expression; positive regulation of I-kappaB kinase/NF-kappaB signaling; positive regulation of dendrite extension; negative regulation of reactive oxygen species metabolic process; positive regulation of transcription by RNA polymerase II; mitophagy; protein ubiquitination; parkin-mediated stimulation of mitophagy in response to mitochondrial depolarization; positive regulation of proteasomal ubiquitin-dependent protein catabolic process; protein deubiquitination; regulation of protein stability; positive regulation of protein binding; mitochondrion to lysosome transport; regulation of cellular response to oxidative stress; negative regulation of exosomal secretion; positive regulation of retrograde transport, endosome to Golgi; negative regulation of intralumenal vesicle formation; positive regulation of protein localization to membrane; autophagy of mitochondrion; negative regulation of oxidative stress-induced neuron intrinsic apoptotic signaling pathway; positive regulation of autophagy of mitochondrion; ubiquitin-dependent protein catabolic process; regulation of apoptotic process
Sources:Amigo / QuickGO
Orthologs
Databases	NCBI: entry; OMA: entry
Species	Human	Mouse
Entrez	5071	50873
Ensembl	ENSG00000185345	ENSMUSG00000023826
UniProt	O60260	Q9WVS6
RefSeq (mRNA)	NM_004562; NM_013987; NM_013988	NM_016694; NM_001317726
RefSeq (protein)	NP_004553; NP_054642; NP_054643	NP_001304655; NP_057903
Location (UCSC)	Chr 6: 161.35 – 162.73 Mb	Chr 17: 11.06 – 12.28 Mb
PubMed search
- Wikidata
View/Edit Human	View/Edit Mouse

Parkin is a 465-amino acid residue E3 ubiquitin ligase, a protein that in humans and mice is encoded by the PRKN (also known as PARK2) gene. Parkin plays a critical role in ubiquitination – the process whereby molecules are covalently labelled with ubiquitin (Ub) and directed towards degradation in proteasomes or lysosomes. Ubiquitination involves the sequential action of three enzymes. First, an E1 ubiquitin-activating enzyme binds to inactive Ub in eukaryotic cells via a thioester bond and mobilises it in an ATP-dependent process. Ub is then transferred to an E2 ubiquitin-conjugating enzyme before being conjugated to the target protein via an E3 ubiquitin ligase. There exists a multitude of E3 ligases, which differ in structure and substrate specificity to allow selective targeting of proteins to intracellular degradation.

In particular, parkin recognises proteins on the outer membrane of mitochondria upon cellular insult and mediates the clearance of damaged mitochondria via autophagy and proteasomal mechanisms. Parkin also enhances cell survival by suppressing both mitochondria-dependent and -independent apoptosis. Mutations are associated with mitochondrial dysfunction, leading to neuronal death in Parkinson's disease and aberrant metabolism in tumourigenesis.

== Structure ==
The precise function of parkin is unknown; however, the protein is a component of a multiprotein E3 ubiquitin ligase complex which in turn is part of the ubiquitin-proteasome system that mediates the targeting of proteins for degradation. Mutations in this gene are known to cause a familial form of Parkinson's disease known as autosomal recessive juvenile Parkinson's disease (AR-JP). Moreover, parkin is described to be necessary for mitophagy (autophagy of mitochondria).

However, how loss of function of the parkin protein leads to dopaminergic cell death in this disease is unclear. The prevailing hypothesis is that parkin helps degrade one or more proteins toxic to dopaminergic neurons. Putative substrates of parkin include synphilin-1, CDC-rel1, cyclin E, p38 tRNA synthase, Pael-R, synaptotagmin XI, sp22 and parkin itself (see also ubiquitin ligase). Additionally, parkin contains a C-terminal motif that binds PDZ domains. Parkin has been shown to associate in a PDZ dependent manner with the PDZ domain containing proteins CASK and PICK1.

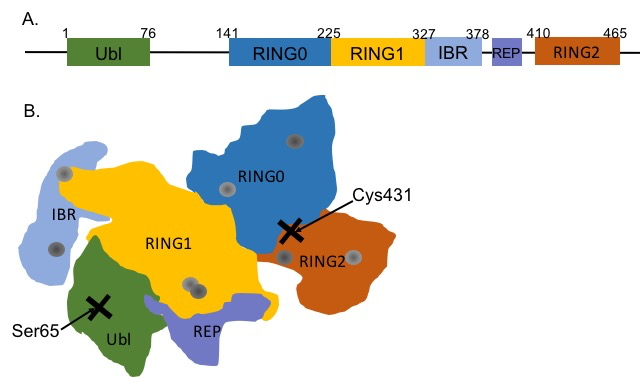
A. Schematic diagram delineating arrangement of parkin functional domains. B. Cartoon representation of parkin in its autoinhibited state, with the catalytic cysteine in RING2 occluded by RING0 while Ubl and REP linker prevents E2 from binding to RING1. RING0, RING1, IBR and RING2 each coordinate two Zn ions (approximate location denoted by grey circles) for structural stability, leading to a stoichiometry of 8 Zn2+/parkin.

Like other members of the RING-between-RING (RBR) family of E3 ligases, parkin possesses two RING finger domains and an in-between-RING (IBR) region. RING1 forms the binding site for E2 Ub-conjugating enzyme while RING2 contains the catalytic cysteine residue (Cys431) that cleaves Ub off E2 and transiently binds it to E3 via a thioester bond. Ub transfer is aided by neighbouring residues histidine His433, which accepts a proton from Cys431 to activate it, and glutamate Glu444, which is involved in autoubiquitination. Together these form the catalytic triad, whose assembly is required for parkin activation. Parkin also contains an N-terminal Ub-like domain (Ubl) for specific substrate recognition, a unique RING0 domain and a repressor (REP) region that tonically suppresses ligase activity.

Under resting conditions, the tightly coiled conformation of parkin renders it inactive, as access to the catalytic RING2 residue is sterically blocked by RING0, while the E2 binding domain on RING1 is occluded by Ubl and REP. Activating stimuli disrupt these interdomain interactions and induce parkin to collapse along the RING1-RING0 interface. The active site of RING2 is drawn towards E2-Ub bound to RING1, facilitating formation of the Ub-thioester intermediate. Parkin activation requires phosphorylation of serine Ser65 in Ubl by serine/threonine kinase, PINK1. Addition of a charged phosphate destabilises hydrophobic interactions between Ubl and neighbouring subregions, reducing autoinhibitory effects of this N-terminus domain. Ser65Ala missense mutations were found to ablate Ub-parkin binding whilst inhibiting parkin recruitment to damaged mitochondria. PINK1 also phosphorylates Ub at Ser65, accelerating its discharge from E2 and enhancing its affinity for parkin.

Although structural changes following phosphorylation are uncertain, crystallisation of parkin revealed a cationic pocket in RING0 formed by lysine and arginine residues Lys161, Arg163 and Lys211 that forms a putative phosphate binding site. Considering that RING0 is unique to parkin and that its hydrophobic interface with RING1 buries Cys431 in inactive parkin, targeting of phosphorylated Ub and/or Ubl towards this binding niche might be critical in dismantling autoinhibitory complexes during parkin activation.

== Function ==
=== Mitophagy ===
Parkin plays a crucial role in mitophagy and clearance of reactive oxygen species. Mitophagy is the elimination of damaged mitochondria in autophagosomes, and is dependent on a positive feedback cycle involving synergistic action of parkin and PINK1. Following severe cellular insult, rundown of mitochondrial membrane potential prevents import of PINK1 into the mitochondrial matrix and causes it to aggregate on the outer mitochondrial membrane (OMM). Parkin is recruited to mitochondria following depolarisation and phosphorylated by PINK1, which simultaneously phosphorylates Ub pre-conjugated to mitochondrial membrane proteins. PINK1 and Ub phosphorylation facilitate parkin activation and further assembly of mono- and poly-Ub chains. Considering the proximity of these chains to PINK1, further phosphorylation of Ub at Ser65 is likely, potentiating parkin mobilisation and substrate ubiquitination in a self-reinforcing cycle.

Parkin substrates include mitofusins Mfn1 and Mfn2, which are large GTPases that promote mitochondria fusion into dynamic, tubular complexes that maximise efficiency of oxidative phosphorylation. However, upon mitochondrial damage, degradation of fusion proteins is necessary to separate them from the network via mitochondrial fission and prevent the corruption of healthy mitochondria. Parkin is therefore required before mitophagy as it ubiquinates Mfn1/2, labelling it for proteasomal degradation. Proteomic studies identified additional OMM proteins as parkin substrates, including fission protein FIS, its adaptor TBC1D15 and translocase TOMM20 and TOMM70 that facilitate movement of proteins such as PINK1 across OMM. Miro (or RHOT1/RHOT2) is an OMM protein critical for axonal transport, and may be ubiquitinated and targeted towards proteasomal degradation by parkin. Miro breakdown produced a marked decrease in migration of compromised mitochondria along axons of mouse hippocampal neurons, reinforcing the importance of parkin in segregating defective mitochondria from their functioning counterparts and limiting the spatial spread of mitochondrial dysfunction, prior to autophagy.

During mitophagy, parkin targets VDAC1, a voltage-gated anion channel that undergoes a conformational change upon mitochondrial membrane depolarisation, exposing a cytosolic domain for ubiquitination. Silencing of VDAC1 expression in HeLa cells significantly reduced parkin recruitment to depolarised mitochondria and their subsequent clearance, highlighting the critical role of VDAC1 as a selective marker of mitochondrial damage and instigator of mitophagy. Following Ub conjugation, parkin recruits autophagy receptors such as p62, TAX1BP1 and CALCOCO2, facilitating assembly of autophagosomes that digest defective mitochondria.

=== Cell survival ===
Through activation of NF-κB signalling, parkin enhances survival and protects cells from stress-induced apoptosis. Upon cellular insult, parkin activates the catalytic HOIP subunit of another E3 ligase LUBAC. HOIP triggers assembly of linear Ub polymers on NF-κB essential modulator (NEMO), potentiating transcription of mitochondrial GTPase OPA1. Increased OPA1 translation maintains cristae structure and reduces cytochrome C release from mitochondria, inhibiting caspase-mediated apoptosis. Importantly, parkin activates HOIP with greater potency than other LUBAC-associated factors HOIL-1 and sharpin, meaning that parkin mobilisation significantly enhances tolerance to moderate stressors.

Parkin possesses DNA binding affinity and produces a dose-dependent reduction in transcription and activity of pro-apoptotic factor p53. Transfection of p53 promoter with truncated versions of parkin into SH-SY5Y neurons revealed that parkin directly binds to the p53 promoter via its RING1 domain. Conversely, parkin may be a transcriptional target of p53 in H460 lung cells, where it mediates the tumour suppressor action of p53. Considering its role in mitochondrial homeostasis, parkin aids p53 in maintaining mitochondrial respiration while limiting glucose uptake and lactate production, thus preventing onset of the Warburg effect during tumourigenesis. Parkin further elevates cytosolic glutathione levels and protects against oxidative stress, characterising it as a critical tumour suppressor with anti-glycolytic and antioxidant capabilities.

== Clinical significance ==
=== Parkinson's disease ===
PARK2 (OMIM *602544) is the parkin gene that may cause a form of autosomal recessive juvenile Parkinson disease (OMIM 600116) due to a mutation in the parkin protein. This form of genetic mutation may be one of the most common known genetic causes of early-onset Parkinson disease. In one study of patients with onset of Parkinson disease prior to age 40 (10% of all PD patients), 18% had parkin mutations, with 5% homozygous mutations. Patients with an autosomal recessive family history of parkinsonism are much more likely to carry parkin mutations if age at onset is less than 20 (80% vs. 28% with onset over age 40).

Patients with parkin mutations (PARK2) do not have Lewy bodies. Such patients develop a syndrome that closely resembles the sporadic form of PD; however, they tend to develop symptoms at a much younger age. In humans, loss-of-function mutations in parkin PARK2 gene have been implicated in 50% of inherited and 15% of juvenile-onset sporadic forms of Parkinson's disease (PD). While PD is traditionally regarded a late-onset neurodegenerative condition characterised by alpha-synuclein-enriched Lewy bodies, autosomal recessive PD due to parkin mutations is often early onset and lack the ubiquitinated protein deposits pathognomonic for sporadic PD. Parkin-mutant PD could also involve loss of noradrenergic neurons in the locus coeruleus alongside the hallmark degeneration of dopaminergic neurons in the substantia nigra pars compacta (SNpc). However, its symptoms resembles those of idiopathic PD, with patients presenting with resting tremors, postural instability and bradykinesia.

While mitochondria are essential for ATP generation in any eukaryotic cell, catecholaminergic neurons are particularly reliant on their proper function for clearance of reactive oxygen species produced by dopamine metabolism, and to supply high energy requirements of catecholamine synthesis. Their susceptibility to oxidative damage and metabolic stress render catecholaminergic neurons vulnerable to neurotoxicity associated with aberrant regulation of mitochondrial activity, as is postulated to occur in both inherited and idiopathic PD. For example, enhanced oxidative stress in neurons, skeletal muscle and platelets, corresponding with reduced activity of complex I in the electron transport chain were reported in PD patients, while deletions in the mitochondrial genome were found in the SNpc.

In accordance with its critical role in mitochondrial quality control, more than 120 pathogenic, PD-inducing mutations have been characterised on parkin. Such mutations may be hereditary or stochastic and are associated with structural instability, reduced catalytic efficiency and aberrant substrate binding and ubiquitination. Mutations can generally be categorised into three groups, depending on their location. Firstly, those clustered around Zn-coordinating residues on RING and IBR might compromise structural integrity and impair catalysis. A second class of mutations, including Thr240Arg, affect residues in and around the E2 binding site and alter autoinhibition of RING1 by REP. Finally, Cys431Phe and Gly430Asp mutations impair ligase activity at the catalytic site and significantly reduce parkin function.

The discovery of numerous non-mitochondrial parkin substrates reinforces the importance parkin in neuronal homeostasis, beyond its role in mitochondrial regulation. Potent neuroprotective abilities of parkin in attenuating dopaminergic neurotoxicity, mitochondrial swelling and excitotoxicity were demonstrated in cell cultures over-expressing parkin, although the existence of such mechanisms at physiological parkin levels in vivo is yet unconfirmed. Another parkin substrate, synphilin-1 (encoded by SNCAIP), is an alpha-synuclein interacting protein that is enriched in the core of Lewy bodies and ubiquitinated by parkin in a manner abolished by familial PD-associated mutations. Parkin might promote aggregation of alpha-synuclein and synphilin-1 into Lewy bodies, which are conjugated to Lys63-linked poly-Ub chains and directed towards autophagic degradation. Parkin mutations therefore inhibit this mechanism, leading to toxic accumulation of soluble proteins that overloads the proteasome. Protein aggregation triggers neuronal toxicity, whilst accounting for lack of ubiquitinated Lewy bodies in parkin-mutant PD. Similarly, native parkin reduces death of SH-SY5Y neurons by ubiquitinating other Lewy body constituents, such as the p38 subunit of aminoacyl-tRNA synthetase complex and far upstream element-binding protein 1 through addition of Lys48-linked poly-Ub chains and directing them towards proteasomal degradation. Parkin also influences axonal transport and vesicle fusion through ubiquitination of tubulin and synaptotagmin XI (SYT11) respectively, giving it a modulatory role in synapse function.

Finally, parkin protects dopaminergic neurons from cytotoxicity induced by PD-mimetic 6-OHDA, mediated by suppression of neuronal p53 expression and its downstream activation of the apoptotic cascade. Several PD-associated parkin mutations are localised to RING1 and might impair its ability to bind and downregulate the p53 promoter, leading to enhanced p53 expression. Parkin-mutant PD patients also exhibit a four-fold elevation in p53 immunoreactivity, insinuating that failure of parkin-mediated anti-apoptosis might be involved in etiology of PD.

=== Tumourigenesis ===
Consistent with parkin's potent anti-tumourigenic abilities, negative mutations and deletions have been reported in various tumours. For example, PARK2 copy number was reduced in 85% of glioblastoma samples while lung cancers were associated with heterozygous deletion of PARK2 at 6q25-q27 locus. Parkin deficiency further diminished disease-free survival in infrared-irradiated mice without increasing tumour incidence rate, suggesting that parkin deficiencies increase susceptibility to tumour-promoting events, rather than initiating tumour formation. Similarly, chromosomal breaks in PARK2 suppressed expression of afadin scaffold protein in breast cancer, thereby comprising epithelial integrity, enhancing metastatic potential and worsening overall prognosis. Haploinsufficient PARK2 expression, either due to reduced copy number or DNA hypermethylation, was further detected in spontaneous colorectal cancer where it accelerated all stages of intestinal adenoma development in mouse models. Parkin is therefore a potent modulator of tumour progression, without directly instigating tumourigenesis.

== Interactions ==
Parkin (ligase) has been shown to interact with:

- Alpha-synuclein,
- CASK,
- CUL1,
- FBXW7 and
- GPR37,
- HSPA1A,
- HSPA8,
- Multisynthetase complex auxiliary component p38,
- PDCD2,
- SEPT5,
- SNCAIP,
- STUB1,
- SYT11, and
- Ubiquitin C.
