= GPR37 =

Protein-coding gene in the species Homo sapiens

Identifiers
- Aliases: GPR37, EDNRBL, PAELR, hET(B)R-LP, G protein-coupled receptor 37
- External IDs: OMIM: 602583; MGI: 1313297; GeneCards: GPR37

Gene location (Human)
| Chr. | Chromosome 7 (human) |
| Band | 7q31.33 | Start | 124,743,885 bp |
| Band | 7q31.33 | End | 124,765,792 bp |

Gene location (Mouse)
| Chr. | Chromosome 6 (mouse) |
| Band | 6 A3.1|6 11.65 cM | Start | 25,665,877 bp |
| Band | 6 A3.1|6 11.65 cM | End | 25,690,728 bp |
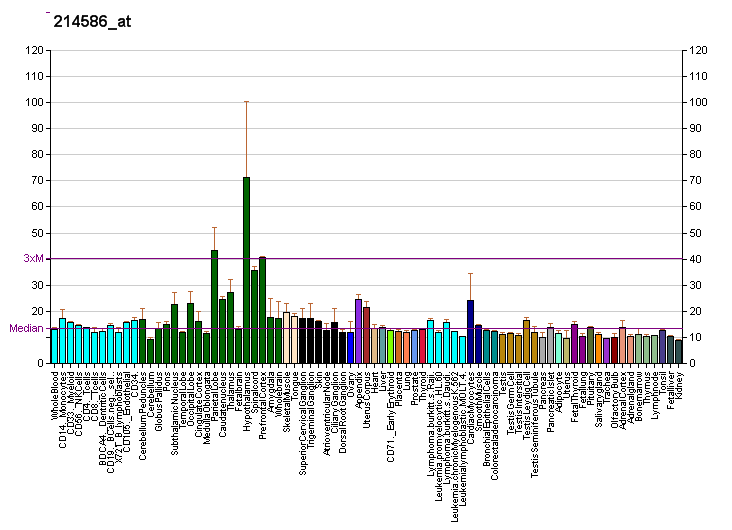

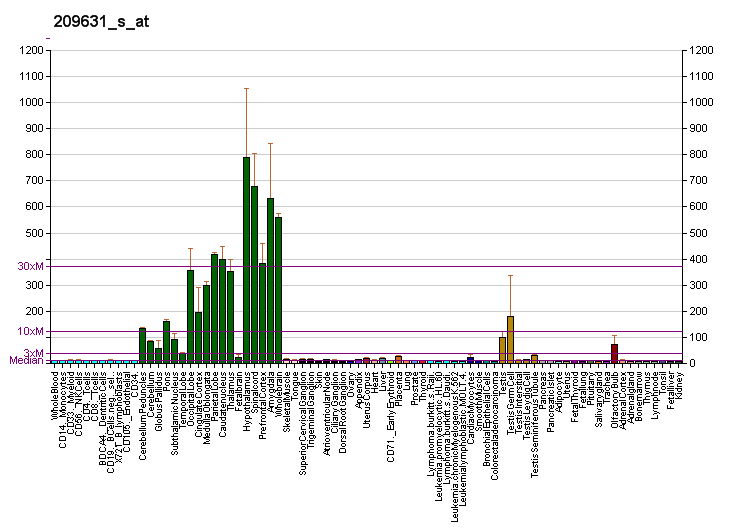
RNA expression pattern
| Bgee | Human / Mouse (ortholog); Top expressed in: secondary oocyte; inferior ganglion of vagus nerve; optic nerve; middle frontal gyrus; subthalamic nucleus; medulla oblongata; ventral tegmental area; superior vestibular nucleus; external globus pallidus; inferior olivary nucleus / Top expressed in: deep cerebellar nuclei; lumbar subsegment of spinal cord; globus pallidus; lateral geniculate nucleus; utricle; vestibular sensory epithelium; pontine nuclei; medial geniculate nucleus; anterior horn of spinal cord; ventral tegmental area; More reference expression data |
| BioGPS | More reference expression data |
Gene ontology
| Molecular function | G protein-coupled peptide receptor activity; G protein-coupled receptor activity; heat shock protein binding; prosaposin receptor activity; peptide binding; signal transducer activity; Hsp70 protein binding; protein binding; ubiquitin protein ligase binding |
| Cellular component | integral component of membrane; endoplasmic reticulum membrane; membrane; ubiquitin ligase complex; receptor complex; plasma membrane; integral component of plasma membrane; endoplasmic reticulum |
| Biological process | G protein-coupled receptor signaling pathway; adenylate cyclase-inhibiting G protein-coupled receptor signaling pathway; dopamine biosynthetic process; negative regulation of hydrogen peroxide-induced cell death; locomotion involved in locomotory behavior; positive regulation of MAPK cascade; signal transduction; positive regulation of dopamine metabolic process |
Sources:Amigo / QuickGO
Orthologs
| Databases | NCBI: entry; OMA: entry |
| Species | Human | Mouse |
| Entrez | 2861 | 14763 |
| Ensembl | ENSG00000170775 | ENSMUSG00000039904 |
| UniProt | O15354 | Q9QY42 |
| RefSeq (mRNA) | NM_005302 | NM_010338 |
| RefSeq (protein) | NP_005293 | NP_034468 |
| Location (UCSC) | Chr 7: 124.74 – 124.77 Mb | Chr 6: 25.67 – 25.69 Mb |
| PubMed search |
- Wikidata
| View/Edit Human | View/Edit Mouse |

Probable G-protein coupled receptor 37 is a protein that in humans is encoded by the GPR37 gene. GPR37 is primarily found in the central nervous system (CNS), with significant expression observed in various CNS regions including the amygdala, basal ganglia (caudate, putamen, and nucleus accumbens), substantia nigra, hippocampus, frontal cortex, and hypothalamus, particularly noteworthy is its exceptionally elevated expression in the spinal cord.

== Interactions ==
GPR37 has been shown to interact with HSPA1A and Parkin (ligase). GPR37 is a receptor for prosaposin. It was previously thought to be a receptor for head activator, a neuropeptide found in the hydra, but early reports of head activator in mammals were never confirmed. To address challenges in confirming ligand-GPR37 interactions using recombinant GPR37 expressed in HEK293 cells, recent research has turned to primary cell cultures, leading to successful ligand identification. These investigations have unveiled the involvement of osteocalcin with GPR37 to regulate processes such as oligodendrocyte differentiation, myelination, myelin production, and remyelination following demyelinating injuries. Furthermore, osteocalcin treatment has demonstrated protective effects against Lipopolysaccharide-induced inflammation, which are absent in GPR37-deficient mice.

GPR37 signaling has been shown to modulate the migration of olfactory ensheathing cells (OECs) and gonadotropin-releasing hormone (GnRH) cells in mice.
