= SYT11 =

Protein-coding gene in humans

Identifiers
- Aliases: SYT11, SYT12, sytXI, synaptotagmin 11
- External IDs: OMIM: 608741; MGI: 1859547; GeneCards: SYT11

Gene location (Human)
Chr.	Chromosome 1 (human)
Band	1q22	Start	155,859,567 bp
Band	1q22	End	155,885,199 bp

Gene location (Mouse)
Chr.	Chromosome 3 (mouse)
Band	3 F1|3 38.96 cM	Start	88,652,007 bp
Band	3 F1|3 38.96 cM	End	88,682,471 bp
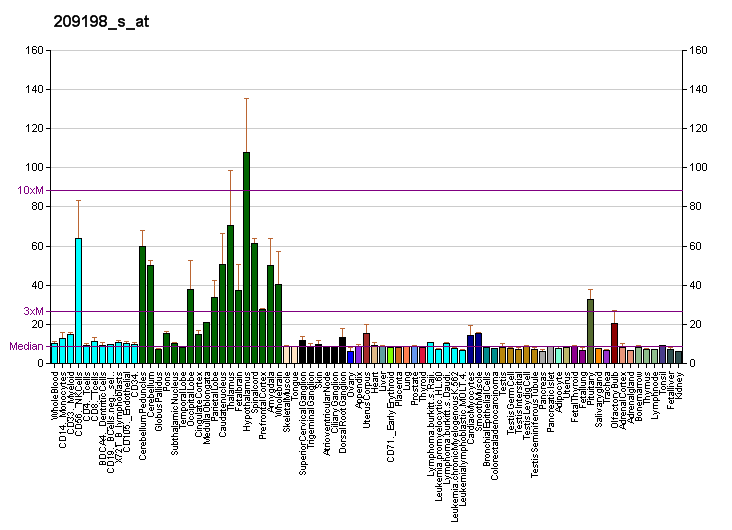

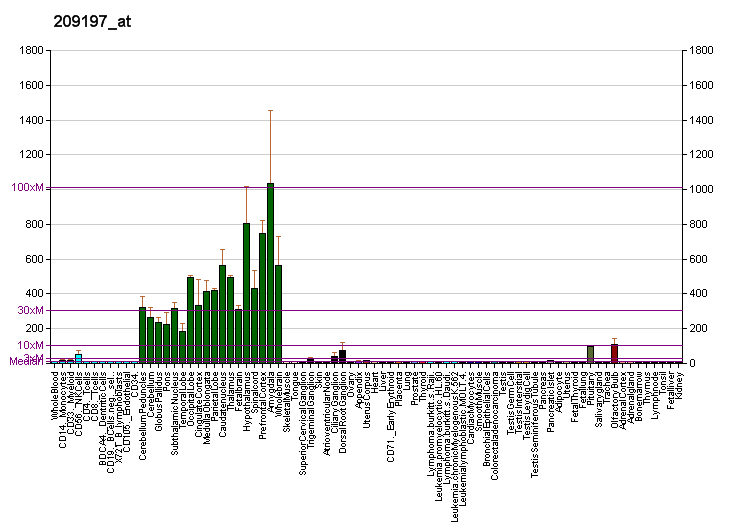
RNA expression pattern
Bgee	Human / Mouse (ortholog); Top expressed in: ventricular zone; external globus pallidus; lateral nuclear group of thalamus; inferior ganglion of vagus nerve; postcentral gyrus; pars reticulata; prefrontal cortex; Brodmann area 46; pars compacta; ventral tegmental area / Top expressed in: motor neuron; Rostral migratory stream; anterior horn of spinal cord; substantia nigra; dorsomedial hypothalamic nucleus; ventral tegmental area; pontine nuclei; subiculum; medial dorsal nucleus; dorsal tegmental nucleus; More reference expression data
BioGPS	More reference expression data
Gene ontology
Molecular function	clathrin binding; calcium ion binding; syntaxin binding; protein binding; metal ion binding; translation initiation factor binding; ubiquitin protein ligase binding; SNARE binding; protein homodimerization activity; beta-tubulin binding; calcium-dependent phospholipid binding; phosphatidylserine binding
Cellular component	integral component of membrane; cell junction; synapse; integral component of plasma membrane; synaptic vesicle membrane; membrane; cytoplasmic vesicle; vesicle; phagocytic cup; presynaptic active zone membrane; inhibitory synapse; synaptic vesicle; presynapse; dendritic spine; lysosome; cytoplasm; recycling endosome; postsynaptic density; plasma membrane; cell body; axon; early phagosome; excitatory synapse; neuron projection; terminal bouton; phagocytic vesicle; perinuclear region of cytoplasm; integral component of synaptic vesicle membrane; Schaffer collateral - CA1 synapse; postsynapse; integral component of presynaptic active zone membrane; exocytic vesicle
Biological process	negative regulation of neurotransmitter secretion; regulation of phagosome maturation; regulation of defense response to bacterium; calcium ion-regulated exocytosis of neurotransmitter; negative regulation of synaptic vesicle endocytosis; negative regulation of membrane invagination; vesicle fusion; protein homotetramerization; negative regulation of clathrin-dependent endocytosis; negative regulation of phagocytosis; positive regulation of protein localization to phagocytic vesicle; plasma membrane repair; response to wounding; negative regulation of clathrin-coated pit assembly; calcium ion regulated lysosome exocytosis; regulation of calcium ion-dependent exocytosis; regulation of dopamine secretion; vesicle-mediated transport; calcium-ion regulated exocytosis; cellular response to calcium ion
Sources:Amigo / QuickGO
Orthologs
Databases	NCBI: entry; OMA: entry
Species	Human	Mouse
Entrez	23208	229521
Ensembl	ENSG00000132718	ENSMUSG00000068923
UniProt	Q9BT88	Q9R0N3
RefSeq (mRNA)	NM_152280	NM_018804
RefSeq (protein)	NP_689493	NP_061274
Location (UCSC)	Chr 1: 155.86 – 155.89 Mb	Chr 3: 88.65 – 88.68 Mb
PubMed search
- Wikidata
View/Edit Human	View/Edit Mouse

Synaptotagmin-11 is a protein that in humans is encoded by the SYT11 gene.

== Interactions ==
SYT11 has been shown to interact with Parkin (ligase).
