= HSPA1A =

Protein-coding gene in the species Homo sapiens

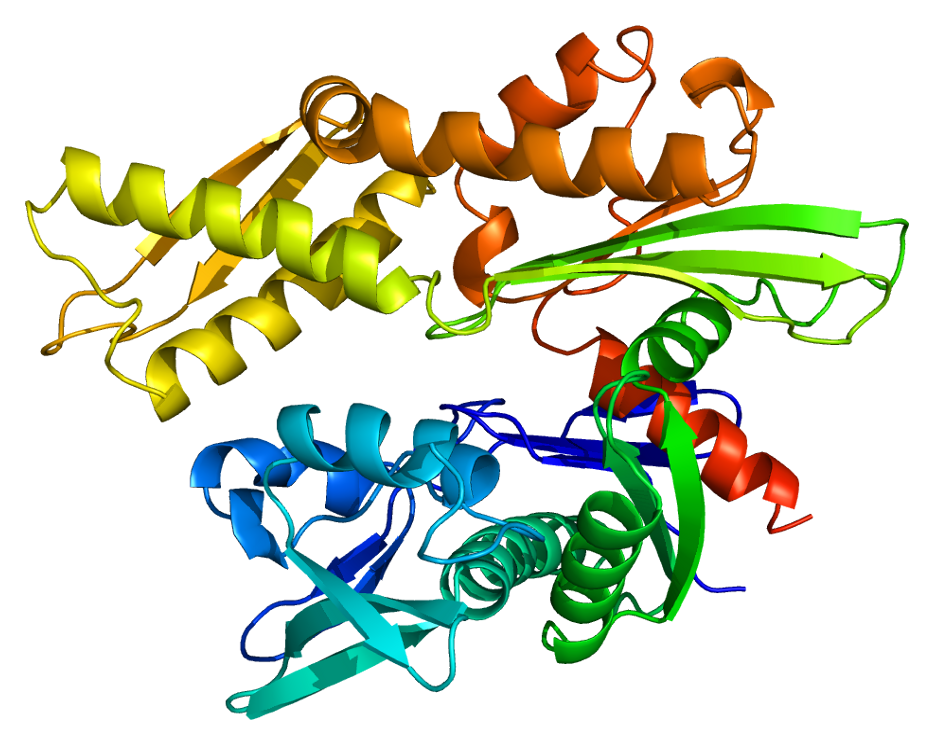

Identifiers
- Aliases: HSPA1A, HEL-S-103, HSP70-1, HSP70-1A, HSP70I, HSP72, HSPA1, HSP70.1, heat shock protein family A (Hsp70) member 1A, HSP70.2, HSP70-2, HSP70
- External IDs: OMIM: 140550; MGI: 96244; GeneCards: HSPA1A
Available structures
PDB	Ortholog search: PDBe RCSB
PDB	List of PDB id codes 1HJO, 1S3X, 1XQS, 2E88, 2E8A, 2LMG, 3A8Y, 3ATU, 3ATV, 3AY9, 3D2E, 3D2F, 3JXU, 3LOF, 4IO8, 4J8F, 4PO2, 4WV5, 4WV7, 5AR0, 5AQZ, 3Q49,%%s3D2E

Gene location (Human)
Chr.	Chromosome 6 (human)
Band	6p21.33	Start	31,815,543 bp
Band	6p21.33	End	31,817,946 bp

Gene location (Mouse)
Chr.	Chromosome 17 (mouse)
Band	17 B1|17 18.51 cM	Start	35,188,166 bp
Band	17 B1|17 18.51 cM	End	35,191,132 bp
RNA expression pattern
Bgee	Human / Mouse (ortholog); Top expressed in: gallbladder; ventricular zone; C1 segment; right auricle of heart; ganglionic eminence; blood; right lobe of liver; muscle layer of sigmoid colon; left ventricle; substantia nigra / Top expressed in: corneal stroma; conjunctival fornix; vestibular membrane of cochlear duct; ciliary body; plantaris muscle; retinal pigment epithelium; skin of external ear; Ileal epithelium; iris; esophagus; More reference expression data
BioGPS	n/a
Gene ontology
Molecular function	nucleotide binding; heat shock protein binding; signaling receptor binding; C3HC4-type RING finger domain binding; ATPase activity; virus receptor activity; histone deacetylase binding; protein folding chaperone activity; G protein-coupled receptor binding; ATP binding; enzyme binding; ubiquitin protein ligase binding; protein binding; transcription corepressor activity; cadherin binding; RNA binding; denatured protein binding; protein N-terminus binding; unfolded protein binding; disordered domain specific binding; misfolded protein binding
Cellular component	blood microparticle; centriole; nucleoplasm; inclusion body; focal adhesion; perinuclear region of cytoplasm; ubiquitin ligase complex; cytosol; extracellular region; ficolin-1-rich granule lumen; centrosome; microtubule organizing center; cytoskeleton; nucleus; cytoplasm; mitochondrion; endoplasmic reticulum; aggresome; nuclear speck; vesicle; extracellular exosome; COP9 signalosome; protein-containing complex; ribonucleoprotein complex
Biological process	cellular response to oxidative stress; regulation of mRNA stability; negative regulation of endoplasmic reticulum stress-induced intrinsic apoptotic signaling pathway; positive regulation of NF-kappaB transcription factor activity; negative regulation of mitochondrial outer membrane permeabilization involved in apoptotic signaling pathway; cellular heat acclimation; negative regulation of inclusion body assembly; positive regulation of tumor necrosis factor-mediated signaling pathway; negative regulation of cell death; positive regulation of gene expression; viral entry into host cell; regulation of cell death; ATP metabolic process; negative regulation of protein ubiquitination; negative regulation of extrinsic apoptotic signaling pathway in absence of ligand; positive regulation of endoribonuclease activity; positive regulation of nucleotide-binding oligomerization domain containing 2 signaling pathway; regulation of protein ubiquitination; positive regulation of interleukin-8 production; regulation of cellular response to heat; cellular response to heat; negative regulation of transforming growth factor beta receptor signaling pathway; positive regulation of proteasomal ubiquitin-dependent protein catabolic process; neutrophil degranulation; negative regulation of transcription from RNA polymerase II promoter in response to stress; protein refolding; positive regulation of microtubule nucleation; regulation of mitotic spindle assembly; mRNA catabolic process; response to unfolded protein; negative regulation of cell population proliferation; negative regulation of cell growth; negative regulation of apoptotic process; protein stabilization; chaperone-mediated protein complex assembly; positive regulation of RNA splicing; Unfolded protein response; positive regulation of erythrocyte differentiation; chaperone cofactor-dependent protein refolding; lysosomal transport; response to heat; telomere maintenance; DNA repair
Sources:Amigo / QuickGO
Orthologs
Databases	NCBI: entry; OMA: entry
Species	Human	Mouse
Entrez	3303	193740
Ensembl	ENSG00000234475; ENSG00000204389; ENSG00000237724; ENSG00000235941; ENSG00000215328 n/a	ENSMUSG00000091971
UniProt	P0DMV8; P0DMV9	Q61696
RefSeq (mRNA)	NM_005345	NM_010479
RefSeq (protein)	NP_005337; NP_005336; NP_005336; NP_005336.3; NP_005337.2	NP_034609
Location (UCSC)	Chr 6: 31.82 – 31.82 Mb	Chr 17: 35.19 – 35.19 Mb
PubMed search
- Wikidata
View/Edit Human	View/Edit Mouse

Heat shock 70 kDa protein 1, also termed Hsp72, is a protein that in humans is encoded by the HSPA1A gene. As a member of the heat shock protein 70 family and a chaperone protein, it facilitates the proper folding of newly translated and misfolded proteins, as well as stabilize or degrade mutant proteins. In addition, Hsp72 also facilitates DNA repair. Its functions contribute to biological processes including signal transduction, apoptosis, protein homeostasis, and cell growth and differentiation. It has been associated with an extensive number of cancers, neurodegenerative diseases, cell senescence and aging, and inflammatory diseases such as diabetes mellitus type 2 and rheumatoid arthritis.

== Structure ==
This intronless gene encodes a 70kDa heat shock protein which is a member of the heat shock protein 70 (Hsp70) family. As a Hsp70 protein, it has a C-terminal protein substrate-binding domain and an N-terminal ATP-binding domain. The substrate-binding domain consists of two subdomains, a two-layered β-sandwich subdomain (SBDβ) and an α-helical subdomain (SBDα), which are connected by the loop Lα,β. SBDβ contains the peptide binding pocket while SBDα serves as a lid to cover the substrate binding cleft. The ATP binding domain consists of four subdomains split into two lobes by a central ATP/ADP binding pocket. The two terminal domains are linked together by a conserved region referred to as loop LL,1, which is critical for allosteric regulation. The unstructured region at the very end of the C-terminal is believed to be the docking site for co-chaperones.

== Function ==
This protein is a member of the Hsp70 family. In conjunction with other heat shock proteins, this protein stabilizes existing proteins against aggregation and mediates the folding of newly translated proteins in the cytosol and in organelles. In order to properly fold non-native proteins, this protein interacts with the hydrophobic peptide segments of proteins in an ATP-controlled fashion. Though the exact mechanism still remains unclear, there are at least two alternative modes of action: kinetic partitioning and local unfolding. In kinetic partitioning, Hsp70s repetitively bind and release substrates in cycles that maintain low concentrations of free substrate. This effectively prevents aggregation while allowing free molecules to fold to the native state. In local unfolding, the binding and release cycles induce localized unfolding in the substrate, which helps to overcome kinetic barriers for folding to the native state. Ultimately, its role in protein folding contributes to its function in signal transduction, apoptosis, protein homeostasis, and cell growth and differentiation.

In addition to the process of protein folding, transport and degradation, this Hsp70 member can preserve the function of mutant proteins. Nonetheless, effects of these mutations can still manifest when Hsp70 chaperones are overwhelmed during stress conditions. Hsp72 also protects against DNA damage and participates in DNA repair, including base excision repair (BER) and nucleotide excision repair (NER). Furthermore, this protein enhances antigen-specific tumor immunity by facilitating more efficient antigen presentation to cytotoxic T cells. It is also involved in the ubiquitin-proteasome pathway through interaction with the AU-rich element RNA-binding protein 1. The gene is located in the major histocompatibility complex class III region, in a cluster with two closely related genes which encode similar proteins. Finally, Hsp72 can protect against disrupted metabolic homeostasis by inducing production of pro-inflammatory cytokines, tumor necrosis factor-α, interleukin 1β, and interleukin-6 in immune cells, thereby reducing inflammation and improving skeletal muscle oxidation. Though at very low levels under normal conditions, HSP72 expression greatly increases under stress, effectively protecting cells from adverse effects in various pathological states.

Along with its role in DNA repair, Hsp72 is also directly involved in caspase-dependent apoptosis by binding Apaf-1, thereby inhibiting procaspase-9 activation and release of cytochrome c. Additionally, Hsp72 has been observed to inhibit apoptosis by preventing the release of SMAC/Diablo and binding XIAP to prevent its degradation. Hsp72 is also involved in caspase-independent apoptosis, as it also binds AIFM1.

== Clinical significance ==
The Hsp70 member proteins are important apoptotic constituents. During a normal embryologic processes, or during cell injury (such as ischemia-reperfusion injury during heart attacks and strokes) or during developments and processes in cancer, an apoptotic cell undergoes structural changes including cell shrinkage, plasma membrane blebbing, nuclear condensation, and fragmentation of the DNA and nucleus. This is followed by fragmentation into apoptotic bodies that are quickly removed by phagocytes, thereby preventing an inflammatory response. It is a mode of cell death defined by characteristic morphological, biochemical and molecular changes. It was first described as a "shrinkage necrosis", and then this term was replaced by apoptosis to emphasize its role opposite mitosis in tissue kinetics. In later stages of apoptosis the entire cell becomes fragmented, forming a number of plasma membrane-bounded apoptotic bodies which contain nuclear and or cytoplasmic elements. The ultrastructural appearance of necrosis is quite different, the main features being mitochondrial swelling, plasma membrane breakdown and cellular disintegration. Apoptosis occurs in many physiological and pathological processes. It plays an important role during embryonal development as programmed cell death and accompanies a variety of normal involutional processes in which it serves as a mechanism to remove "unwanted" cells.

Hsp70 member proteins, including Hsp72, inhibit apoptosis by acting on the caspase-dependent pathway and against apoptosis-inducing agents such as tumor necrosis factor-α (TNFα), staurosporine, and doxorubicin. This role leads to its involvement in many pathological processes, such as oncogenesis, neurodegeneration, and senescence. In particular, overexpression of HSP72 has been linked to the development some cancers, such as hepatocellular carcinoma, gastric cancers, colon cancers, breast cancers, and lung cancers, which led to its use as a prognostic marker for these cancers. Elevated Hsp70 levels in tumor cells may increase malignancy and resistance to therapy by complexing, and hence, stabilizing, oncofetal proteins and products and transporting them into intracellular sites, thereby promoting tumor cell proliferation. As a result, tumor vaccine strategies for Hsp70s have been highly successful in animal models and progressed to clinical trials. One treatment, a Hsp72/AFP recombined vaccine, elicited robust protective immunity against AFP-expressing tumors in mice experiments. Therefore, the vaccine holds promise for treating hepatocellular carcinoma. Alternatively, overexpression of Hsp70 can mitigate damage from ischemia-reperfusion in cardiac muscle, as well damage from neurodegenerative diseases, such as Alzheimer's disease, Parkinson's disease, Huntington's disease, and spinocerebellar ataxias, and aging and cell senescence, as observed in centenarians subjected to heat shock challenge.

In Diabetes mellitus type 2 (T2DM), a small molecule activator of Hsp72 named BGP-15 has been shown to improve insulin sensitivity and inflammation in an insulin-resistant mouse model, increase mitochondrial volume, and improve metabolic homeostasis in a rat model of T2DM. BGP-15 has now proceeded to Phase 2b clinical trials and demonstrated no side-effects thus far. Though early speculation considered that Hsp72 expression might be affecting insulin sensitivity through a direct interaction with GLUT4, studies were unable to verify this link. Experiments did reveal that Hsp72 improved insulin sensitivity through stimulating glucose uptake during a hyperinsulemic-euglycemic clamp in T2DM patients. Additionally, Hsp72 has been associated with another inflammatory condition, rheumatoid arthritis, and could be implemented to help diagnose and monitor disease activity in patients.

== Interactions ==
HSPA1A has been shown to interact with:

- XIAP,
- Apaf-1,
- AIFM1,
- ASK1,
- BAG3,
- Casein kinase 2,
- FANCC,
- GPR37,
- HSF1,
- MSR1,
- PARK2,
- PARP1,
- STUB1, and
- XRCC1.

== See also ==
- Heat shock proteins
- Hsp70
