= XAGE1B =

Protein-coding gene in humans

Identifiers
- Aliases: XAGE1B, CT12.1, CT12.1C, CT12.1D, CT12.1E, CTP9, GAGED2, XAGE-1, XAGE1, XAGE1C, XAGE1D, X antigen family member 1E, X antigen family member 1B, XAGE1E, CT12.1b
- External IDs: OMIM: 300289, 300744, 300745; GeneCards: XAGE1B

Gene location (Human)
Chr.	X chromosome (human)
Band	Xp11.22	Start	52,512,077 bp
Band	Xp11.22	End	52,520,803 bp
RNA expression pattern
Bgee	Human / Mouse (ortholog); Top expressed in: testicle; gonad; right testis; left testis; upper lobe of left lung; tonsil; monocyte; right lung; apex of heart; lymph node / n/a; More reference expression data
BioGPS	n/a
Orthologs
Databases	NCBI: entry; OMA: entry
Species	Human	Mouse
Entrez	653067	n/a
Ensembl	ENSG00000204382	n/a
UniProt	Q9HD64	n/a
RefSeq (mRNA)	NM_001097597; NM_001097598; NM_001097602; NM_001097603; NM_001097604 NM_001097605; NM_020411; NM_133430; NM_133431	n/a
RefSeq (protein)	NP_001091073; NP_001091074; NP_065144	n/a
Location (UCSC)	Chr X: 52.51 – 52.52 Mb	n/a
PubMed search		n/a
- Wikidata
View/Edit Human

X antigen family member 1B (also somewhat ambiguously called XAGE-1) is a protein that in humans is encoded by the XAGE1B gene. The XAGE1B gene encodes a protein which is typically identical to the protein encoded by its paralog, XAGE1A. This shared protein is often referred to as XAGE-1, when not specifying the origin gene.

This gene is a member of the XAGE subfamily, which belongs to the GAGE family. The GAGE genes are expressed in a variety of tumors and in some fetal and reproductive tissues. This gene is strongly expressed in Ewing's sarcoma, alveolar rhabdomyosarcoma and normal testis. The protein encoded by this gene contains a nuclear localization signal and shares a sequence similarity with other GAGE/PAGE proteins. Because of the expression pattern and the sequence similarity, this protein also belongs to a family of CT (cancer-testis) antigens. Alternative splicing of this gene generates 3 transcript variants, and one of which includes 2 transcripts generated from alternate transcription initiation sites.
