= AIFM1 =

Protein-coding gene in humans

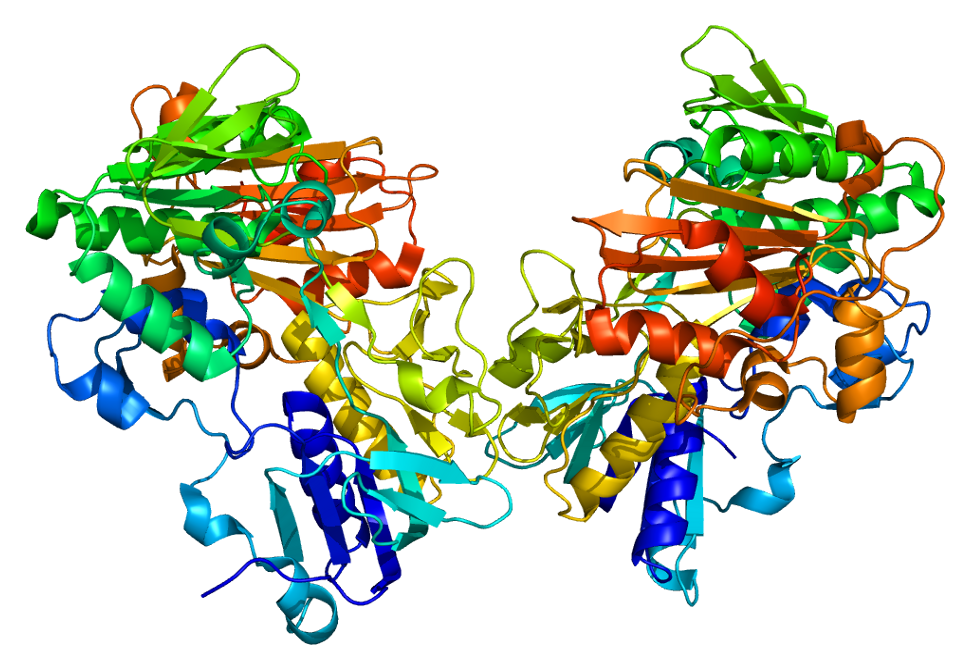

Identifiers
- Aliases: AIFM1, AIF, CMT2D, CMTX4, COWCK, COXPD6, NADMR, NAMSD, PDCD8, DFNX5, apoptosis inducing factor, mitochondria associated 1, apoptosis inducing factor mitochondria associated 1, AUNX1, SEMDHL
- External IDs: OMIM: 300169; MGI: 1349419; GeneCards: AIFM1
Available structures
PDB	Ortholog search: PDBe RCSB
PDB	List of PDB id codes 1M6I, 4BUR, 4BV6, 4FDC, 4LII, 5FS7, 5FS9, 5FS6, 5FS8

Gene location (Human)
Chr.	X chromosome (human)
Band	Xq26.1	Start	130,124,666 bp
Band	Xq26.1	End	130,165,879 bp

Gene location (Mouse)
Chr.	X chromosome (mouse)
Band	X A5|X 25.68 cM	Start	47,563,821 bp
Band	X A5|X 25.68 cM	End	47,602,440 bp
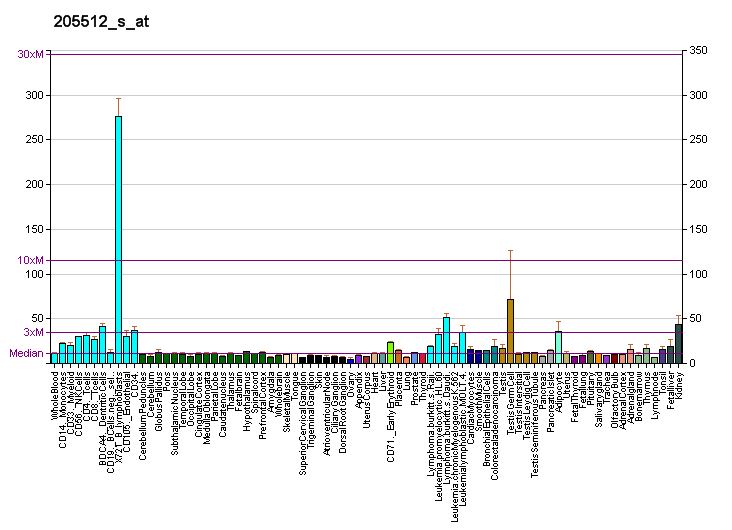
RNA expression pattern
Bgee	Human / Mouse (ortholog); Top expressed in: apex of heart; human kidney; left ventricle; right adrenal cortex; mucosa of transverse colon; right lobe of liver; right auricle of heart; left adrenal gland; left adrenal cortex; myocardium of left ventricle / Top expressed in: Ileal epithelium; interventricular septum; cardiac muscle tissue of left ventricle; choroid plexus; choroid plexus of fourth ventricle; Epithelium of choroid plexus; right kidney; human kidney; proximal tubule; soleus muscle; More reference expression data
BioGPS	More reference expression data
Gene ontology
Molecular function	protein binding; protein dimerization activity; oxidoreductase activity; flavin adenine dinucleotide binding; NAD(P)H oxidase H2O2-forming activity; FAD binding; oxidoreductase activity, acting on NAD(P)H; DNA binding
Cellular component	mitochondrial inner membrane; cytoplasm; cytosol; membrane; perinuclear region of cytoplasm; mitochondrial intermembrane space; mitochondrion; nucleus
Biological process	neuron apoptotic process; response to ischemia; chromosome condensation; cellular response to oxygen-glucose deprivation; activation of cysteine-type endopeptidase activity involved in apoptotic process; positive regulation of neuron apoptotic process; regulation of apoptotic DNA fragmentation; cellular response to hydrogen peroxide; intrinsic apoptotic signaling pathway in response to endoplasmic reticulum stress; positive regulation of apoptotic process; cellular response to nitric oxide; response to L-glutamate; positive regulation of cell death; mitochondrial respiratory chain complex I assembly; response to toxic substance; cellular response to estradiol stimulus; neuron differentiation; cellular response to aldosterone; apoptotic process
Sources:Amigo / QuickGO
Orthologs
Databases	NCBI: entry; OMA: entry
Species	Human	Mouse
Entrez	9131	26926
Ensembl	ENSG00000156709	ENSMUSG00000036932
UniProt	O95831	Q9Z0X1
RefSeq (mRNA)	NM_001130846; NM_001130847; NM_004208; NM_145812; NM_145813	NM_001290364; NM_012019
RefSeq (protein)	NP_001124318; NP_001124319; NP_004199; NP_665811	NP_001277293; NP_036149
Location (UCSC)	Chr X: 130.12 – 130.17 Mb	Chr X: 47.56 – 47.6 Mb
PubMed search
- Wikidata
View/Edit Human	View/Edit Mouse

Apoptosis-inducing factor 1, mitochondrial is a protein that in humans is encoded by the AIFM1 gene on the X chromosome. This protein localizes to the mitochondria, as well as the nucleus, where it carries out nuclear fragmentation as part of caspase-independent apoptosis.

== Structure ==
AIFM1 is expressed as a 613-residue precursor protein that containing a mitochondrial targeting sequence (MTS) at its N-terminal and two nuclear leading sequences (NLS). Once imported into the mitochondria, the first 54 residues of the N-terminal are cleaved to produce the mature protein, which inserts into the inner mitochondrial membrane. The mature protein incorporates the FAD cofactor and folds into three structural domains: the FAD-binding domain, the NAD-binding domain, and the C-terminal. While the C-terminal is responsible for the proapoptotic activity of AIFM1, the FAD-binding and NAD-binding domains share the classical Rossmann topology with other flavoproteins and the NAD(P)H dependent reductase activity.

Three alternative transcripts encoding different isoforms have been identified for this gene. Two alternatively spliced mRNA isoforms correspond to the inclusion/exclusion of the C-terminal and the reductase domains. A pseudogene that is thought to be related to this gene has been identified on chromosome 10.

== Function ==
This gene encodes a flavoprotein essential for nuclear disassembly in apoptotic cells that is found in the mitochondrial intermembrane space in healthy cells. Induction of apoptosis results in the cleavage of this protein at residue 102 by calpains and/or cathepsins into a soluble and proapoptogenic form that translocates to the nucleus, where it affects chromosome condensation and fragmentation. In addition, this gene product induces mitochondria to release the apoptogenic proteins cytochrome c and caspase-9. AIFM1 also contributes reductase activity in redox metabolism.

== Clinical significance ==
Mutations in the AIFM1 gene are correlated with Charcot-Marie-Tooth disease (Cowchock syndrome). At a cellular level, AIFM1 mutations result in deficiencies in oxidative phosphorylation, leading to severe mitochondrial encephalomyopathy. Clinical manifestations of this mutation are characterized by muscular atrophy, neuropathy, ataxia, psychomotor regression, hearing loss and seizures.

== Interactions ==
AIFM1 has been shown to interact with HSPA1A.

== Evolution ==
Phylogenetic analysis indicates that the divergence of the AIFM1 and other human AIFs (AIFM2a and AIFM3) sequences occurred before the divergence of eukaryotes. This conclusion is supported by domain architecture of these proteins. Both eukaryotic and eubacterial AIFM1 proteins contain additional domain AIF_C.
