= GPRASP2 =

Protein-coding gene in humans

Identifiers
- Aliases: GPRASP2, GASP2, G protein-coupled receptor associated sorting protein 2, DFNX7
- External IDs: OMIM: 300969; MGI: 2442071; GeneCards: GPRASP2

Gene location (Human)
Chr.	X chromosome (human)
Band	Xq22.1	Start	102,712,445 bp
Band	Xq22.1	End	102,717,733 bp

Gene location (Mouse)
Chr.	X chromosome (mouse)
Band	X F1|X 57.3 cM	Start	134,739,783 bp
Band	X F1|X 57.3 cM	End	134,745,479 bp
RNA expression pattern
Bgee	Human / Mouse (ortholog); Top expressed in: endothelial cell; Brodmann area 23; middle temporal gyrus; pons; postcentral gyrus; superior vestibular nucleus; cardiac muscle tissue of right atrium; entorhinal cortex; lateral nuclear group of thalamus; superior frontal gyrus / Top expressed in: dorsomedial hypothalamic nucleus; paraventricular nucleus of hypothalamus; arcuate nucleus; ventromedial nucleus; median eminence; lateral hypothalamus; suprachiasmatic nucleus; ventral tegmental area; dorsal tegmental nucleus; central gray substance of midbrain; More reference expression data
BioGPS	n/a
Orthologs
Databases	NCBI: entry; OMA: entry
Species	Human	Mouse
Entrez	114928	245607
Ensembl	ENSG00000158301	ENSMUSG00000072966
UniProt	Q96D09	Q8BUY8
RefSeq (mRNA)	NM_138437; NM_001004051; NM_001184874; NM_001184875; NM_001184876	NM_001163015; NM_001163016; NM_001163017; NM_001359371
RefSeq (protein)	NP_001186747; NP_001337197; NP_001337198; NP_001337199; NP_001004051 NP_001171803; NP_001171804; NP_001171805; NP_612446	NP_001156487; NP_001156488; NP_001156489; NP_001346300
Location (UCSC)	Chr X: 102.71 – 102.72 Mb	Chr X: 134.74 – 134.75 Mb
PubMed search
- Wikidata
View/Edit Human	View/Edit Mouse

G-protein coupled receptor-associated sorting protein 2 is a protein that in humans is encoded by the GPRASP2 gene.
