= ARMCX1 =

Protein-coding gene in humans

Identifiers
- Aliases: ARMCX1, ALEX1, GASP7, armadillo repeat containing, X-linked 1, armadillo repeat containing X-linked 1
- External IDs: OMIM: 300362; MGI: 1925498; GeneCards: ARMCX1

Gene location (Human)
Chr.	X chromosome (human)
Band	Xq22.1	Start	101,550,547 bp
Band	Xq22.1	End	101,554,700 bp

Gene location (Mouse)
Chr.	X chromosome (mouse)
Band	X|X E3	Start	133,618,712 bp
Band	X|X E3	End	133,622,666 bp
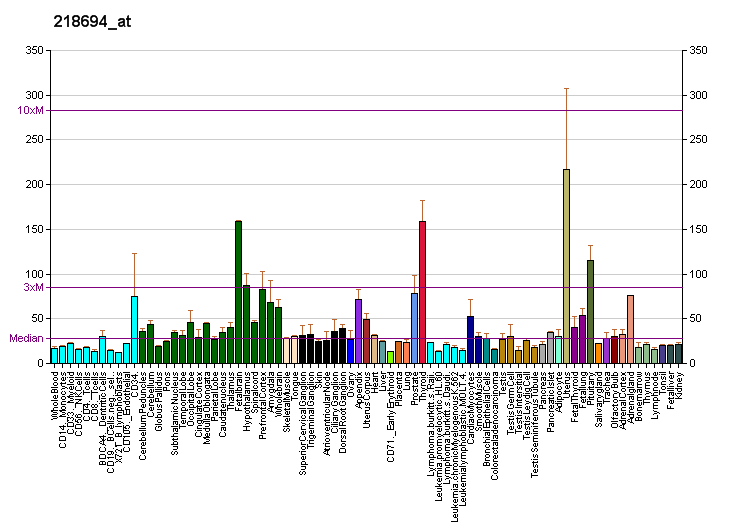
RNA expression pattern
Bgee	Human / Mouse (ortholog); Top expressed in: germinal epithelium; Epithelium of choroid plexus; parietal pleura; Brodmann area 23; right ventricle; cartilage tissue; visceral pleura; tail of epididymis; Skeletal muscle tissue of rectus abdominis; glomerulus / Top expressed in: superior cervical ganglion; pontine nuclei; facial motor nucleus; ventral tegmental area; habenula; dorsomedial hypothalamic nucleus; medial dorsal nucleus; inferior colliculi; barrel cortex; medial vestibular nucleus; More reference expression data
BioGPS	More reference expression data
Orthologs
Databases	NCBI: entry; OMA: entry
Species	Human	Mouse
Entrez	51309	78248
Ensembl	ENSG00000126947	ENSMUSG00000033460
UniProt	Q9P291	Q9CX83
RefSeq (mRNA)	NM_016608	NM_001166377; NM_001166378; NM_001166379; NM_001166380; NM_030066
RefSeq (protein)	NP_057692	NP_001159849; NP_001159850; NP_001159851; NP_001159852; NP_084342
Location (UCSC)	Chr X: 101.55 – 101.55 Mb	Chr X: 133.62 – 133.62 Mb
PubMed search
- Wikidata
View/Edit Human	View/Edit Mouse

Armadillo repeat-containing X-linked protein 1 is a protein that in humans is encoded by the ARMCX1 gene.

This gene encodes a member of the ALEX family of proteins and may play a role in tumor suppression. The encoded protein contains a potential N-terminal transmembrane domain and two Armadillo repeats. Other proteins containing the arm repeat are involved in development, maintenance of tissue integrity, and tumorigenesis. This gene is closely localized with other family members, including ALEX2 and ALEX3, on the X chromosome.
