= TRAK1 =

Protein-coding gene in the species Homo sapiens

Identifiers
- Aliases: TRAK1, MILT1, OIP106, trafficking kinesin protein 1, EIEE68, DEE68
- External IDs: OMIM: 608112; MGI: 1914345; GeneCards: TRAK1

Gene location (Human)
Chr.	Chromosome 3 (human)
Band	3p22.1	Start	42,013,802 bp
Band	3p22.1	End	42,225,890 bp

Gene location (Mouse)
Chr.	Chromosome 9 (mouse)
Band	9 F4|9 72.41 cM	Start	121,126,568 bp
Band	9 F4|9 72.41 cM	End	121,303,984 bp
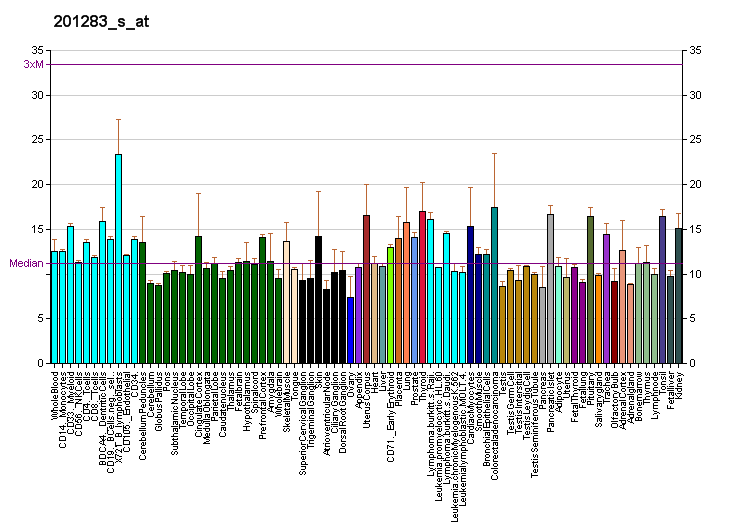

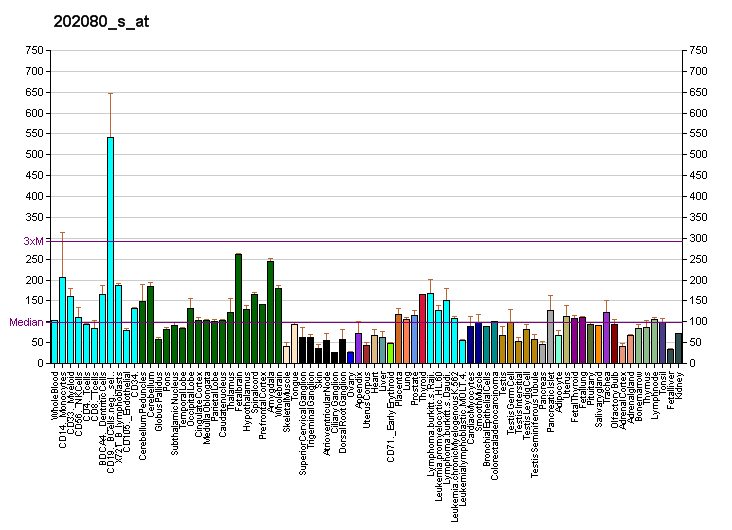

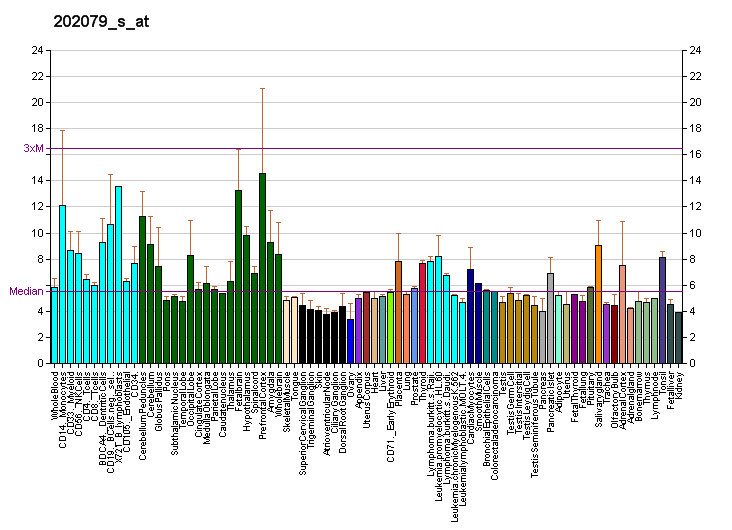
RNA expression pattern
Bgee	Human / Mouse (ortholog); Top expressed in: secondary oocyte; paraflocculus of cerebellum; muscle of thigh; epithelium of bronchus; pylorus; bronchial epithelial cell; right auricle of heart; epithelium of nasopharynx; nipple; frontal pole / Top expressed in: aortic valve; ascending aorta; muscle of thigh; myocardium of ventricle; superior frontal gyrus; zygote; ankle joint; dentate gyrus of hippocampal formation granule cell; stria vascularis; lip; More reference expression data
BioGPS	More reference expression data
Gene ontology
Molecular function	protein binding; GABA receptor binding; TPR domain binding; signaling receptor binding; myosin binding
Cellular component	cytoplasm; endosome; early endosome; mitochondrion; nucleus; axon cytoplasm; dendrite; axonal growth cone; perinuclear region of cytoplasm; cytoplasmic vesicle; dendrite cytoplasm; cell cortex; membrane; mitochondrial membranes
Biological process	regulation of transcription by RNA polymerase II; protein targeting; protein O-linked glycosylation; endosome to lysosome transport; anterograde axonal transport of mitochondrion; axonal transport of mitochondrion; dendrite morphogenesis; positive regulation of axonogenesis; anterograde axonal transport; protein localization; neurogenesis; vesicle transport along microtubule; mitochondrion distribution
Sources:Amigo / QuickGO
Orthologs
Databases	NCBI: entry; OMA: entry
Species	Human	Mouse
Entrez	22906	67095
Ensembl	ENSG00000182606	ENSMUSG00000032536
UniProt	Q9UPV9	Q6PD31
RefSeq (mRNA)	NM_001042646; NM_001265608; NM_001265609; NM_001265610; NM_014965 NM_001349245; NM_001349246; NM_001349247; NM_001349248; NM_001349249	NM_175114; NM_001357968; NM_001357969; NM_001357970; NM_001357972 NM_001357973
RefSeq (protein)	NP_001036111; NP_001252537; NP_001252538; NP_001252539; NP_055780 NP_001336174; NP_001336175; NP_001336176; NP_001336177; NP_001336178	NP_780323; NP_001344897; NP_001344898; NP_001344899; NP_001344901 NP_001344902
Location (UCSC)	Chr 3: 42.01 – 42.23 Mb	Chr 9: 121.13 – 121.3 Mb
PubMed search
- Wikidata
View/Edit Human	View/Edit Mouse

Trafficking kinesin-binding protein 1 is a protein that in humans is encoded by the TRAK1 gene.
