= TRAK2 =

Protein-coding gene in the species Homo sapiens

Identifiers
- Aliases: TRAK2, ALS2CR3, CALS-C, GRIF-1, GRIF1, MILT2, OIP98, trafficking kinesin protein 2
- External IDs: OMIM: 607334; MGI: 1918077; HomoloGene: 22861; GeneCards: TRAK2; OMA:TRAK2 - orthologs

Gene location (Human)
Chr.	Chromosome 2 (human)
Band	2q33.1	Start	201,377,207 bp
Band	2q33.1	End	201,451,500 bp

Gene location (Mouse)
Chr.	Chromosome 1 (mouse)
Band	1|1 C1.3	Start	58,900,449 bp
Band	1|1 C1.3	End	58,973,430 bp
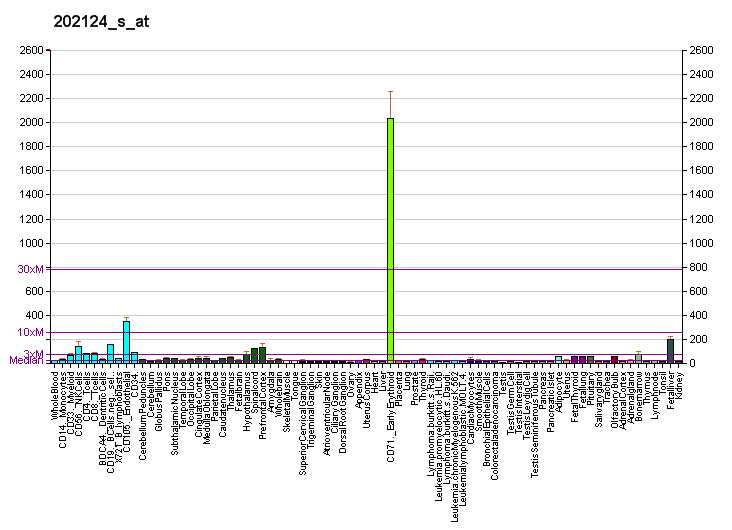

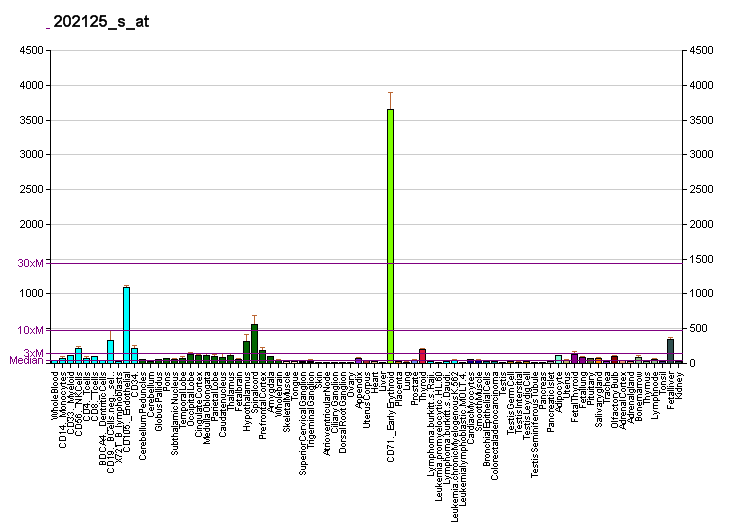
RNA expression pattern
Bgee	Human / Mouse (ortholog); Top expressed in: dorsal motor nucleus of vagus nerve; optic nerve; trabecular bone; tendon of biceps brachii; Epithelium of choroid plexus; inferior olivary nucleus; C1 segment; inferior ganglion of vagus nerve; right ventricle; subthalamic nucleus / Top expressed in: globus pallidus; otolith organ; digastric muscle; utricle; bone marrow; soleus muscle; vastus lateralis muscle; lumbar subsegment of spinal cord; superior cervical ganglion; temporal muscle; More reference expression data
BioGPS	More reference expression data
Gene ontology
Molecular function	signaling receptor binding; protein binding; GABA receptor binding; kinesin binding; TPR domain binding; enzyme binding; myosin binding
Cellular component	cytoplasm; endosome; plasma membrane; early endosome; mitochondrion; nucleus; dendrite cytoplasm; dendrite; neuron projection; soma; axonal growth cone; cytoplasmic vesicle; axon cytoplasm
Biological process	regulation of transcription by RNA polymerase II; protein targeting; protein O-linked glycosylation; anterograde dendritic transport of mitochondrion; endosome to lysosome transport; dendrite morphogenesis; negative regulation of axonogenesis; dendritic transport of mitochondrion; anterograde axonal transport; protein localization; neurogenesis; vesicle transport along microtubule; mitochondrion distribution; anterograde axonal transport of mitochondrion
Sources:Amigo / QuickGO
Orthologs
Species	Human	Mouse
Entrez	66008	70827
Ensembl	ENSG00000115993	ENSMUSG00000026028
UniProt	O60296	n/a
RefSeq (mRNA)	NM_015049	NM_172406
RefSeq (protein)	NP_055864	n/a
Location (UCSC)	Chr 2: 201.38 – 201.45 Mb	Chr 1: 58.9 – 58.97 Mb
PubMed search
- Wikidata
View/Edit Human	View/Edit Mouse

Trafficking kinesin-binding protein 2 is a protein that in humans is encoded by the TRAK2 gene.

== Interactions ==
TRAK2 has been shown to interact with Kir2.1 and GABRB2.
