= ARMCX3 =

Protein-coding gene in humans

Identifiers
- Aliases: ARMCX3, ALEX3, GASP6, dJ545K15.2, armadillo repeat containing, X-linked 3, armadillo repeat containing X-linked 3
- External IDs: OMIM: 300364; MGI: 1918953; HomoloGene: 9588; GeneCards: ARMCX3; OMA:ARMCX3 - orthologs

Gene location (Human)
| Chr. | X chromosome (human) |
| Band | Xq22.1 | Start | 101,622,797 bp |
| Band | Xq22.1 | End | 101,627,843 bp |

Gene location (Mouse)
| Chr. | X chromosome (mouse) |
| Band | X|X E3 | Start | 133,657,344 bp |
| Band | X|X E3 | End | 133,662,204 bp |
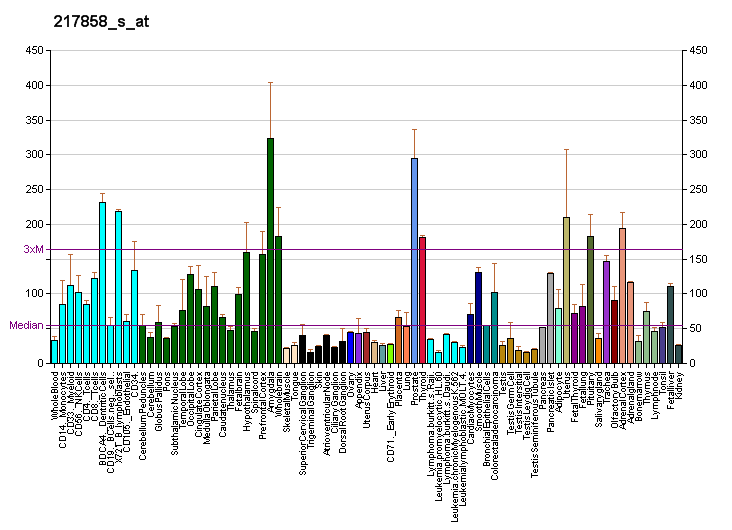
RNA expression pattern
| Bgee | Human / Mouse (ortholog); Top expressed in: lateral nuclear group of thalamus; pars compacta; external globus pallidus; spinal ganglia; pars reticulata; corpus epididymis; pons; cardia; superior vestibular nucleus; pylorus / Top expressed in: dentate gyrus of hippocampal formation granule cell; ovary; hippocampus proper; neural tube; pancreas; primary visual cortex; superior frontal gyrus; islet of Langerhans; cerebellar cortex; mesencephalon; More reference expression data |
| BioGPS | More reference expression data |
Orthologs
| Species | Human | Mouse |
| Entrez | 51566 | 71703 |
| Ensembl | ENSG00000102401 | ENSMUSG00000049047 |
| UniProt | Q9UH62 | Q8BHS6 |
| RefSeq (mRNA) | NM_016607; NM_177947; NM_177948 | NM_027870; NM_001358520; NM_001358521 |
| RefSeq (protein) | NP_057691; NP_808816; NP_808817; NP_057691.1; NP_808816.1 NP_808817.1 | NP_082146; NP_001345449; NP_001345450 |
| Location (UCSC) | Chr X: 101.62 – 101.63 Mb | Chr X: 133.66 – 133.66 Mb |
| PubMed search |
- Wikidata
| View/Edit Human | View/Edit Mouse |

Armadillo repeat-containing X-linked protein 3 is a protein that in humans is encoded by the ARMCX3 gene.

This gene encodes a member of the ALEX family of proteins which may play a role in tumor suppression. The encoded protein contains a potential N-terminal transmembrane domain and a single Armadillo repeat. Other proteins containing the arm repeat are involved in development, maintenance of tissue integrity, and tumorigenesis. This gene is closely localized with other family members on the X chromosome. Three transcript variants encoding the same protein have been identified for this gene.
