= TMEM202 =

Identifiers
- Aliases: TMEM202, transmembrane protein 202
- External IDs: MGI: 1921143; HomoloGene: 52264; GeneCards: TMEM202; OMA:TMEM202 - orthologs

Gene location (Human)
Chr.	Chromosome 15 (human)
Band	15q23-q24.1	Start	72,398,302 bp
Band	15q23-q24.1	End	72,408,367 bp

Gene location (Mouse)
Chr.	Chromosome 9 (mouse)
Band	9|9 B	Start	59,425,968 bp
Band	9|9 B	End	59,447,130 bp
RNA expression pattern
Bgee	Human / Mouse (ortholog); Top expressed in: testicle; left testis; right testis; gonad; muscle of thigh; cell; monocyte; ectocervix; placenta; blood / Top expressed in: spermatid; spermatocyte; seminiferous tubule; granulocyte; decidua; embryo; embryo; dentate gyrus of hippocampal formation granule cell; facial motor nucleus; blastocyst; More reference expression data
BioGPS	n/a
Orthologs
Species	Human	Mouse
Entrez	338949	73893
Ensembl	ENSG00000187806	ENSMUSG00000049526
UniProt	A6NGA9	Q80W35
RefSeq (mRNA)	NM_001080462	NM_178388
RefSeq (protein)	NP_001073931	NP_848475
Location (UCSC)	Chr 15: 72.4 – 72.41 Mb	Chr 9: 59.43 – 59.45 Mb
PubMed search
- Wikidata
View/Edit Human	View/Edit Mouse

Transmembrane Protein 202
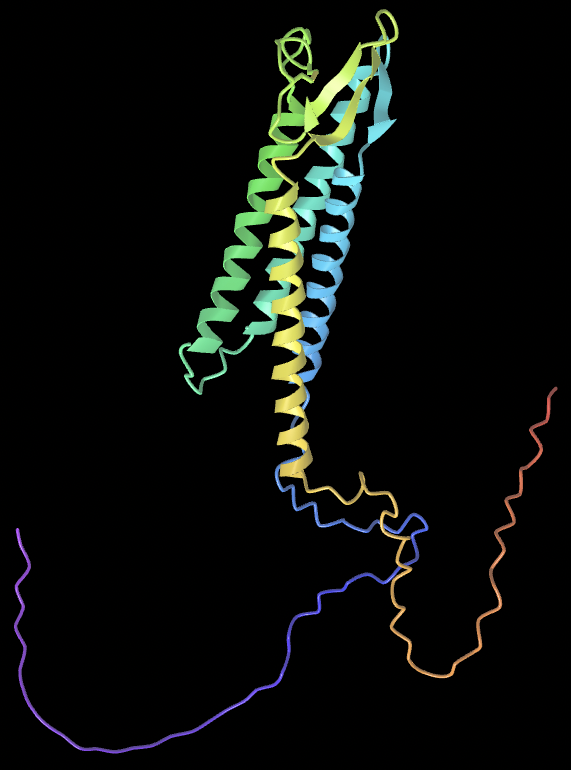

Identifiers
- Symbol: TMEM202
- Alt. names: FLJ27523
- RefSeq: NP_001073931
- UniProt: A6NGA9
Search for
- Structures: Swiss-model
- Domains: InterPro

Transmembrane 202 protein (Homo sapiens, TMEM202) is encoded by the gene TMEM202 and is a member of the Claudin2 superfamily. Human paralogs include LIMP2, GSG1, CLDND2, NKG7. The specific function of TMEM202 has largely yet to be elucidated, but other Claudin2 superfamily proteins plays important roles in paracellular transport by contributing to the structure of gap junctions. In S. scrofa (wild boar), TMEM202 has been found to aid in sperm motility, fertilization, and spermatogenesis.

== Gene ==
=== Location ===
The TMEM202 gene spans 10,063 nucleotides on chromosome 15 located at 15q23-q24.1 and on the forward strand. The most complete isoform of TMEM202 (transcript variant 1) contains five exons. The genetic neighborhood is rather scarce, as HEXA is the gene nearest to TMEM202 and is found ~23,000 nucleotides upstream.

=== Expression ===
TMEM202 demonstrates restricted and low expression in H. sapiens testis.

== RNA and Transcriptional variants ==
There exist four transcriptional variants of TMEM202 mRNA.

Properties of TMEM202 mRNA Transcript Variants.
TMEM202 Transcript Variant	Accession Number	mRNA length (nucleotides)	5'UTR length (nucleotides)	Exon 1	Exon 2	Exon 3	Exon 4	Exon 5
Transcript variant 1	NM_001080462	1318	22	Y	Y	Y	Y	Y
Isoform X1	XM_011521497	1326	147	X	*	Y	Y	Y
Isoform X2	XM_024449910	1186	22	Y	Y	Y	X	Y
Isoform X3	XM_011521499	1132	169	X	X	Y	Y	Y

'Y' indicates the presence of the exon in the specific transcript variant, whereas 'X' denotes absence of the exon. '*' represents partial loss of exon two in isoform X1 (first thirty-six nucleotides).

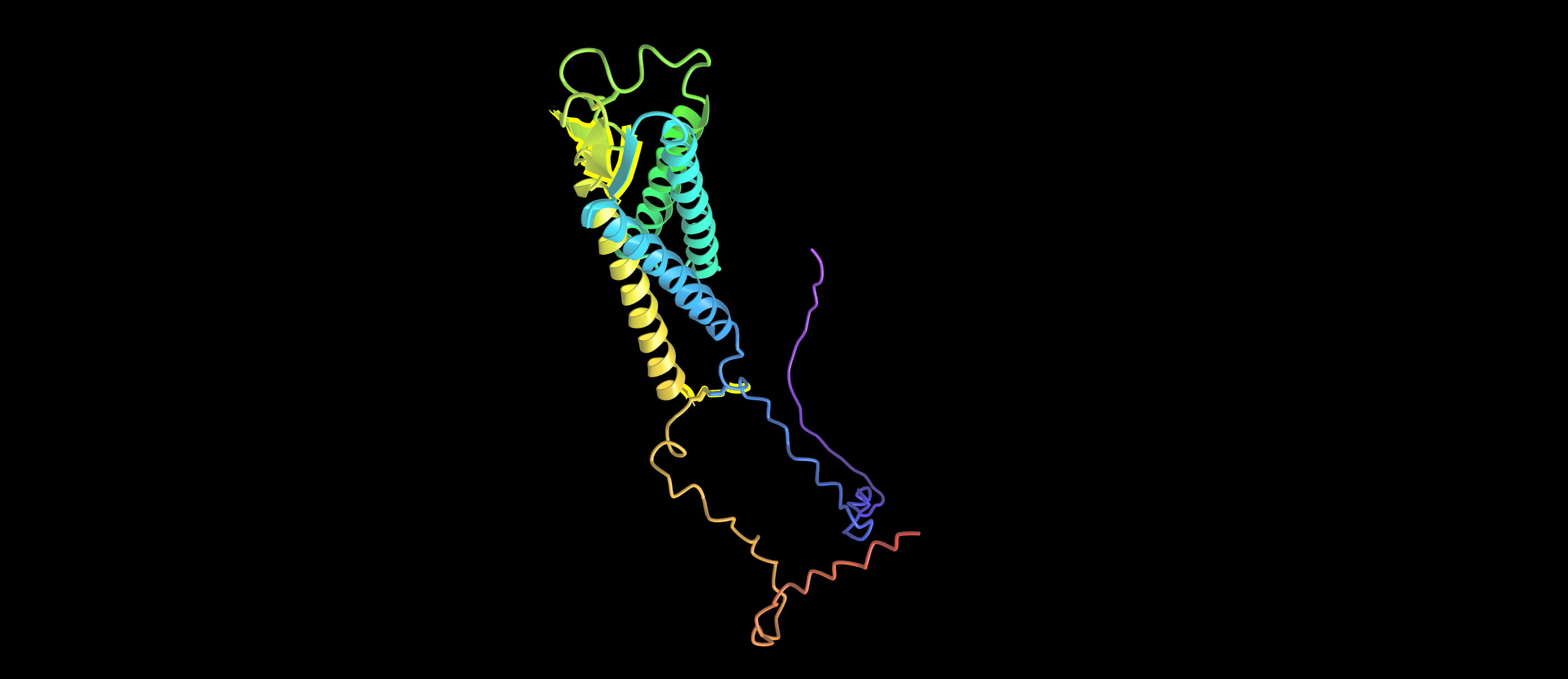
TMEM202 Predicted 3D Structure. The three-dimensional structure shows off the predicted four transmembrane domains, three alpha helices, and one disulfide bond (all highlighted in yellow, except for the transmembrane domains) predicted in TMEM202 tertiary structure.

== TMEM202 protein ==
TMEM202 is classified as a multi-pass protein as it consists of four transmembrane domains with helical structure (residue: 53-75, 121-141, 155-175, and 189-209) and one disordered region (242-273). TMEM202 protein is a member of the Claudin2 superfamily. Claudin proteins often form protein-protein interactions in epithelial and endothelial tissue, contributing to the scaffolding of the tight junction.

Properties of TMEM202 Protein Variants.
TMEM202 Protein Variant	Accession Number	Protein Length (A.A)	Approx. Molecular Weight Prior to PTMs (kDa)	Exons present	Similarity (%)	Internal Composition
TMEM202 Variant 1	NP_001073931.1	273	~31.2	1-5	100	L: (+) W: (+)
TMEM202 Isoform X1	XP_011519799.1	234	~26.8	Part of 2; 3-5	85.7	L: (+) W: (++)
TMEM202 Isoform X2	XP_024305678.1	229	~26.1	1-3, 5	83.9	W: (+) A: (-) D: (-)
TMEM202 Isoform X3	XP_011519801.1	162	~18.5	3-5	58.6	N/A

Similarity was calculated using Pairwise Sequence Alignments (PSAs) where all transcripts were aligned to transcript variant 1. The approximate molecular weight was calculated prior to post-translational modifications (PTMs), such as cleavages in the sequence or binding of additional molecules (e.g., phosphorylation, n-glycosylation). Emboss SAPS was used to determine relative composition of residues as compared to their database of H. sapiens samples. One (+/-) denotes one standard deviation away from the average, whereas two (++/--) indicate two standard deviations away from the average. Proteins with a (+/-) can be classified as rich or poor for that amino acid (e.g., TMEM202 Variant 1 is leucine- and tryptophan-rich).

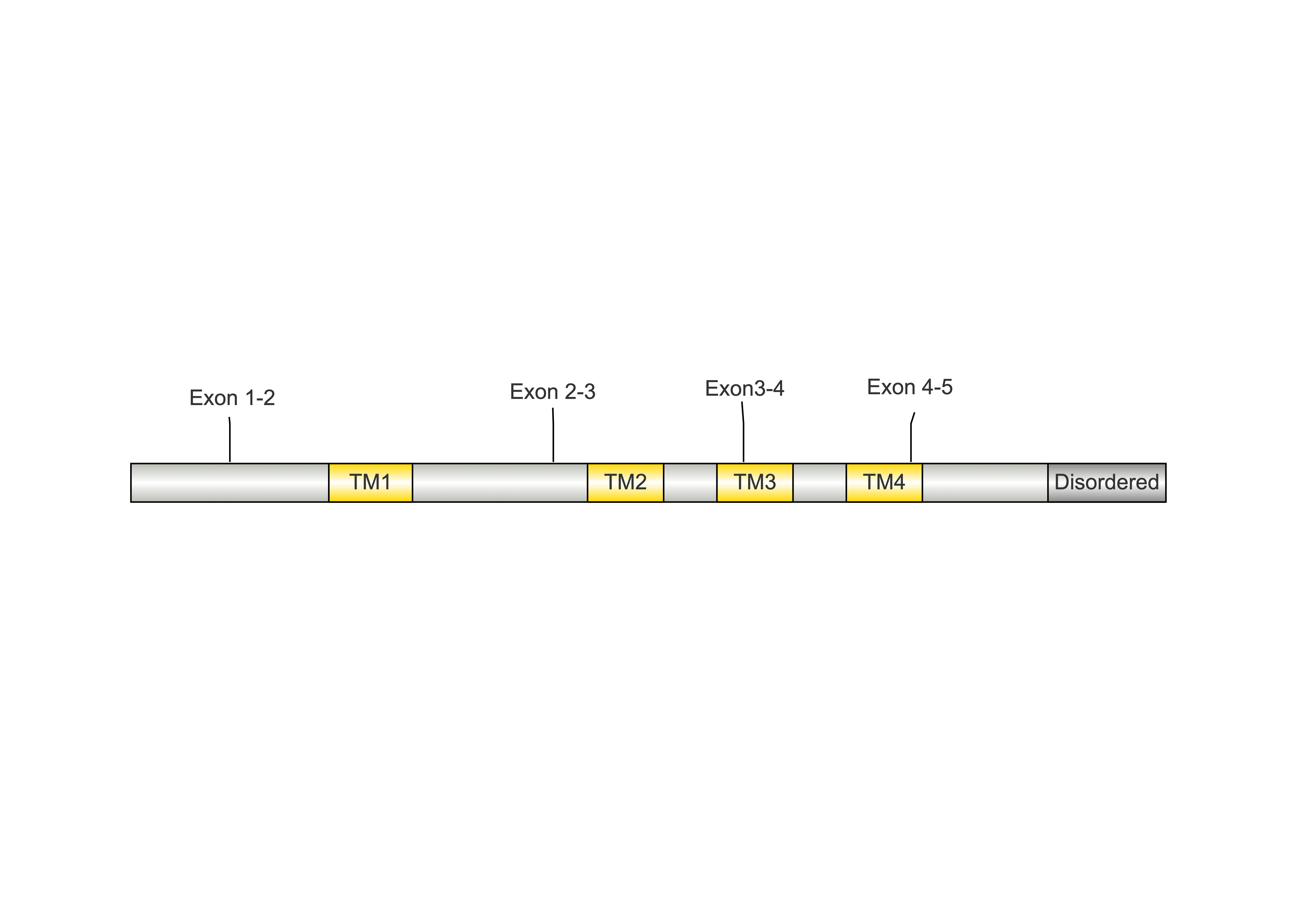
TMEM202 Secondary Domains. A two-dimensional look at important regions of the TMEM202 protein. TM1-4 indicate regions of transmembrane domains, exon X-X indicates the transition between exons of the TMEM202 transcript, and the end of TMEM202 has been classified as disordered. A two-dimensional look at important regions of the TMEM202 protein. TM1-4 indicate regions of transmembrane domains, exon X-X indicates the transition between exons of the TMEM202 transcript, and the end of TMEM202 has been classified as disordered.

=== TMEM202 Secondary Structure ===
The figure to the right, TMEM202 Secondary Domains shows the predicted secondary structure of TMEM202, along with exon boundaries.

== Gene Level Regulation ==
=== Expression pattern ===
The expression of TMEM202 was found to be restricted to the testis during a RNA-sequence study of normal adult human tissue (27 different tissues were analyzed from 95 individual human samples; RPKM = ~5). An additional RNA-seq study of human fetal tissue (six tissue types were sequenced from 35 human fetal samples between 10 and 20 weeks gestational time) found that TMEM202 is present in intestinal, lung, and stomach tissues at week 10 of gestation and in adrenal tissue at week 20.

=== Promoter region and transcription factor binding ===
The figure Annotated Promoter Sequence of Human TMEM202 shows potential binding locations for the most compatible transcription factors. The promoter region was defined as the 500 nucleotides directly upstream of transcription (denoted by a right pointing arrow).

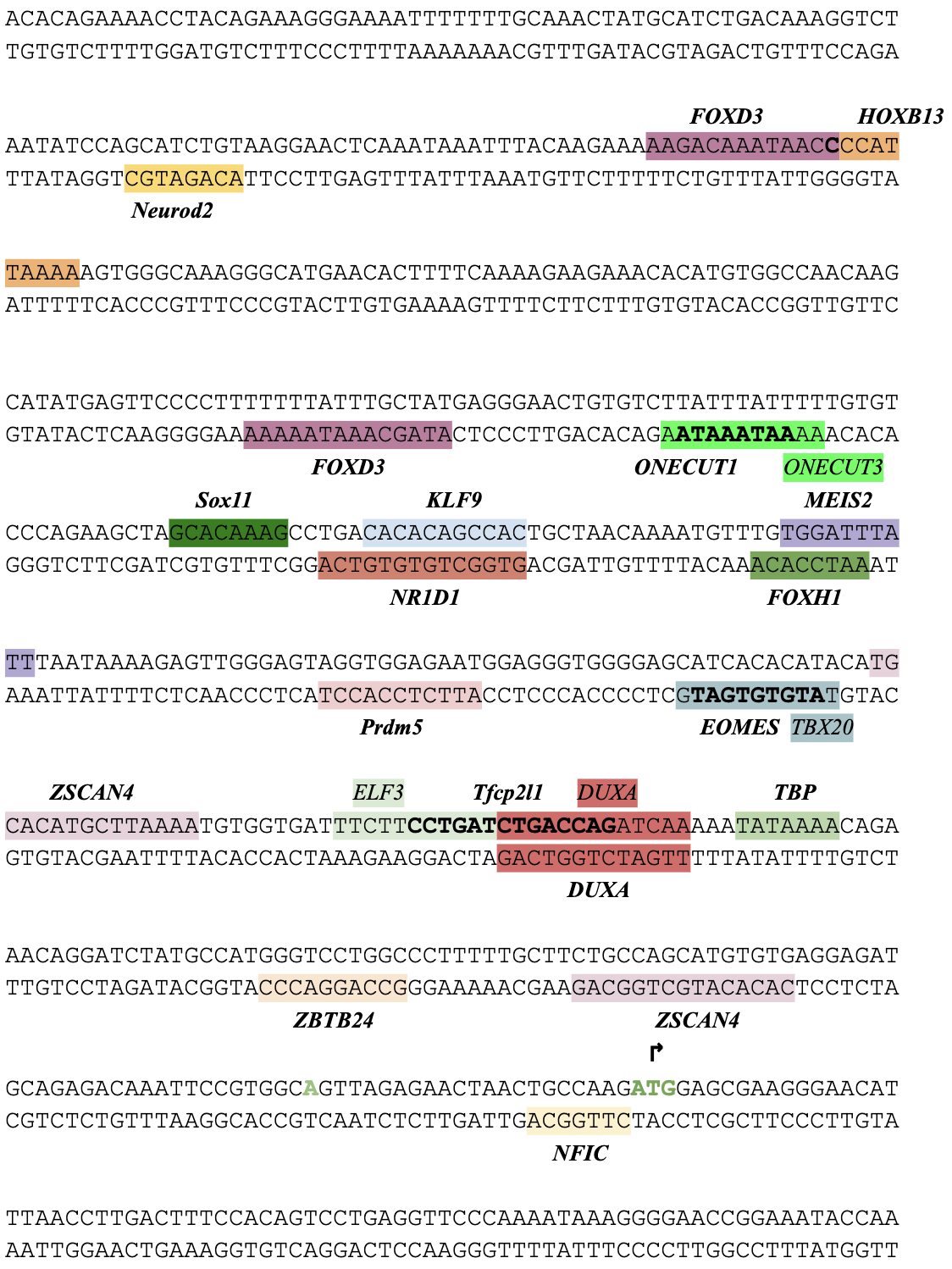
Annotated Promoter Sequence of Human TMEM202. Transcription Factors are labeled in bold text with their abbreviated code name. The start of transcription occurs where the right-pointing arrow sticks out above the green 'ATG'.

TMEM202 Transcription Factors Potentially Binding in Promoter Region.

Transcription Factors Name	Binding Site Location (Bases upstream - Strand)	Binding Score	Function of Transcription Factor	Reason for Identification
NFIC	1 - Minus	421	Individually capable of activating transcription	Function; proximity to start codon; high conservation
ZSCAN4 (Twice)	49 - Minus 134 - Plus	461 609	Regulates embryonic stem cell pluripotency	Function relates to microarray studies; high binding score; appears twice in the promoter region
ZBTB24	75 - Minus	554	Involved in BMP2-induced transcription*	High binding score
TBP	106 - Plus	421	Aids in the initiation of RNA polymerase II-dependent transcription	Function; high conservation
DUXA (Twice)	109 - Plus 109 - Minus	476 476	Acts as a repressor	Function; binding sites on both the plus and minus strand at the same location; overlapping binding sequence with Tfcp2l1; appears twice in the promoter region
Tfcp2l1	115 - Plus	446	Facilitates establishment and maintenance of pluripotency in embryonic stem cells	Function relates to microarray studies; overlapping binding sequence with DUXA, ELF3
ELF3	122 - Plus	400	Acts as an activator	Function; overlapping binding sequence with Tfcp2l1
TBX20	124 - Minus	449	Acts as a transcriptional activator and repressor	Function; overlapping binding sequence with EOMES
EOMES	125 - Minus	418	Acts as transcriptional activator playing a crucial role during development	Function; overlapping binding sequence with TBX20
Prdm5	148 - Minus	427	Acts a transcriptional repressor	Function
MEIS2	178 - Plus	405	Transcriptional regulation - stabilization of the homeoprotein-DNA complex	Function; overlapping binding sequence with FOXH1; moderate coservation
FOXH1	182 - Minus	481	Acts as an activator	Function; overlapping binding sequence with MEIS2; moderate conservation
KLF9	205 - Plus	403	Selectively activates transcription when bound to GC box promoter elements	Function; overlapping binding sequence with NR1D1
NR1D1	205 - Minus	405	Acts a transcriptional repressor	Function; overlapping binding sequence with KLF9
Sox11	221 - Plus	421	Acts as an activator	Function; high coservation
ONECUT3	245 - Minus	508	Acts as an activator	Function; high binding score; overlapping binding sequence with ONECUT1
ONECUT1	247 - Minus	346	Acts as an activator	Function; overlapping binding sequence with ONECUT3; moderate conservation
FOXD3 (Twice)	270 - Minus 364 - Minus	446 467	Acts as a transcriptional activator and repressor	Function; appears twice in the promoter region; overlapping binding sequence with HOXB13; high conservation
HOXB13	355 - Plus	450	Involved in the developmental regulatory system provides cells with positional identities along the anterior-posterior axis	Function; overlapping binding sequence with FOXD3
Neurod2	395 - Minus	403	Involved in neuronal determination	Function

(*) Indicates hypothesized function. A higher binding score suggests a higher likelihood that the transcription factor will bind to the sequence when present—binding scores were calculated by the Jaspar Database. This is a non-exhaustive list of potential transcription factors that may bind to TMEM202, but presents transcription factors with the highest binding score or potentially illuminating qualities within the 500 base promoter region.

== Protein level regulation ==
=== Post-translational modifications ===
Predicted Post-Translational Modifications of TMEM202.

Type of PTM	Number of Sites	Location	Source	Notes
Generic phosphorylation	29	S13, S39, S254	NetPhos	Locations denoted were three highest scored
Phosphorylation	2	**Y25**, **S245**	PhosphoPlus	
GlcNAc O-glycosylation	2	T107, **S245**	DictyOGlyc	
N-myristoylation	2	G61, G145	MyHit	
Acetylation	1	K264	PhosphoPlus	
N-linked glycosylation	1	**N225**	NetNGlyc	
N-linked glycosylation	1	**N225**	ELM	
Arginine and lysine propeptide cleavage sites	None	None	ProP	
C-mannosylation sites	None	None	NetCGlyc	
GPI Anchors	None	None	NetGPI	Likelihood not anchored by GPI - 0.993
O-GalNAc (mucin type) glycosylation sites	None	None	NetOGlyc	

Different types of PTM’s were predicted using a variety of computational systems. Locations bolded were predicted by two or more unique systems.

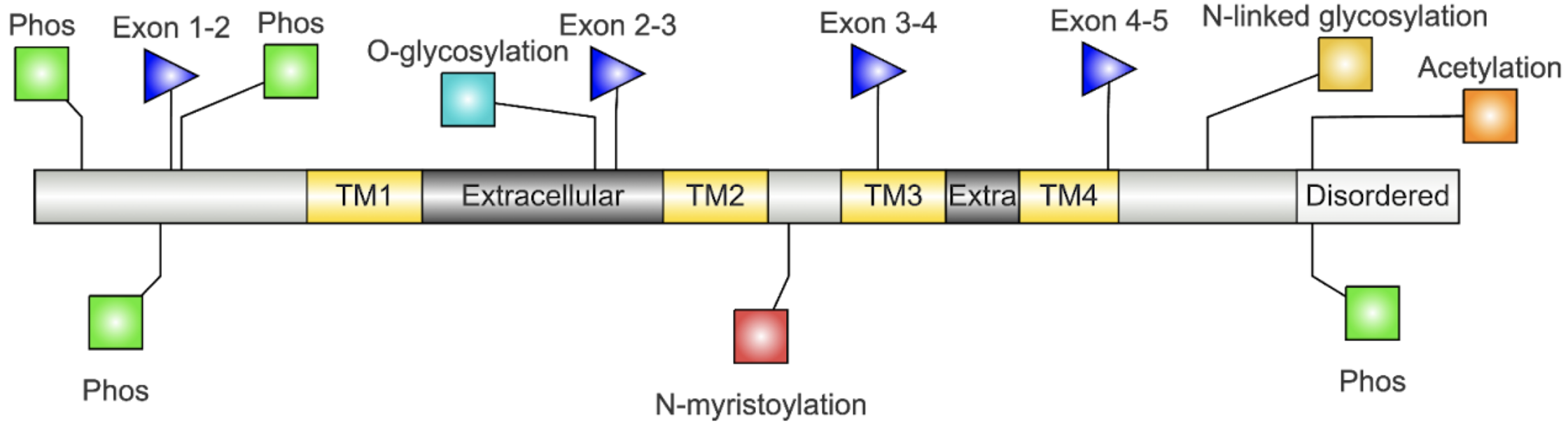
2D Structure of TMEM202 with PTMs. The figure shows where various post-translational modifications are predicted to occur within the context of the primary structure of TMEM202. All regions are intracellular unless labeled TM (transmembrane) or extracellular.

== TMEM202 homology and evolution ==
=== Paralogs of TMEM202 ===
Four paralogs, LIMP2, GSG1, CLDND2, NKG7, have been discovered for TMEM202 and are outlined in the table below.

Paralogs of H. sapiens TMEM202.

TMEM202 Paralogs	Genus and Species	Name	Common Name	Accession Number	Sequence Length (amino acids)	Sequence Identity to Human Protein (%)	Sequence Similarity to Human Protein (%)	Sequence Divergence (n)	Corrected Sequence Divergence (m)
Protein of Interest	Homo sapiens	Transmembrane Protein 202	TMEM202	NP_001073931.1	273	100	100	0	0
Paralogs	Homo sapiens	Lens fiber membrane intrinsic protein isoform 2	LIMP2	NP_085915.2	215	14.5	28.6	85.5	193.1021537
	Homo sapiens	Protein NKG7 isoform 1	NKG7	NP_005592.1	165	14.3	27.9	85.7	194.4910649
	Homo sapiens	Claudin domain-containing protein 2	CLDND2	NP_689566.1	167	14.2	25.4	85.8	195.1928221
	Homo sapiens	Germ cell-specific gene 1 protein isoform 1	GSG1	NP_112579.2	285	8.5	15.3	91.5	246.5104022

Sequences characterized as paralogs were aligned to TMEM202 via pairwise analysis (PSA). The results of the PSA gave percent identity and similarity values, which were also used to calculate the sequence divergence value (n) and corrected sequence divergence value (m). Estimated median date of divergence is based on predicted values found on TimeTree.

=== Orthologs of TMEM202 ===
Orthologs were found using the NCBI Blast database by searching for proteins with similar sequences to the H. sapiens TMEM202 protein. All taxia with sequenced proteins, including bacteria, fungi and plants were searched; however, bony fish were found to be the most diverged species to have orthologous proteins. Orthologs were also found in amphibians, birds, reptiles, and mammals. Orthologs are characterized in the table below:

Orthologs of H. sapiens TMEM202.

TMEM202	Taxonomic Group	Genus and Species	Common Name	Accession Number	Median Date of Divergence (MYA)	Sequence Length (amino acids)	Sequence Identity to Human Protein (%)	Sequence Similarity to Human Protein (%)	Sequence Divergence (n)	Corrected Sequence Divergence (m)
Mammals	Primates	Homo sapiens	Human	NP_001073931.1	0	273	100.0	100.0	0.0	0.0
	Lagomorphs	Ochotona princeps	American pika	XP_004594772	87	263	58.3	71.4	41.7	54.0
	Perissodactyla	Diceros bicornis minor	South-central black rhinoceros	XP_058396452.1	94	271	76.6	82.4	23.4	26.7
	Artiodactyls	Sus scrofa	Wild boar	XP_005666231.1	94	271	68.9	79.1	31.1	37.3
	Chiroptera	Rousettus aegyptiacus	Egyptian fruit bat	XP_015982472.2	94	289	63.7	75.8	36.3	45.1
	Eulipotyphla	Condylura cristata	Star-nosed mole	XP_004687557.1	94	267	61.7	73.7	38.3	48.3
	Proboscideans	Elephas maximus indicus	Indian elephant	XP_049761646.1	99	266	73.6	82.1	26.4	30.7
	Diprotodontia	Vombatus ursinus	Common wombat	XP_027713789.1	160	288	42.6	55.1	57.4	85.3
	Carnivorous marsupials	Sarcophilus harrisii	Tasmanian devil	XP_031812217.1	160	324	38.4	50.8	61.6	95.7
Reptilia	Testudines	Chelydra serpentina	Common snapping turtle	KAG6921653.1	319	190	18.3	33.1	81.7	169.8
	Squamata	Podarcis lilfordi	Lilford's wall lizard	CAI5781213.1	319	193	18.0	32.5	82.0	171.5
	Squamata	Naja naja	Indian cobra	KAG8143384.1	319	150	17.0	27.8	83.0	177.2
	Testudines	Chrysemys picta bellii	Painted turtle	XP_065430698.1	319	484	12.5	20.5	87.5	207.9
Aves	Psittaciformes	Strigops habroptila	Kākāpō	XP_030329880.1	319	320	14.2	20.3	85.8	195.2
	Gruiformes	Grus japonensis	Red-crowned crane	GAB0205531.1	319	238	11.3	19.8	88.7	218.0
	Passeriformes	Pseudopodoces humilis	Ground tit	XP_005533382	319	641	7.7	11.2	92.3	256.4
Amphibia	Anura	Eleutherodactylus coqui	Common coquí	XP_066461729.1	352	192	20.1	31.9	79.9	160.4
	Anura	Ascaphus truei	Coastal tailed frog	MEE6481875.1	352	168	15.7	27.2	84.3	185.2
	Urodela	Pleurodeles waltl	Iberian ribbed newt	KAJ1132505.1	352	179	14.9	28.4	85.1	190.4
Vertebrata	Cypriniformes	Cyprinus carpio	Common carp	KTG06534.1	429	224	15.8	30.6	84.2	184.5
	Notacanthiformes	Aldrovandia affinis	Gilbert's halosaurid fish	KAJ8399001.1	429	173	14.2	28.4	85.8	195.2

Sequences characterized as orthologs were aligned to TMEM202 via pairwise analysis (PSA). The results of the PSA gave percent identity and similarity values, which were also used to calculate the sequence divergence value (n) and corrected sequence divergence value (m). Estimated median date of divergence is based on predicted values found on TimeTree.

=== Evolution of TMEM202 ===
The evolutionary history of TMEM202 appears to have begun approximately 429 years ago as orthologs of the protein were found in species of bony fish. Since then, TMEM202 has evolved in species of amphibians, reptiles, birds, and mammals. This evolution is quantified in Evolutionary History of TMEM202 compared to Fibrinogen a, cyctochrome C, where corrected sequence divergence of TMEM202 orthologs was graphed over time in comparison to fibrinogen a and cytochrome c.

==== Evolutionary History of TMEM202 compared to fibrinogen a, cytochrome C. ====
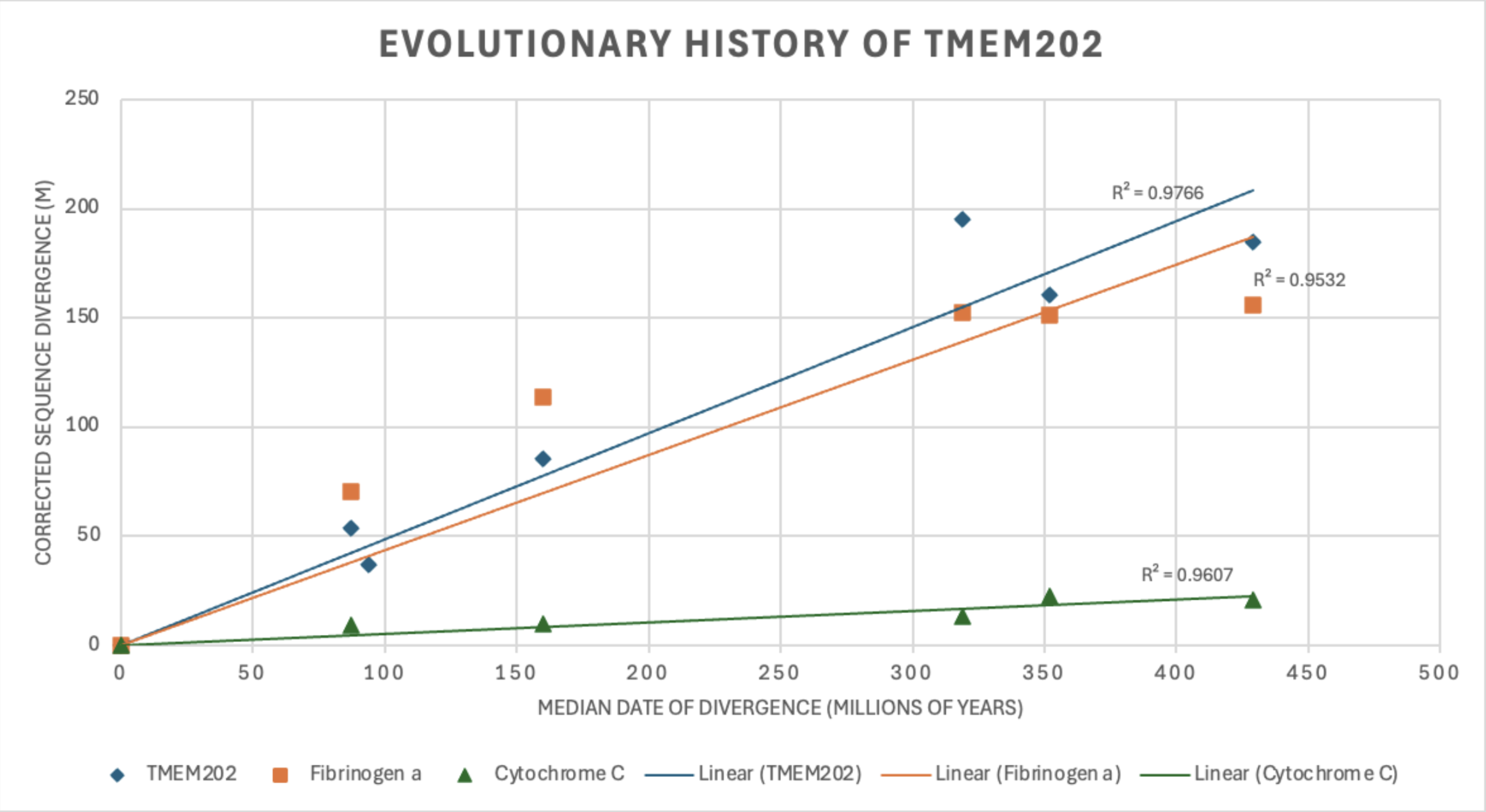
Evolutionary History of TMEM202 compared to Fibrinogen a, cyctochrome C in Humans.

Fibrinogen alpha (a) is a fast-evolving protein as compared to cytochrome c, a slow-evolving protein. Across its evolution, TMEM202 has undergone numerous amino acid mutations, as it has ascertained mutations at a similar rate to fibrinogen alpha. For this reason, TMEM202 can be considered a fast-evolving protein.

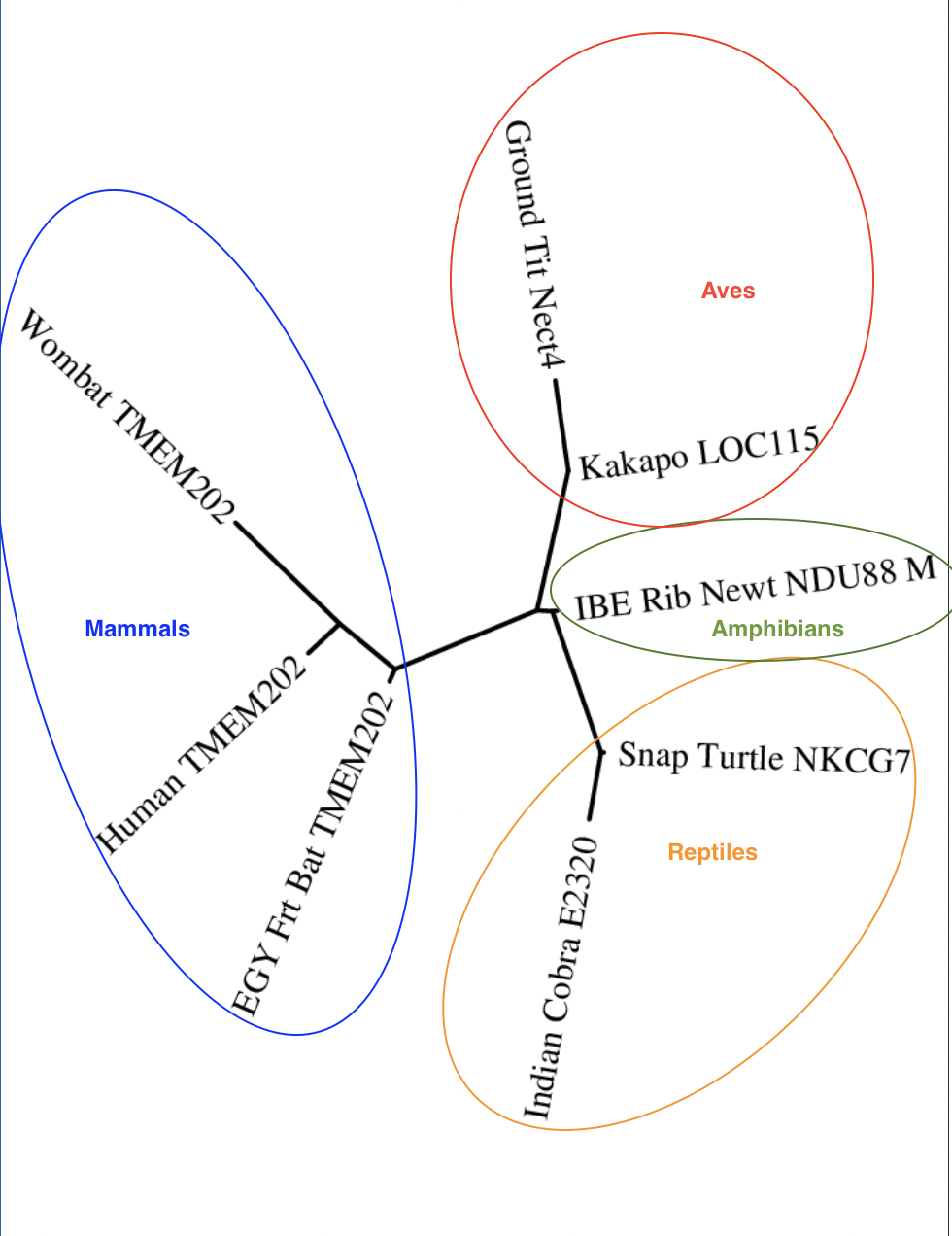
Unrooted Phylogenetic Tree of H. sapiens TMEM202 and its Orthologous Species.

To the left, Unrooted Phylogenetic Tree of Homo sapiens TMEM202 and its Orthologous Species, helps visualize divergence of some orthologs from humans. Species were further classified into mammals, aves, amphibians, and reptiles.

== TMEM202 interacting proteins ==
STRING Network revealed proteins found to interact with TMEM202 and are detailed in the table below. Along with those proteins, are kinases predicted to phosphorylate TMEM202.

=== Proteins predicted to interact with TMEM202 ===
Protein Abbreviation	Protein Name	Basis of Identification	Function	Notes
SPATA31D1	Spermatogenesis-associated protein 31D1	STRING Network	Might be involved in cell differentiation and spermatogenesis	Predicted to be a part of the cell membrane
CFAP45	Cilia and flagella associated protein 45	STRING Network	Enables AMP binding and is involved in establishing left/right asymmetry of the flagella	
SPACA1	Sperm acrosome membrane-associated protein 1	STRING Network	Aids in the acrosome expansion and establishment of normal sperm morphology during spermatogenesis	SPACA1 is recognized by anti-sperm antibodies in infertile males
PKC	Protein Kinase C	Predicted site of phosphorylation	Regulates numerous cellular responses including gene expression, protein secretion, cell proliferation, and the inflammatory response	
Cdk5	Cyclin-dependent kinase 5	Predicted site of phosphorylation	Plays a pivotal role in brain development (embryogenesis) and maintenance (adolescence and adulthood)	
Cdc2	Cell Division Cycle 2	Predicted site of phosphorylation	Regulates cell cycle progression	Also known as CDK1, or Cyclin Dependent Kinase 1

== Clinical significance and pathology ==
=== Mutations - Single Nucleotide Polymorphisms (SNPs) ===
There exist many identified SNPs in the TMEM202 gene. Found in the table below include six of the most common to occur within the promoter region and coding sequence of TMEM202.

=== SNPs in Human TMEM202 ===
SNP Name	SNP Location (Relative to TMEM202)	Mutation	Amino Acid Change	Frequency in human population (%)	Significance	Clinical Significance
rs74622826	164 bases upstream	G → A	Glycine → Glutamate	0.25	In promoter region	None reported in ClinVar
rs74343303	193 bases upstream	A→ C/G	Leucine → Leucine (Does not change)	0.01	In promoter region	None reported in ClinVar
rs114543781	284 bases upstream	C → T	Proline → Leucine	0.42	In promoter region	None reported in ClinVar
rs112986603	Base 117	C → T	32A → 32V	0.09	In coding sequence	None reported in ClinVar
rs16956904	Base 631	A → T	204M → 204L	3.71	In coding sequence within transmembrane region 4	None reported in ClinVar
rs35916586	Base 679	G → A/T/C	219S → 219T / 219S / 219P	0.01	In coding sequence	None reported in ClinVar

A small subset of the SNPs may have functional influences on TMEM202 based on where they occur. The SNP, rs16956904 at base 631, is within the fourth transmembrane region. While this is an area of importance, both the normal and SNP variation result in a hydrophobic amino acid. This could explain why no clinical / phenotypic discrepancies have been observed. SNP rs114543781, 284 bases upstream is present where transcription factor HOXB13 is predicted to bind. This transcription factor is involved in the developmental regulatory system that provides cells with positional identities along the anterior-posterior axis. SNP rs74343303, 193 bases upstream also interferes with FOXD3 binding. FOXD3 has the ability to act as a transcriptional activator and repressor.

== Conceptual translation of TMEM202 ==
Conceptual Translation of H. sapiens TMEM202.

Key found on page 2.
