= ZNF555 =

Human gene and protein

Identifiers
- Aliases: ZNF555, zinc finger protein 555
- External IDs: GeneCards: ZNF555

Gene location (Human)
Chr.	Chromosome 19 (human)
Band	19p13.3	Start	2,841,437 bp
Band	19p13.3	End	2,860,471 bp
RNA expression pattern
Bgee	Human / Mouse (ortholog); Top expressed in: amniotic fluid; secondary oocyte; sperm; gonad; buccal mucosa cell; testicle; cartilage tissue; ventricular zone; ganglionic eminence; islet of Langerhans / n/a; More reference expression data
BioGPS	n/a
Gene ontology
Molecular function	DNA binding; protein binding; metal ion binding; nucleic acid binding; DNA-binding transcription factor activity, RNA polymerase II-specific
Cellular component	intracellular anatomical structure; nucleus
Biological process	regulation of transcription, DNA-templated; transcription, DNA-templated; regulation of transcription by RNA polymerase II
Sources:Amigo / QuickGO
Orthologs
Databases	NCBI: entry; OMA: entry
Species	Human	Mouse
Entrez	148254	n/a
Ensembl	ENSG00000186300	n/a
UniProt	Q8NEP9	n/a
RefSeq (mRNA)	NM_001172775; NM_152791	n/a
RefSeq (protein)	NP_001166246; NP_690004	n/a
Location (UCSC)	Chr 19: 2.84 – 2.86 Mb	n/a
PubMed search		n/a
- Wikidata
View/Edit Human

Zinc finger protein 555 (ZNF555) protein encoded by the ZNF555 gene. It is located on the short arm (19p13.3 ) of the human chromosome 19 (hg38) at position chr19:2,841,573-2,853,952, spanning 12,380 base pairs. It contains four coding exons.

It belongs to the Krüppel associated box (KRAB) C2H2 zinc-finger family and is predicted to act as a sequence-specific transcriptional regulator. Experimental work in human myoblasts suggests that ZNF555 can bind a 4qA-subtelomeric enhancer and modulate expression of the mitochondrial ADP/ATP translocase gene SLC25A4 (ANT1), implicating it in mechanisms proposed for facioscapulohumeral muscular dystrophy (FSHD).

== Nomenclature ==
ZNF555 is also known by the synonym DiPRO1 (Death, Differentiation, and PROliferation-related PROtein 1), which was recently assigned based on newly discovered functions.

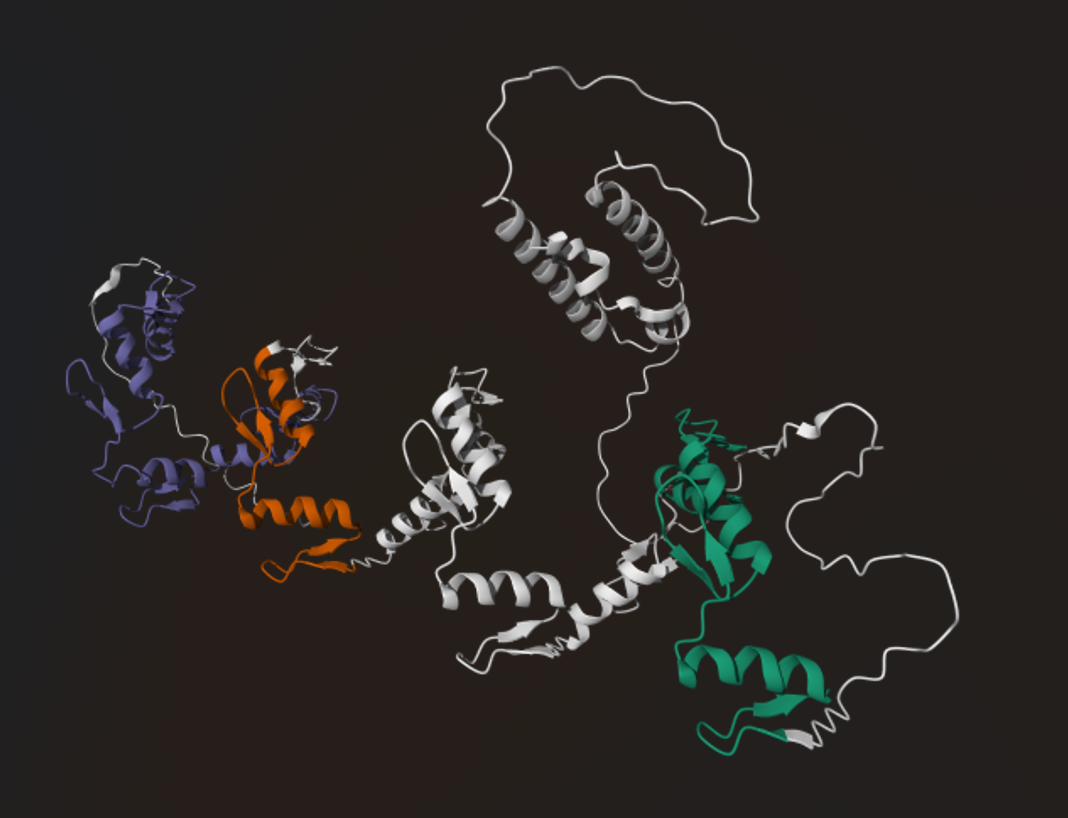
Predicted three-dimensional structure model of the human protein ZNF555 (UniProt ID: Q8NEP9), generated by the AlphaFold Protein Structure Database (DeepMind / EMBL-EBI).

ZNF555 Protein Structure.png

== Structure ==
The ZNF555 protein (Q8NEP9 · ZN555_HUMAN) is composed of 628 amino acids with a molecular weight of approximately 73.1 kDa. The protein contains one KRAB A-box domain and fifteen C2H2-type zinc finger domain.

Two additional isoforms are predicted:

- Q8NEP9-2, which consists of 543 amino acids and differs from the full-length isoform by lacking three zinc finger domains
- Q8NEP9-4, which has 627 amino acids and differs from the full-length isoform by a single amino acid.

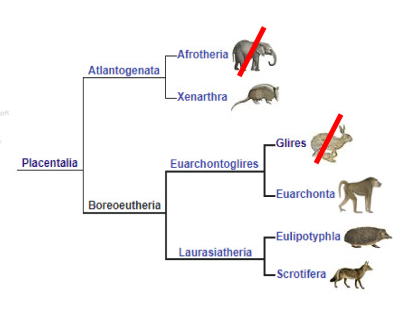
Evolutionary history of gain/loss events of the DiPRO1/ZNF555 gene (chr19:2.841.435-2.860.471, GRCh38). Adapted from Rich et al., 2024, EMBO Molecular Medicine, doi:10.1038/s44321-024-00097-z, under CC BY 4.0 license.

== Evolution and species distribution ==
Phylogenetic analysis suggests that the ZNF555 gene is conserved within placental mammals and may represent a relatively recent evolutionary development. Comparative genomic studies indicate a statistically significant expansion of the gene in pigs, American black bears, and ferrets, with these species possessing two copies of ZNF555. The gene is absent from most rodents, rabbits, and elephants, with the naked mole rat as an exception. This absence suggests that these common laboratory animal models may be unsuitable for research on ZNF555.

== Function ==
ZNF555 belongs to the KRAB (Kruppel-associated box) zinc finger protein (KRAB-ZFPs) family, which is involved in DNA and protein binding as well as transcriptional regulation. Although its precise biological function remains incompletely characterized, ZNF555 has been implicated in the epigenetic silencing of retrotransposable elements (REs), as well as in muscle cell differentiation and proliferation. Depending on its interacting protein partners, ZNF555 may act either as a transcriptional activator or repressor. Additionally, it may play a role in the regulation of CpG island methylation.

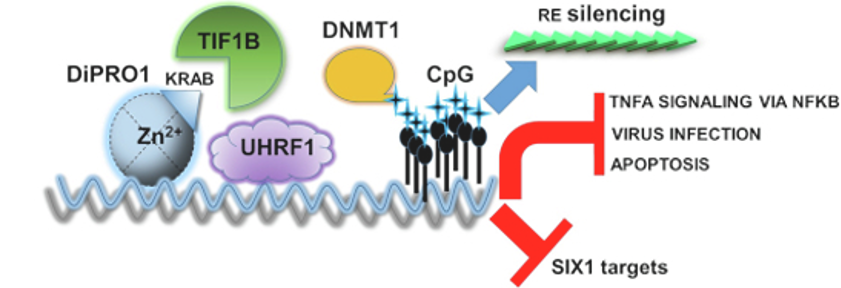
ZNF555 (DiPRO1) functions.

== Interactions ==
ZNF555/DiPRO1has been shown to interact with TIF1B/KAP1, UHRF1 and MCM protein complex. ZNF555 protein shares certain DNA-binding regions with SIX1, a transcription factor regulating myogenesis, and ZSCAN4, a zinc finger protein implicated in genomic stability.

== Clinical significance ==
ZNF555 has been associated with Facioscapulohumeral Muscular Dystrophy (FSHD). Additionally, ZNF555 has been linked to mesenchymal cancers, including rhabdomyosarcoma and Ewing sarcoma, where it is suggested to function as an inhibitor of cancer cell death.

== See also ==
- Zinc finger
- Transcription factor
- Chromosome 19
- CpG island
- Rhabdomyosarcoma
- Ewing sarcoma
- FSHD dystrophy
