= Zinc finger protein 684 =

Protein found in humans

ZNF684

Identifiers
- Aliases: ZNF684, zinc finger protein 684
- External IDs: GeneCards: ZNF684

Gene location (Human)
Chr.	Chromosome 1 (human)
Band	1p34.2	Start	40,531,573 bp
Band	1p34.2	End	40,548,167 bp
RNA expression pattern
Bgee	Human / Mouse (ortholog); Top expressed in: gonad; right lobe of liver; apex of heart; testicle; Achilles tendon; left ventricle; right auricle of heart; left adrenal gland; stromal cell of endometrium; right adrenal gland / n/a; More reference expression data
BioGPS	n/a
Gene ontology
Molecular function	DNA binding; metal ion binding; nucleic acid binding; DNA-binding transcription factor activity, RNA polymerase II-specific
Cellular component	intracellular anatomical structure; nucleus
Biological process	regulation of transcription, DNA-templated; transcription, DNA-templated; regulation of transcription by RNA polymerase II
Sources:Amigo / QuickGO
Orthologs
Databases	NCBI: entry; OMA: entry
Species	Human	Mouse
Entrez	127396	n/a
Ensembl	ENSG00000117010	n/a
UniProt	Q5T5D7	n/a
RefSeq (mRNA)	NM_152373	n/a
RefSeq (protein)	NP_689586	n/a
Location (UCSC)	Chr 1: 40.53 – 40.55 Mb	n/a
PubMed search		n/a
- Wikidata
View/Edit Human

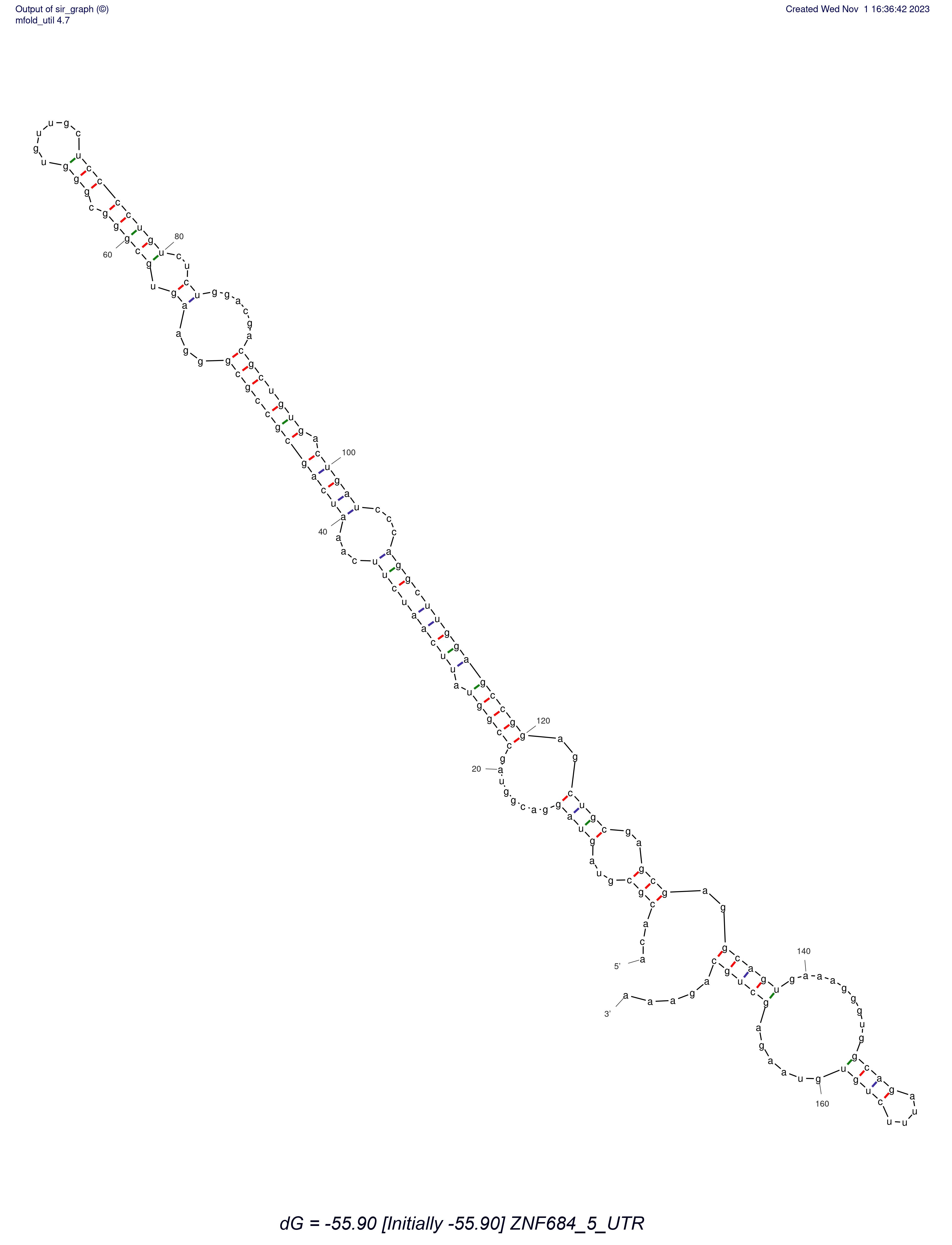
Figure 1. Human ZNF684 5' UTR Secondary Structure

Zinc finger protein 684 is a protein that in humans is encoded by the ZNF684 gene.

== Gene ==
The zinc finger protein 684 is also known as the Kruppel-associated box protein. Within humans, the ZNF684 gene is found on the plus strand at 1q34.2, spanning 16,594 nucleotides from 40,548,167 to 40,531,573.

== Transcript ==
Currently, there is one transcript variant encoding ZNF684. The transcript variant has five identified exon regions within ZNF684 and spans 2,019 base pairs (bp).

== Protein ==
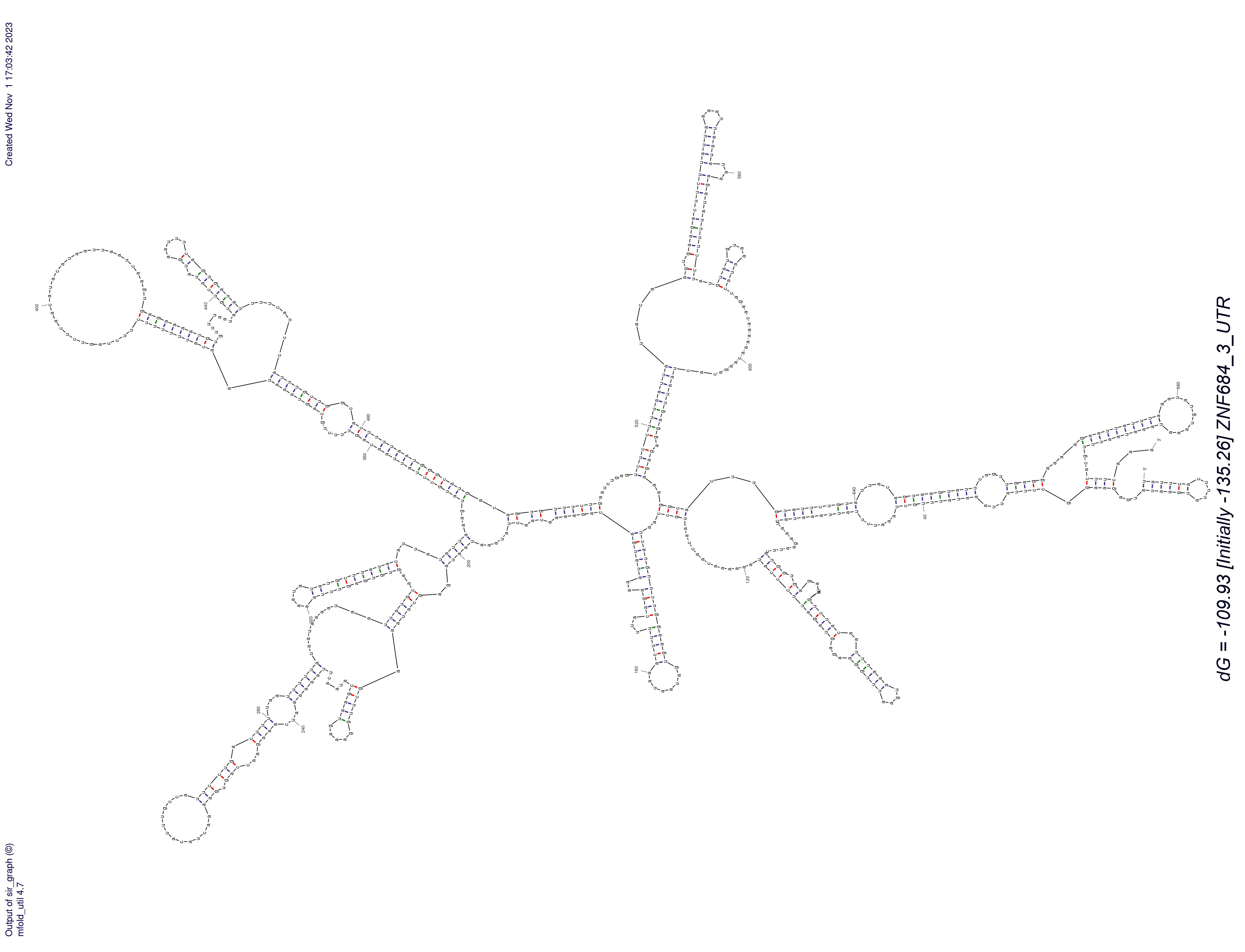
Figure 2. Human ZNF684 3' UTR Secondary Structure

The ZNF684 protein in humans is 378 amino acids long. Human ZNF684 has a molecular weight of 32,945 Da and basal isoelectric point of 9.06. The ZNF684 protein contains the Kruppel-associated box A (KRAB-A) domain, which functions as a transcriptional repressor. Within the ZNF684 protein, there are 8 C2H2 zinc finger structural motif (zf-C2H2) domain, which are known to bind either zinc ions or nucleic acid. Within those domains, cystine and histidine are the primary amino acids involved in zinc ion (Zn^{2+}) or nucleic acid binding. The human ZNF684 protein is rich in lysine and histidine, and poor in alanine. Predicted secondary structures of ZNF684 demonstrate a variable number of alpha helices, beta sheets, helical turns, and coils throughout the protein.

== Regulation ==
=== Gene ===
==== Tissue Distribution ====
In terms of gene expression, ZNF684 has ubiquitous expression in all human tissues. Microarray data illustrates higher expression of ZNF684 within the liver. This is further supported by data which depicts a decrease in ZNF684 expression in liver cells within individuals with liver cancer. There was also higher expressions of ZNF684 within the kidney compared to other tissues. Evidence of decreased ZNF684 expression is observed with individuals with renal cancer.

Within fetuses, the ubiquitous expression of ZNF684 gene is present in all tissues throughout the gestational period of 10 to 20 weeks. There is a higher level of expression of ZNF684 in the heart at 20 weeks of gestation, and a decreased level of expression in kidneys at 20 week of gestation.

=== Transcript ===
Using RNAfold, minimum free energy structures were created based on the extended 5' and 3' untranslated region (UTR) in the human sequence (Figure 1-2).

=== Protein ===
It is predicted that ZNF684 localizes within the nucleus, which aligns with the protein's known functions as a transcription factor. It has also been predicted to localize within the cytoplasm.

== Homology/ evolution ==
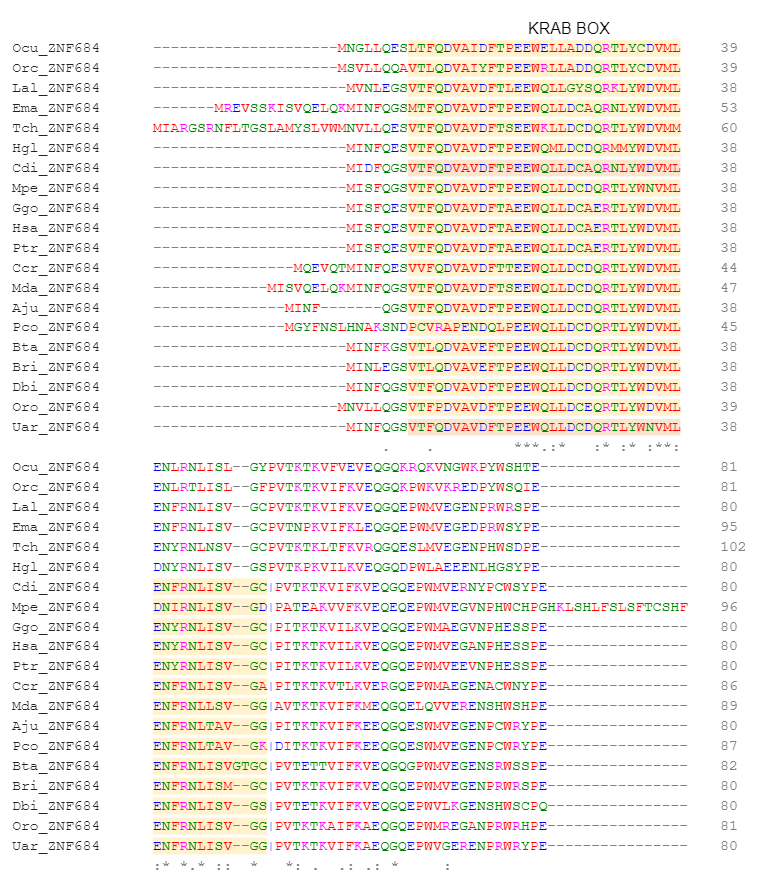
Figure 3. ZNF684 multiple sequence alignment of the Kruppel-associated box across 20 different placental species.

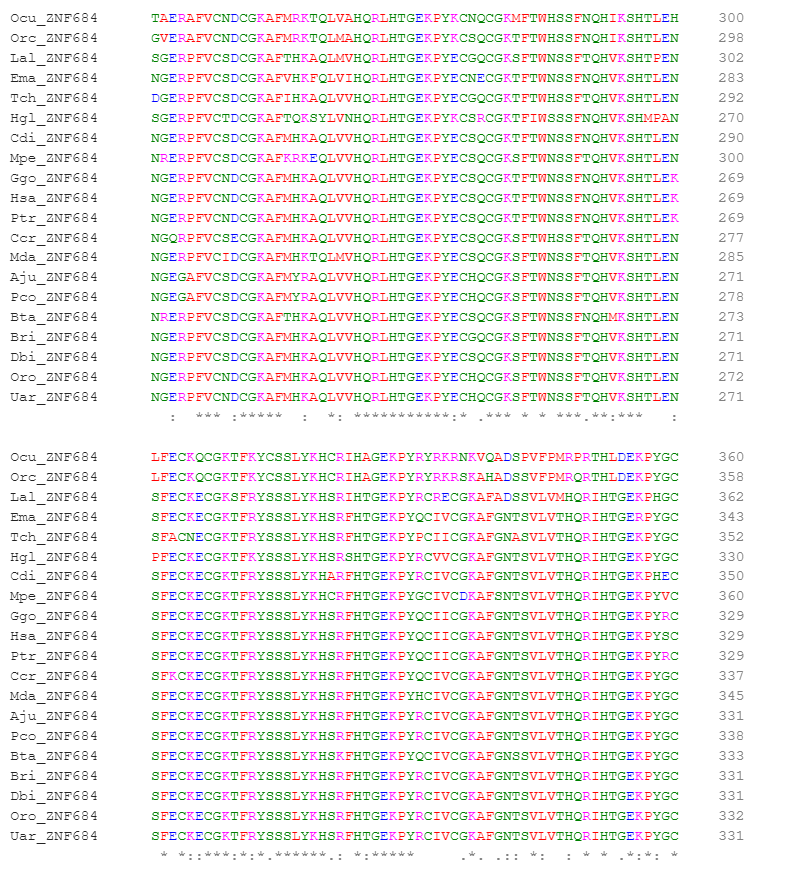
Figure 4. ZNF684 multiple sequence alignment of zinc finger domains across 20 different placental mammals.

Homologs of the ZNF684 gene have been found across eukaryotes and bacteria species. Strict orthologs were only found within placental mammals. The gene is also closely related to the paralog ZFP25 in humans. Across the various species in which ZNF684 strict ortholog is present, conservation of C2H2 binding sites and the Kruppel-associated box is apparent (Figure 3-4). The list of the various mammalian placental species are summarized in Table 1 by their median date of divergence from Homo sapiens.

Table 1. ZNF684 Isoform 1 Strict Ortholog Table Across Placental Mammals
Genus and Species	Common Name	Taxonomic Group	Median Date of Divergence	Accession #	Sequence Length (aa)	Sequence Identity to Human Protein (%)	Sequence Similarity to Human Protein ()
Homo sapiens	Human	Primates	0.0	NP_689586.3	378	100.0	100.0
Pan troglodytes	Chimpanzee	Primates	6.4	XP_513358.3	378	98.9	98.9
Macaca mulatta	Rhesus monkey	Primates	28.8	XP_028691269.1	398	77.3	78.0
Tupaia chinensis	Chinese treeshrew	Scandentia	85.0	XP_006164992.2	401	75.9	82.6
Heterocephalus glaber	Naked mole-rat	Rodentia	87.0	XP_021105597.1	380	79.5	88.7
Castor canadensis	American beaver	Rodentia	87.0	XP_020027280.1	352	77.3	78.0
Oryctolagus cuniculus	Rabbit	Lagomorpha	87.0	XP_051713856.1	405	48.2	61.0
Ochotona curzoniae	Black-lipped pika	Lagomorpha	87.0	XP_040830236.1	407	45.5	61.2
Bos taurus	Cattle	Artiodactyla	94.0	XP_024845985.1	382	81.2	88.7
Balaenoptera ricei	Rices whale	Artiodactyla	94.0	XP_059753474.1	380	85.0	90.5
Ursus arctos	Brown bear	Carnivora	94.0	XP_057161231.1	380	86.3	90.8
Acinonyx jubatus	Cheetah	Carnivora	94.0	XP_053068190.1	380	82.9	89.2
Diceros bicornis minor	South-central black rhinoceros	Perissodactyla	94.0	XP_058409785.1	380	86.8	91.8
Pteropus alecto	Large flying fox	Chiroptera	94.0	XP_023377766.1	378	84.2	89.5
Myotis daubentonii	Daubentons bat	Chiroptera	94.0	XP_059545721.1	394	79.0	84.8
Condylura cristata	Star-nosed mole	Eulipotyphla	94.0	XP_012577988.1	386	80.3	87.6
Manis pentadactyla	Chinese pango	Pholidota	94.0	XP_057356056.1	409	74.3	79.2
Trichechus manatus	Florida manatee	Afrotheria	99.0	XP_023582938.1	380	82.1	88.9
Elephas maximus indicus	Elephant	Afrotheria	99.0	XP_049734871.1	392	76.7	84.8
Choloepus didactylus	Two-toed sloth	Pilosa	99.0	XP_037683504.1	399	79.2	83.2

== Interacting Proteins ==
Multiple interactions were detected between ZNF684 and other proteins. TRIM28 is a transcription factor co-repressor that interacts with the KRAB domain. TRIM28 recruits components for histone methylation and histone deacetylation, leading to changes in chromatin structure that repress gene expression.

== Functions ==
ZNF684 physically interacts with mRNA export factors and directly binds to RNA.
