= KRABD3 =

Protein-coding gene in humans

Identifiers
- Aliases: KRABD3, KRAB-A domain containing 1, KRBA1, KRAB domain containing 3
- External IDs: MGI: 1925077; GeneCards: KRABD3

Gene location (Human)
Chr.	Chromosome 7 (human)
Band	7q36.1	Start	149,714,781 bp
Band	7q36.1	End	149,734,575 bp

Gene location (Mouse)
Chr.	Chromosome 6 (mouse)
Band	6|6 B2.3	Start	48,372,520 bp
Band	6|6 B2.3	End	48,396,715 bp
RNA expression pattern
Bgee	Human / Mouse (ortholog); Top expressed in: cardiac muscle tissue of right atrium; apex of heart; right auricle of heart; anterior pituitary; left ventricle; right hemisphere of cerebellum; right frontal lobe; germinal epithelium; gastric mucosa; body of uterus / Top expressed in: spermatocyte; spermatid; muscle of thigh; seminiferous tubule; tail of embryo; genital tubercle; superior frontal gyrus; neural layer of retina; cerebellar cortex; dentate gyrus of hippocampal formation granule cell; More reference expression data
BioGPS	n/a
Gene ontology
Molecular function	molecular function
Cellular component	cellular component
Biological process	biological process
Sources:Amigo / QuickGO
Orthologs
Databases	NCBI: entry; OMA: entry
Species	Human	Mouse
Entrez	84626	77827
Ensembl	ENSG00000133619	ENSMUSG00000042810
UniProt	A5PL33	Q6NXZ1
RefSeq (mRNA)	NM_001290187; NM_032534	NM_133922; NM_001347152; NM_001347153; NM_001362144; NM_001362145
RefSeq (protein)	NP_001277116; NP_115923	NP_001334081; NP_001334082; NP_598683; NP_001349073; NP_001349074
Location (UCSC)	Chr 7: 149.71 – 149.73 Mb	Chr 6: 48.37 – 48.4 Mb
PubMed search
- Wikidata
View/Edit Human	View/Edit Mouse

KRAB domain-containing protein 3 is a protein that in humans is encoded by the KRABD3 gene (previously KRBA1). It is located on the plus strand of chromosome 7 from 149,411,872 to 149,431,664. It is also commonly known under two other aliases: KIAA1862 and KRAB A Domain Containing 1 gene and encodes the KRBA1 protein in humans. The KRBA family of genes is understood to encode different transcriptional repressor proteins

== Gene ==
Location of KRBA1 Gene on chromosome 7 as designated by the red line

The KRBA1 gene is located on chromosome 7 at 7q36 in humans. It is 3786 base pairs in length with 17 exons total, however the coding sequence is only 3196 base pairs long resulting in a protein with 1064 amino acids.

== Protein ==
The KRBA1 protein has a predicted isoelectric point of 7.8pI and a predicted molecular weight of 112 kD which makes it a relatively large and neutral protein. This protein is primarily made up of four amino acids. The four major ones are: Proline at 15.7%, Glycine at 11.2%, Serine at 10.9%, and Leucine at 10.2%. Proline is present in well above average proportions. However, it was the only one as such and the amino acids M, N, Y, I, and F are all present in just below average proportions.

=== Isoforms ===
There are two isoforms for this protein known simply as isoform 1 and 2. Isoform 1 is the smaller one as it has a shorter N-terminus. Additionally, its 5'-UTR is different and its start codon is farther downstream.

=== Domains and motifs ===
The domain of function is the KRBA box which is predicted to start at base pair 7 and end at base pair 47. For motifs there was a leucine zipper and two nuclear localization signals (NLS) were found. Additionally, two fairly large proline rich regions are present towards the C-terminus of the protein.

The leucine zipper is present at base pair 837: LHSLGAALAEKLDRLATALAGL

One 4 pattern and one 7 pattern NLS were found

pat4: KRPR @ 763bp

pat7: PSRRKSH @ 217bp

=== Secondary and tertiary structure ===
Using the GOR4 program, it can be inferred that KRBA1 has very little specific secondary structure composed of mostly random coil regions. Random coil regions constitute 75.00% of the protein, while alpha helices constitute 16.26% and extended strands 8.74%. The alpha helices are broken up into many sections throughout the protein.

== DNA level regulation ==
=== Promoter ===
The promoter region was chosen using ElDorado at Genomatix, which assessed the KRBA1 gene locus for possible promoter regions. Out of nine possible promoter sets, Promoter Set 2 (GXP_660502) was chosen, as its transcripts had much higher numbers of CAGE tags than any other set. Coding transcript GXT_27212195 was used, as it had the highest number of exons (17/17 possible), and matched with the NM_001290187 accession number on NCBI for KRBA1 mRNA.

=== Transcription factor binding sites ===
As determined by MatInspector at Genomatix, the following are transcription factors (TFs) predicted to bind to KRBA1 in the promoter region. They were selected based on increased similarity scores and increased occurrences.
Matrix Family	Detailed Family Information	Matrix	Detailed Matrix Information	Starting bp	Ending bp	Anchor bp	Strand	Similarity	Sequence
V$ZTRE	Zinc transcriptional regulatory element	V$ZTRE.03	5' half site of ZTRE motif	1141	1157	1149	(+)	0.993	ccCTCCccctcggccca
V$ZTRE	Zinc transcriptional regulatory element	V$ZTRE.03	5' half site of ZTRE motif	898	914	906	(-)	0.989	ccCTCCcctcgtccccg
V$ZTRE	Zinc transcriptional regulatory element	V$ZTRE.04	3' half site of ZTRE motif	1133	1149	1141	(-)	0.984	gggGGAGgggcgggggt
V$ZTRE	Zinc transcriptional regulatory element	V$ZTRE.04	3' half site of ZTRE motif	906	922	914	(+)	0.983	aggGGAGggggcgggga
V$PLAG	Pleomorphic adenoma gene	V$PLAG1.01	Pleomorphic adenoma gene (PLAG) 1, a developmentally regulated C2H2 zinc finger protein	66	88	77	(+)	0.951	cgGAGGccgggacgaggggttgt
V$PLAG	Pleomorphic adenoma gene	V$PLAG1.02	Pleomorphic adenoma gene 1	307	329	318	(-)	1	aaGGGGgcctgcggggctaagcc
V$PLAG	Pleomorphic adenoma gene	V$PLAG1.02	Pleomorphic adenoma gene 1	459	481	470	(+)	1	caGGGGgaggcagaggagagtgg
V$PLAG	Pleomorphic adenoma gene	V$PLAG1.02	Pleomorphic adenoma gene 1	30	52	41	(+)	1	gaGGGGgctttgcccgagtgggc
V$SMAD	Vertebrate SMAD family of transcription factors	V$SMAD3.01	Smad3 transcription factor involved in TGF-beta signaling	199	209	204	(+)	0.994	gctGTCTgggc
V$SMAD	Vertebrate SMAD family of transcription factors	V$SMAD3.01	Smad3 transcription factor involved in TGF-beta signaling	213	223	218	(+)	0.996	aagGTCTggac
V$SMAD	Vertebrate SMAD family of transcription factors	V$SMAD3.01	Smad3 transcription factor involved in TGF-beta signaling	428	438	433	(-)	0.994	ctgGTCTgggc
V$SMAD	Vertebrate SMAD family of transcription factors	V$SMAD3.02	Smad3 transcription factor involved in TGF-beta signaling factor PU.1	363	373	368	(-)	0.993	cctGTCTggag
V$AHRR	AHR-arnt heterodimers and AHR-related factors	V$AHRARNT.03	DRE (dioxin response elements), XRE (xenobiotic response elements) bound by AHR/ARNT heterodimers	41	65	53	(+)	0.971	gcccgagtggGCGTgcgcctttcct
V$AHRR	AHR-arnt heterodimers and AHR-related factors	V$AHRARNT.03	DRE (dioxin response elements), XRE (xenobiotic response elements) bound by AHR/ARNT heterodimers	246	270	258	(+)	0.952	agtctcctctGCGTgggaccacagc
V$AHRR	AHR-arnt heterodimers and AHR-related factors	V$AHRARNT.01	Aryl hydrocarbon receptor / Arnt heterodimers	556	580	568	(-)	0.97	gtcacattttgCGTGcctgtttgct
V$AHRR	AHR-arnt heterodimers and AHR-related factors	V$AHRARNT.03	DRE (dioxin response elements), XRE (xenobiotic response elements) bound by AHR/ARNT heterodimers	658	682	670	(-)	0.956	gtccggccggGCGTgggtgggacag

=== Expression pattern ===
In humans, this gene is ubiquitously expressed at a fairly low level, approximately 0.6 times the expression of the average gene. Keeping that in mind, this gene is expressed the most in the heart. There is some expression in other areas such as the reproductive organs and the brain, but it is much less. When it comes to the common mouse Mus musculus, the expression of the KRBA1 gene occurs in different areas of the body compared to humans. In mice, the highest expression isn't in the heart but in the reproductive organs along with the adrenal gland and thymus.

== Protein level regulation ==
=== Localization ===
This protein is localized in the nucleus. The gene is predicted to contain two nuclear localization signals (NLS) both a 4 residue pattern and 7 residue pattern signal.

=== Post translational modifications ===
There weren't many different types of post translational modifications that were found. However, the few that were found occur throughout the protein at high levels. The few that were found were: O-GlcNAc, O-Glycosylation, and net phosphorylation, and glycation. All four of them have a multitude of sites throughout the entire protein.

== Homology and evolution ==
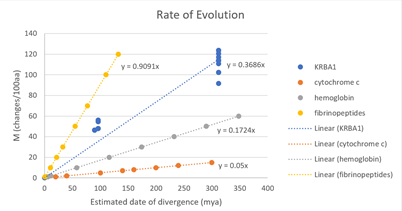
The mutation rate of KRBA1 compared to fibrinopeptides, hemoglobin, and cytochrome c.

KRBA1 orthologs have a relatively high mutation rate as seen in the graph below comparing KRBA1 with fibrinopeptides, hemoglobin, and cytochrome C. The orthologs in the table below are sorted by sequence identity and similarity.

This table displays 10 relatively distant orthologs with sequence identity ranging from 63%-36%
Genus and Species	Common name	Taxonomic Group	Date of divergence (MYA)	Accession number	Sequence length (aa)	Sequence identity %	Sequence similarity
Homo sapiens	Humans	primates	n/a	NP_001277116.1	1064	100%	100%
Equus asinus	Asinus	Equidae	96	XP_014686007.1	1179	63%	69%
Leptonychotes weddellii	Weddell seal	Pinnipedia	96	XP_030881320.1	1142	63%	69%
Phoca vitulina	Harbor seal	Pinnipedia	96	XP_032257255.1	1184	63%	69%
Nannospalax galili	Greater mole rat	Rodentia	90	XP_008832018.1	1103	62%	69%
Felis catus	Cat	Felidae	96	XP_011278956.2	1159	62%	67%
Mus musculus	Mouse	Rodentia	90	NP_001334081.1	1078	58%	67%
Mus Pahari	Garidner's shrewmouse	Rodentia	90	XP_029390880.1	1086	57%	66%
Gallus gallus	Chicken	Aves	312	XP_025003155.1	555	40%	52%
Pogona vitticeps	Central bearded dragon	Reptilia	312	XP_020655832.1	1697	36%	51%

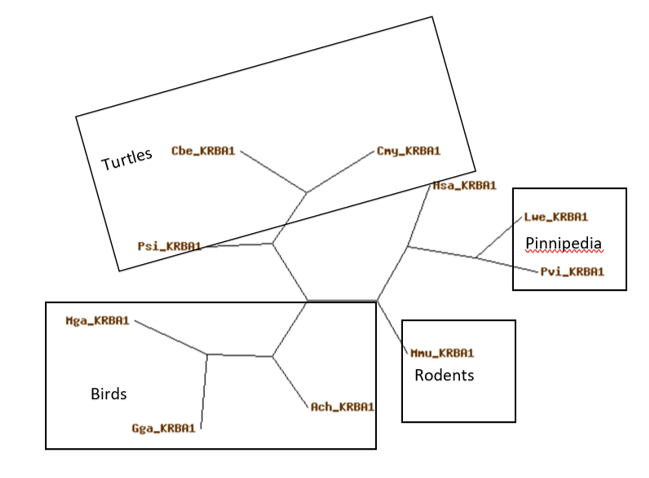
This picture depicts a time-calibrated, unrooted, phylogenetic tree of a few organisms that have orthologs of the KRBA1 gene.

== Function and biochemistry ==
The domain of function on this gene is known as the KRAB (Kruppel-associated box) domain - A box and it spans from amino acid 7 to 47. It is a transcription repression domain within the zinc finger proteins subgroup of the KRAB-ZFPs family. The KRAB domain interacts with and recruits other proteins and corepressors and then represses transcription. The mechanism appears to be the following: the KRBA proteins via their KRAB domain recruit the repressor KAP1 (KRAB-associated protein-1, also known as transcription intermediary factor 1 beta, KRAB-A interacting protein). The KAP1/ KRAB complex then recruits the heterochromatin protein 1 (HP1), and other chromatin modulating proteins, leading to transcriptional repression through heterochromatin formation.

== Interacting proteins ==
Using the STRING database, two interacting proteins were found to have high confidence interaction scores. High interaction scores are any scores above 0.7. The two proteins are Transcription intermediary factor 1-beta (TRIM28) with a score of 0.903 and Leucine-rich repeat-containing protein 61 (LRRC61) with a score 0.803.

== Clinical significance ==
A research done by Zaibo Li et al. displayed the KRAB-A-Domain in action. The von-Hippel Lindau tumor suppressor (pVHL) is a part of protein complex known as E3 ubiquitin ligase and targets hypoxia-inducible-factor 1a (HIF-1a) for breakdown. It is reported that there is a new protein that was discovered that interacts with the pVHL protein and helps it with its job. pVHL works by bringing in histone deacetylases, and it is helped by a certain domain on this new protein. It is shown in a study by Li et al. that this domain is the KRAB-A-domain and it mediates pVHL's transcriptional repression of HIF-1a. Additionally, the research shows that the KRAB-A-domain is shown to repress transcription on top of its ability to recruit histone deacetylases.
