= ZNF816 =

Protein-coding gene in humans

Identifiers
- Aliases: ZNF816, ZNF816A, zinc finger protein 816
- External IDs: GeneCards: ZNF816

Gene location (Human)
Chr.	Chromosome 19 (human)
Band	19q13.41	Start	52,949,379 bp
Band	19q13.41	End	52,962,911 bp
RNA expression pattern
Bgee	Human / Mouse (ortholog); Top expressed in: buccal mucosa cell; gonad; rectum; epithelium of colon; testicle; islet of Langerhans; Achilles tendon; granulocyte; right uterine tube; cerebellar hemisphere / n/a; More reference expression data
BioGPS	n/a
Gene ontology
Molecular function	DNA-binding transcription factor activity; DNA binding; metal ion binding; nucleic acid binding; DNA-binding transcription factor activity, RNA polymerase II-specific
Cellular component	intracellular anatomical structure; nucleus
Biological process	regulation of transcription, DNA-templated; transcription, DNA-templated; regulation of transcription by RNA polymerase II
Sources:Amigo / QuickGO
Orthologs
Databases	NCBI: entry; OMA: entry
Species	Human	Mouse
Entrez	125893	n/a
Ensembl	ENSG00000180257	n/a
UniProt	Q0VGE8	n/a
RefSeq (mRNA)	NM_001202457; NM_001031665; NM_001202456	n/a
RefSeq (protein)	NP_001026835; NP_001189385; NP_001189386	n/a
Location (UCSC)	Chr 19: 52.95 – 52.96 Mb	n/a
PubMed search		n/a
- Wikidata
View/Edit Human

Zinc Finger Protein 816 (ZNF816) is a protein encoded by the ZNF816 gene, located on chromosome 19 in humans.

== Gene ==
The ZNF816 gene is located on the minus-strand of chromosome 19, cytogenetic band 19q13.41. It spans 35,746 base pairs, from 52,927,135 to 52,962,881, containing 5 exons.

Ideogram of human chromosome 19

== Transcripts ==
ZNF816 has three transcript variants, the longest is 2,711 base pairs, with 5 exons. The other two have 4 exons, while all three isoforms encode 651 amino acids. The molecular weight and isoelectric point of is consistent across all three isoforms.

Isoform number	AC#	mRNA length (base pairs)	Exons	AC#	Protein Length (Amino Acids)
1	NM_001031665	2711	5	NP_001026835	651
2	NM_001202456.3	2570	4	NP_001189385	651
3	NM_001202457.3	2560	4	NP_001189386.1	651

== Proteins ==
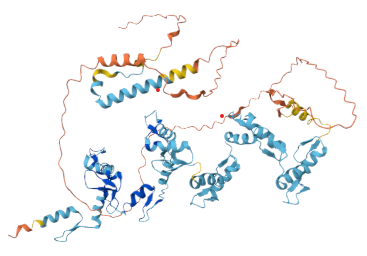
AlphaFold predicted secondary structure of ZNF816

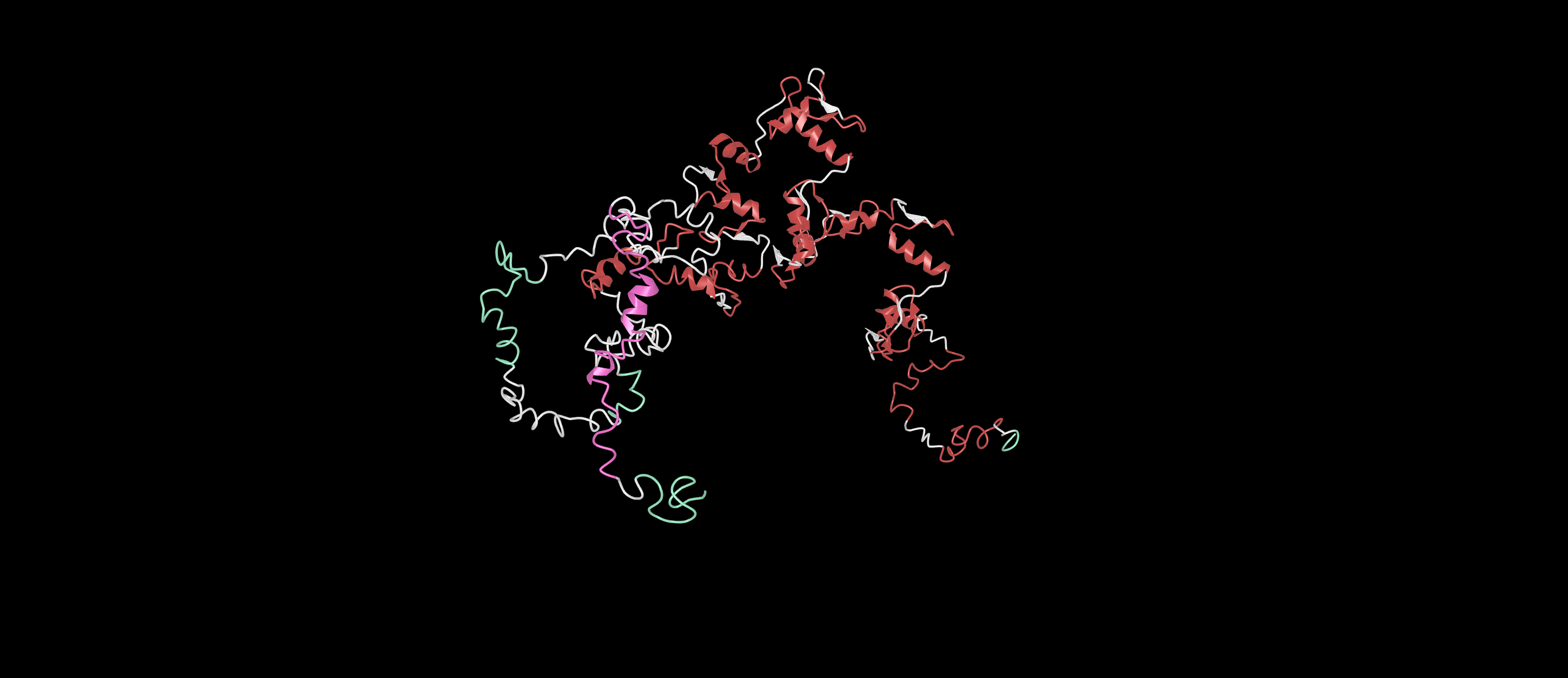
iTasser predicted tertiary structure of ZNF816 with annotated KRAB domain, disordered regions, and C2H2 Zn fingers

The product protein of the ZNF816 gene is 651 amino acids in length, with a predicted molecular weight of 75.7 kDa and an isoelectric point of 9.44.

=== Domains ===
ZNF816 has a Krüppel-associated box, which is characterized by a KRAB domain and an array of fifteen C2H2 Zinc fingers. This domain suppresses transcription by recruiting co-repressor proteins, which create heterochromatin, blocking RNA polymerase from accessing the gene. The amino acid sequence includes six disordered regions, and eight protein binding sites.

=== Structure ===
The predicted secondary structure of ZNF816 from AlphaFold consists of mainly alpha helices, from the C2H2 zinc finger motifs. The tertiary structure of ZNF816 was predicted by iTasser and annotated (Icn3D) according to the characteristics of other zinc finger proteins and prominent domains.

== Gene level regulation ==
ZNF816 shows a moderately variable expression pattern, with detectable levels in most tissues. While some tissues, like the adrenal gland, testes, thyroid, and salivary gland, exhibit relatively higher expression, ZNF816 is generally expressed across a wide range of tissues.

=== RNA-seq data ===
RNA-seq data confirm that ZNF816 is broadly expressed at varying levels across tissues. In normal tissues, it shows moderate to high mRNA levels, suggesting consistent transcriptional activity. Data from 20 human tissues further support the gene's widespread expression, with some variability in transcription levels.

=== In situ hybridization ===
In situ hybridization results from the Allen Brain Atlas confirm widespread expression across human brain regions, including the hippocampus, cortex, and cerebellum.

=== Protein localization and abundance ===
Immunohistochemistry data show ZNF816 protein is localized in the nucleus (95.7%) across various human tissues. It is seen to be expressed at high levels relative to other proteins.

== Homology/evolution ==
=== Paralogs ===
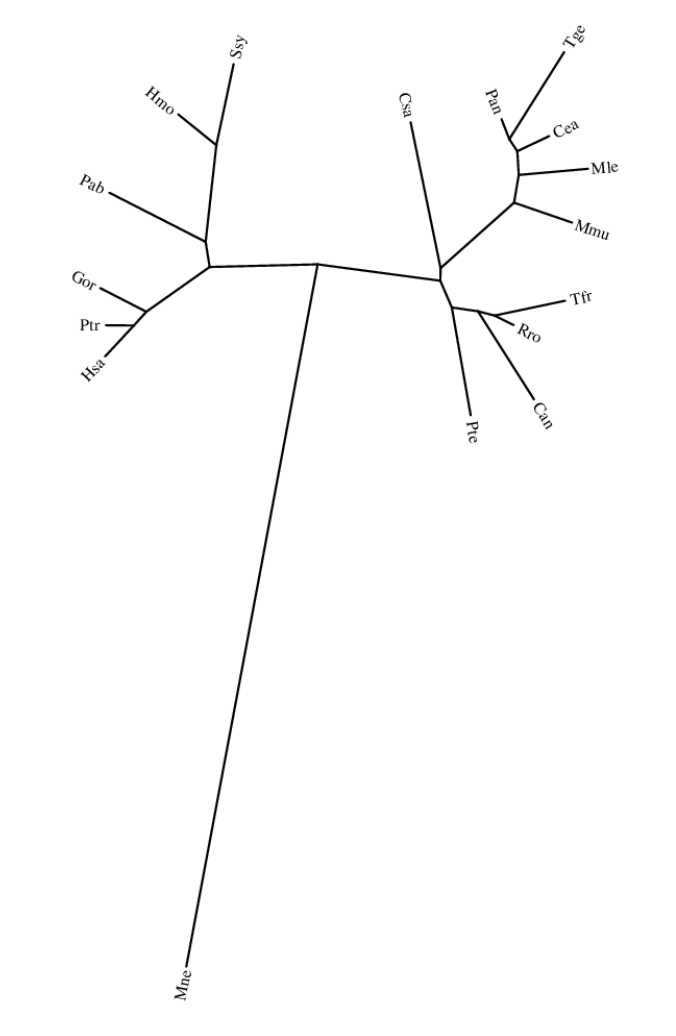
Phylogenetic tree of ZNF816 in humans and orthologs, identified by species name abbreviations.

ZNF816 has several paralogs within the zinc finger protein family. Its closest paralog is ZNF813, which shares 69.74% sequence identity. A more distant paralog is ZNF836, with 52.03% identity. These paralogs likely maintain similar roles in transcriptional regulation, reflecting the conserved functions characteristic of zinc finger proteins.

=== Orthologs ===
Orthologs of human ZNF816 are highly conserved in mammals, specifically primates. The closest ortholog is found in the bonobo (Pan paniscus), with 88.8% identity, indicating strong conservation within the Hominidae family. The most divergent ortholog is found in the olive baboon (Papio anubis), with 78.2% identity, reflecting moderate divergence within primates. Orthologs are absent in non-mammalian species.

Species name	Genus	Common name	Family	Date of div. (MYA)	% Identity	% similarity	Protein length (Amino Acids)	Accession Number
Homo sapiens	Homo	Human	Hominidae	0	100.00%	100.00%	651	NP_001189386
Pan paniscus	Pan	Bonobo	Hominidae	6.4	88.80%	90.00%	598	XP_024782426.3
Pan troglodytes	Pan	Chimpanzee	Hominidae	6.4	80.50%	81.30%	730	XP_054528711.1
Gorilla gorilla gorilla	Gorilla	Western lowland gorilla	Hominidae	8.6	51.70%	52.60%	681	XP_030860498.2
Pongo pygmaeus	Pongo	Bornean orangutan	Hominidae	15.2	86.60%	88.30%	642	XP_054321989.1
Pongo abelii	Pongo	Sumatran orangutan	Hominidae	15.2	80.40%	81.80%	698	XP_024093826.3
Symphalangus syndactylus	Symphalangus	Siamang	Hylobatidae	19.5	79.30%	81.8%	749	XP_063471613.1
Hylobates moloch	Hylobates	Silvery gibbon	Hylobatidae	19.5	83.00%	85.90%	721	XP_058281887.1
Cercocebus atys	Cercocebus	Sooty mangabey	Cercopithecidae	28.8	80.50%	85.10%	697	XP_011936585.1
Macaca fascicularis	Macaca	Long-tailed macaque (Crab-eating macaque)	Cercopithecidae	28.8	80.80%	85.10%	697	XP_005590270.3
Rhinopithecus bieti	Rhinopithecus	Black snub-nosed monkey	Cercopithecidae	28.8	82.00%	86.20%	694	XP_017714826.1
Colobus angolensis palliatus	Colobus	Angolan black-and-white colobus	Cercopithecidae	28.8	82.10%	85.80%	641	XP_011801561.1
Papio anubis	Papio	Olive baboon	Cercopithecidae	28.8	78.20%	83.00%	717	XP_009193448.2
Rhinopithecus roxellana	Rhinopithecus	Golden snub-nosed monkey	Cercopithecidae	28.8	74.20%	77.70%	776	XP_010374801.2
Theropithecus gelada	Theropithecus	Gelada	Cercopithecidae	28.8	77.60%	82.10%	695	XP_025222771.1
Macaca mulatta	Macaca	Rhesus macaque	Cercopithecidae	28.8	80.80%	85.10%	697	XP_014980263.2
Chlorocebus sabaeus	Chlorocebus	Green monkey (Savanna monkey)	Cercopithecidae	28.8	78.30%	83.30%	647	XP_037847362.1
Trachypithecus francoisi	Trachypithecus	François' langur	Cercopithecidae	28.8	75.70%	80.20%	726	XP_033084859.1
Macaca nemestrina	Macaca	Southern pig-tailed macaque	Cercopithecidae	28.8	65.90%	71.00%	721	XP_011766059.1
Mandrillus leucophaeus	Mandrillus	Drill	Cercopithecidae	28.8	76.30%	81.10%	669	XP_011835608.1
Piliocolobus tephrosceles	Piliocolobus	Ugandan red colobus	Cercopithecidae	28.8	70.20%	73.80%	812	XP_023051555.1

=== Evolutionary rate ===
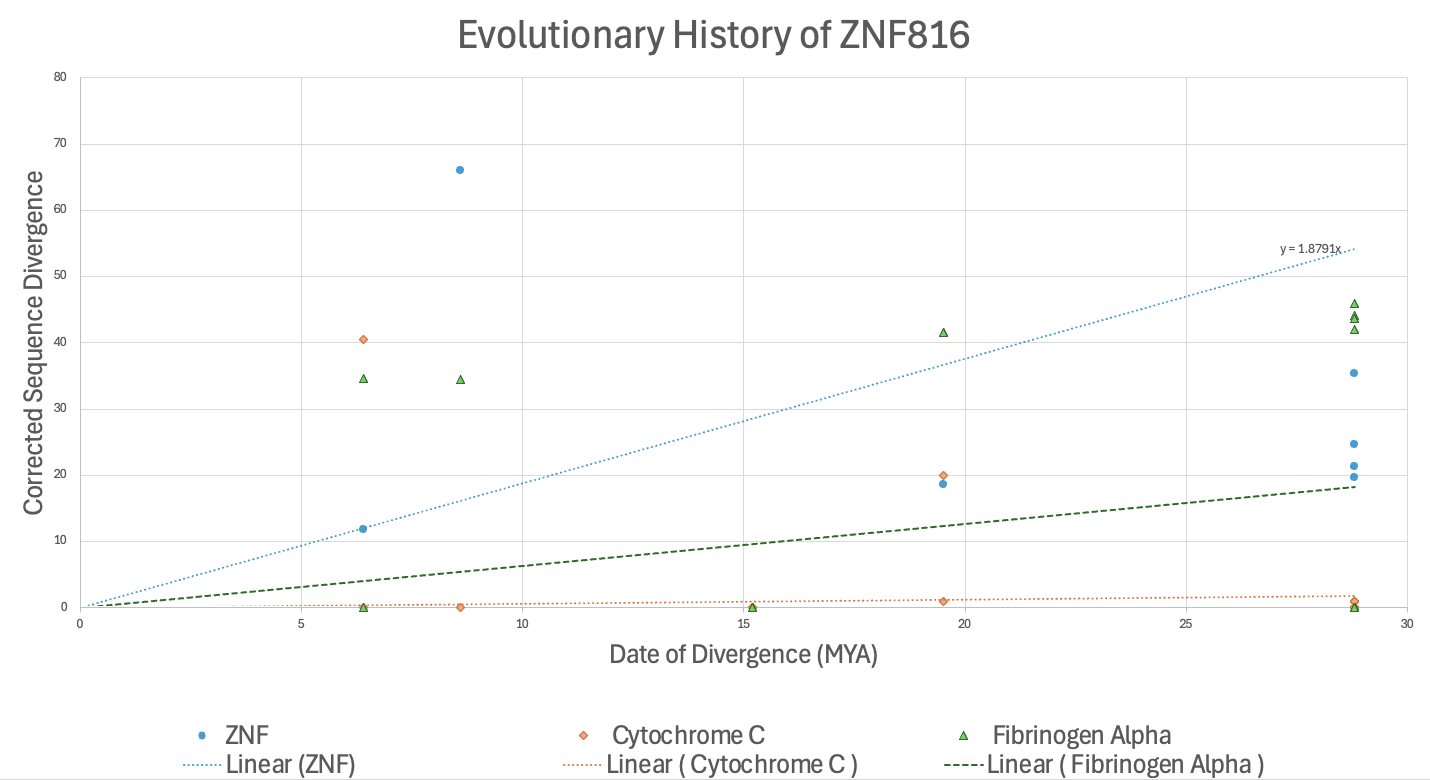
ZNF816 Evolutionary History comparing median Date of Divergence from Homo sapiens (millions of years) and Corrected Sequence Divergence for ZNF816, Cytochrome C, and Fibrinogen Alpha.

ZNF816 is evolving relatively slowly, as its rate of divergence is not significantly higher than that of Cytochrome C, a highly conserved protein, and is notably slower than proteins like Fibrinogen Alpha, indicating its functional conservation across species.

=== Distant homologs ===
While ZNF816 is not present in non-mammalian species, distant homologs containing its zinc finger domains can be found in other vertebrates, including birds and fish.

== Interacting proteins ==
ZNF816 interacts with several proteins involved in similar cellular processes. It binds with TRIM28, ZNF813, ZNF845, and ZNF468, all of which are linked to transcriptional regulation, indicating that ZNF816 likely plays a role in controlling gene expression. Additionally, CUL3, DCAF1, TRIM39, TRIM37, and RNF219 are involved in ubiquitination and protein degradation, suggesting that ZNF816 may help regulate protein turnover through the ubiquitin-proteasome pathway. TRIM28, TRIM39, and VPRBP are also associated with DNA repair, further supporting the idea that ZNF816 contributes to maintaining genomic stability. These interactions emphasize ZNF816's involvement in transcriptional regulation, protein degradation, and DNA repair.

== Clinical significance ==
Although direct disease associations are still being explored, ZNF816 is considered a potential candidate for diseases such as emphysema, MRKH syndrome, and early-onset psoriasis due to the relationship of the diseases to variants in the gene.
