= ZKSCAN5 =

Protein-coding gene in the species Homo sapiens

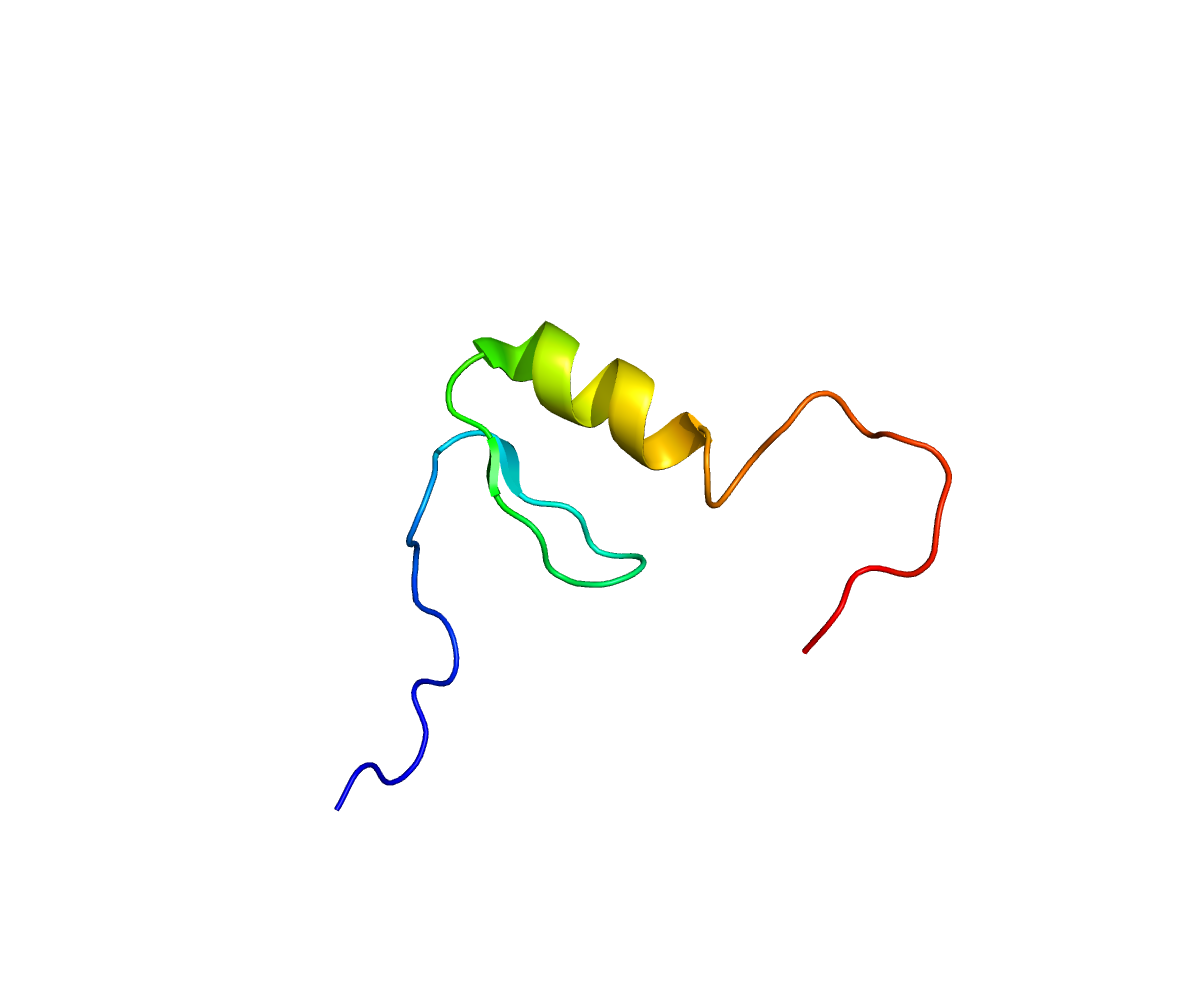

Identifiers
- Aliases: ZKSCAN5, ZFP95, ZNF914, ZSCAN37, ZFP-95, zinc finger with KRAB and SCAN domains 5
- External IDs: OMIM: 611272; MGI: 107533; GeneCards: ZKSCAN5
Available structures
PDB	Ortholog search: PDBe RCSB
PDB	List of PDB id codes 2EM5, 2EMM, 2EMZ, 2EN3, 2EOM, 2EON, 2EOO, 2YSO, 2YTG

Gene location (Human)
Chr.	Chromosome 7 (human)
Band	7q22.1	Start	99,504,662 bp
Band	7q22.1	End	99,534,700 bp

Gene location (Mouse)
Chr.	Chromosome 5 (mouse)
Band	5|5 G2	Start	145,141,372 bp
Band	5|5 G2	End	145,158,560 bp
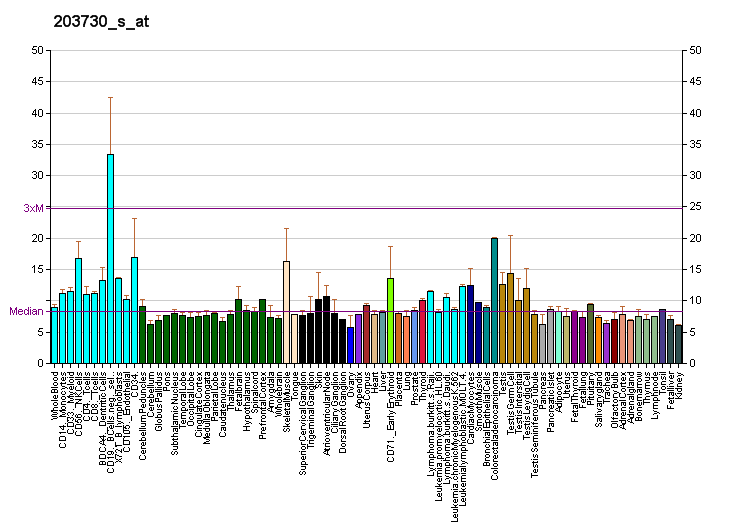

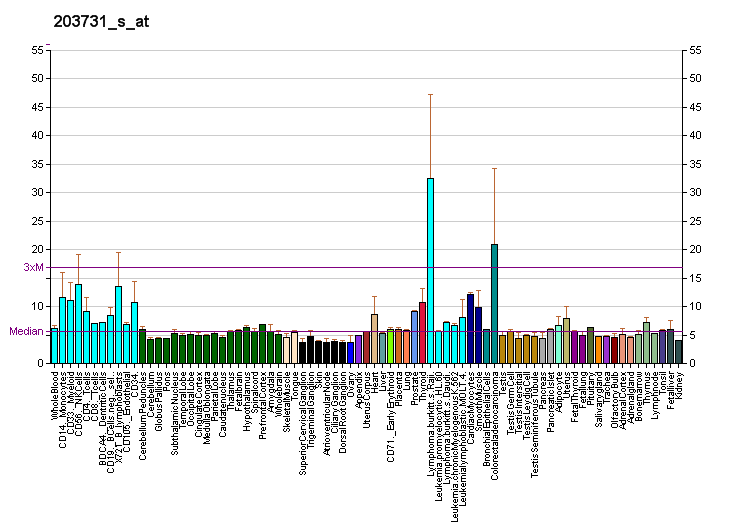
RNA expression pattern
Bgee	Human / Mouse (ortholog); Top expressed in: tendon of biceps brachii; gonad; testicle; ventricular zone; ganglionic eminence; sperm; stromal cell of endometrium; muscle of thigh; islet of Langerhans; gastrocnemius muscle / Top expressed in: secondary oocyte; spermatocyte; zygote; primary oocyte; ankle joint; seminiferous tubule; ventricular zone; genital tubercle; muscle of thigh; female urethra; More reference expression data
BioGPS	More reference expression data
Gene ontology
Molecular function	DNA binding; zinc ion binding; protein binding; metal ion binding; nucleic acid binding; DNA-binding transcription factor activity; DNA-binding transcription factor activity, RNA polymerase II-specific
Cellular component	intracellular anatomical structure; nucleus
Biological process	transcription, DNA-templated; regulation of transcription, DNA-templated; regulation of transcription by RNA polymerase II
Sources:Amigo / QuickGO
Orthologs
Databases	NCBI: entry; OMA: entry
Species	Human	Mouse
Entrez	23660	22757
Ensembl	ENSG00000196652	ENSMUSG00000055991
UniProt	Q9Y2L8	Q9Z1D8
RefSeq (mRNA)	NM_014569; NM_145102; NM_001318082; NM_001318083; NM_001318084	NM_001167944; NM_016683; NM_001359187; NM_001359188; NM_001359189 NM_001359190; NM_001359191; NM_001359192
RefSeq (protein)	NP_001305011; NP_001305012; NP_001305013; NP_055384; NP_659570	NP_001161416; NP_057892; NP_001346116; NP_001346117; NP_001346118 NP_001346119; NP_001346120; NP_001346121
Location (UCSC)	Chr 7: 99.5 – 99.53 Mb	Chr 5: 145.14 – 145.16 Mb
PubMed search
- Wikidata
View/Edit Human	View/Edit Mouse

Zinc finger protein with KRAB and SCAN domains 5 is a protein that in humans is encoded by the ZKSCAN5 gene. The protein contains a SCAN box and a KRAB A domain.

A similar protein in mice is differentially expressed in spermatogenesis. Two alternatively spliced transcript variants differing only in the five prime untranslated region (5' UTR) have been described. Additional variants have been found, but their full-length sequences have not been determined.
