= ZNF184 =

Protein-coding gene in the species Homo sapiens

Identifiers
- Aliases: ZNF184, kr-ZNF3, zinc finger protein 184
- External IDs: OMIM: 602277; MGI: 1922244; GeneCards: ZNF184

Gene location (Human)
Chr.	Chromosome 6 (human)
Band	6p22.1	Start	27,450,743 bp
Band	6p22.1	End	27,473,118 bp

Gene location (Mouse)
Chr.	Chromosome 13 (mouse)
Band	13|13 A3.1	Start	22,129,264 bp
Band	13|13 A3.1	End	22,144,949 bp
RNA expression pattern
Bgee	Human / Mouse (ortholog); Top expressed in: Brodmann area 23; sperm; hair follicle; middle temporal gyrus; endothelial cell; epithelium of nasopharynx; germinal epithelium; ganglionic eminence; gingival epithelium; gonad / Top expressed in: genital tubercle; spermatid; spermatocyte; tail of embryo; ventricular zone; hand; zygote; ganglionic eminence; embryo; secondary oocyte; More reference expression data
BioGPS	n/a
Gene ontology
Molecular function	DNA binding; zinc ion binding; metal ion binding; nucleic acid binding; DNA-binding transcription factor activity, RNA polymerase II-specific
Cellular component	intracellular anatomical structure; nucleus
Biological process	regulation of transcription, DNA-templated; transcription, DNA-templated; regulation of transcription by RNA polymerase II
Sources:Amigo / QuickGO
Orthologs
Databases	NCBI: entry; OMA: entry
Species	Human	Mouse
Entrez	7738	193452
Ensembl	ENSG00000096654	ENSMUSG00000006720
UniProt	Q99676	Q7TSH9
RefSeq (mRNA)	NM_007149; NM_001318891; NM_001318892; NM_001318893; NM_001347832	NM_183014; NM_001360886
RefSeq (protein)	NP_001305820; NP_001305821; NP_001305822; NP_001334761; NP_009080	NP_898835; NP_001347815
Location (UCSC)	Chr 6: 27.45 – 27.47 Mb	Chr 13: 22.13 – 22.14 Mb
PubMed search
- Wikidata
View/Edit Human	View/Edit Mouse

Zinc finger protein 184, also known as ZNF184, is a protein that in humans is encoded by the ZNF184 gene on chromosome 6. It was first identified by Goldwurm et al. in 1996.

The National Center for Biotechnology Information (NCBI) Gene database entry for ZNF184 identifies conserved domains KRAB_A (Krüppel associated box) near the N-terminus and Zn-finger (Zinc finger) at the C-terminus of the translated protein. The former is associated with transcription repression and the latter with DNA binding (see Zinc finger).

== Domains and Structure ==
The figure below is a reformatted and annotated conceptual translation display of ZNF184's Consensus CDS. CCDS displays exons in alternating black and blue font, with red indicating a residue coded across a splice boundary.

ZNF184 has 19 zinc finger motifs at the end of its final and longest exon. The figure shows regularity among the fingers in this protein, including the 2 columns of green-highlighted Cysteine residues and the 2 columns of blue-highlighted His residues which are the reason this type of zinc finger is called C2H2. Light grey highlighted columns (one with all F; one with mostly L, and F substitutions) are highly conserved hydrophobic residues within the zinc finger motif. The other light grey highlighted column (mostly K, with a similar R substitution) is an example of fairly strong conservation in the coil sections connecting adjacent fingers.

Near the N-terminus is a KRAB_A domain followed by a KRAB_B domain. KRAB_A has a shorter α-Helix followed by a longer α-Helix. The KRAB_A motif in a zinc finger protein is known to bind with a KAP-1 protein (a.k.a. TRIM28) to accomplish a transcription repressor function, however a gene so regulated by ZNF184 has yet to be identified. The length-11 finger helices are indicated, as well as the overlapping 7-residue section in each finger which binds targeted DNA (if the finger is functioning).

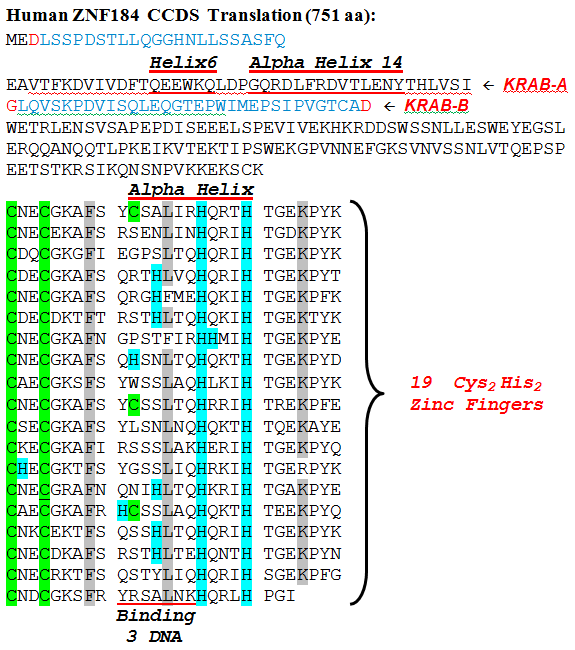
Reformatted Protein
