= TEKTIP1 =

Gene

Identifiers
- Aliases: TEKTIP1, chromosome 19 open reading frame 71, C19orf71, tektin bundle interacting protein 1
- External IDs: MGI: 1921072; HomoloGene: 47801; GeneCards: TEKTIP1; OMA:TEKTIP1 - orthologs

Gene location (Human)
Chr.	Chromosome 19 (human)
Band	19p13.3	Start	3,539,171 bp
Band	19p13.3	End	3,544,030 bp

Gene location (Mouse)
Chr.	Chromosome 10 (mouse)
Band	10|10 C1	Start	81,198,901 bp
Band	10|10 C1	End	81,201,650 bp
RNA expression pattern
Bgee	Human / Mouse (ortholog); Top expressed in: right testis; left testis; right hemisphere of cerebellum; right uterine tube; testicle; right lobe of thyroid gland; pituitary gland; left lobe of thyroid gland; granulocyte; anterior pituitary / Top expressed in: spermatid; spermatocyte; epithelium of stomach; granulocyte; morula; visual cortex; outer nuclear layer; yolk sac; esophagus; blastocyst; More reference expression data
BioGPS	n/a
Orthologs
Species	Human	Mouse
Entrez	100128569	432479
Ensembl	ENSG00000183397	ENSMUSG00000020234
UniProt	A6NCJ1	A6H6Q4
RefSeq (mRNA)	NM_001135580	NM_001014836
RefSeq (protein)	NP_001129052	NP_001014836
Location (UCSC)	Chr 19: 3.54 – 3.54 Mb	Chr 10: 81.2 – 81.2 Mb
PubMed search
- Wikidata
View/Edit Human	View/Edit Mouse

TEKTIP1, also known as tektin-bundle interacting protein 1, is a protein that in humans is encoded by the TEKTIP1 gene.

== Gene ==
Tektin bundle interacting protein 1 (TEKTIP1) is a protein which in humans is encoded by the TEKTIP1 mRNA. The longest mRNA produced is 826 bases long.

=== Aliases ===
Alias of the protein is C19orf71.

=== Locus ===
The TEKTIP1 gene is located at 19p13.3.

=== Transcriptional Regulation ===
Several predicted transcription factors may bind in the promoter region: TFDP1, PLAGL1, ZSCAN4, POU2F3.

=== Chemical Interactions ===
Acrylamide, cisplatin, and silicon dioxide decrease expression, while butanal (butyraldehyde), and pentanal increase expression of TEKTIP1 mRNA.

Sequence orthology also suggests that valproic acid increases methylation of TEKTIP1 mRNA.

== Protein ==
The mRNA of TEKTIP1 is 654 nucleotides long. It contains five exons. The human TEKTIP1 protein is 209 amino acids long and has a predicted molecular mass of 24.5 kDa. The human protein has a theoretical isoelectric point of 9.1.

=== Isoforms ===
There are two splice isoforms of the protein, X1 and X2.

X1 & X2 Isoform Orthologs
X1	X2
Tibetan macaque	Chimpanzee
Olive baboon	Olive baboon
Panamanian white-faced capuchin	Common marmoset
Golden and Black snub-nosed monkeys	Golden sub-nosed monkey
Elk	Elk
Red deer	Red deer
Greater horseshoe bat	Bats
Red fox	Polar bear

== Characteristics & structure ==
TEKTIP1 is highly enriched in tryptophan and tyrosine. Additionally, the protein is semi-enriched in arginine and proline.

== Expression ==
TEKTIP1 is tissue specific and is found in higher levels in the kidney, testis and thymus.

In fetal development, it is found in higher levels in the Adrenal glands during weeks 16–20.

TEKTIP1 protein is said to be specific to the testis and is found in early spermatids during spermatogenesis.

== Evolution ==
=== Orthologs ===
Over 240 organisms have orthologs with human gene TEKTIP1. The most distant organism with an orthologous sequence to human TEKTIP1 is the West African lungfish (estimated date of divergence of 408 MYA).

Selected Orthologs for TEKTIP1
Genus and species	Common name	Taxonomic group	Median Date of Divergence (MYA)	Accession #	Sequence length (aa)	Sequence identity to human protein %	Sequence similarity to Human Protein %
Homo sapiens	Human	Primates/Hominidae	0	NP_001129052.1	209	100	100
Pan troglodyte	Chimpanzee	Primates	6.4	XP_003316050.1	209	98.1	98.6
Mus musculus	Mouse	Rodentia	87	NP_001014836.2	217	45.6	60.4
Bos taurus	Cow	Artiodactyla	94	NP_001070550	208	76.6	84.2
Panthera tigris	Tiger	Carnivora	94	XP_042833719.1	210	34.1	38.9
Orcinus orca	Killer whale	Cetacea	94	XP_012394771.2	216	63	73.1
Phascolarctos cinereus	Koala	Diprodontia	160	XP_020824948.1	211	52.9	67.4
Haliaeetus leucocephalus	Bald Eagle	Accipitiformes	319	XP_010580112.1	206	41.4	52
Dromaius novaehollandiae	Emu	Aves	319	XP_025961204.1	190	44.8	56.7
Gallus gallus domesticus	Chicken	Aves	319	XP_015155269.2	188	38.2	48.4
Crocodylus porosus	Saltwater Crocodile	Crocodilia	319	XP_019406144.1	210	54.3	68.3
Caretta caretta	Loggerhead Sea Turtle	Testudines	319	XP_048687032.1	216	47.8	57.3
Zootoca vivipara	Common lizard	Squamata	319	XP_034975173.1	200	48.8	59.5
Crotalus tigris	Tiger Rattlesnake	Squamata	319	XP_039190693.1	199	45.8	57.5
Protobothrops mucrosquamatus	Venomous Pit Viper	Squamata	319	XP_015665555.1	199	45.1	56.7
Bufo bufo	Common Toad	Salientia	353	XP_040276375	136	24.7	34.3
Geotrypetes seraphini	Gaboon Caecilian	Caecilians	353	XP_033813379.1	156	36.1	45.8
Microcaecilia unicolor	Tiny Caecilian	Caecilians	353	XP_030074922.1	142	34.3	42.6
Protopterus annectens	West African Lungfish	Actinopterygii	408	XP_043910031.1	142	28.6	39
