= ZNF10 =

Protein-coding gene in the species Homo sapiens

Identifiers
- Aliases: ZNF10, KOX1, zinc finger protein 10
- External IDs: OMIM: 194538; GeneCards: ZNF10

Gene location (Human)
Chr.	Chromosome 12 (human)
Band	12q24.33	Start	133,130,575 bp
Band	12q24.33	End	133,159,465 bp
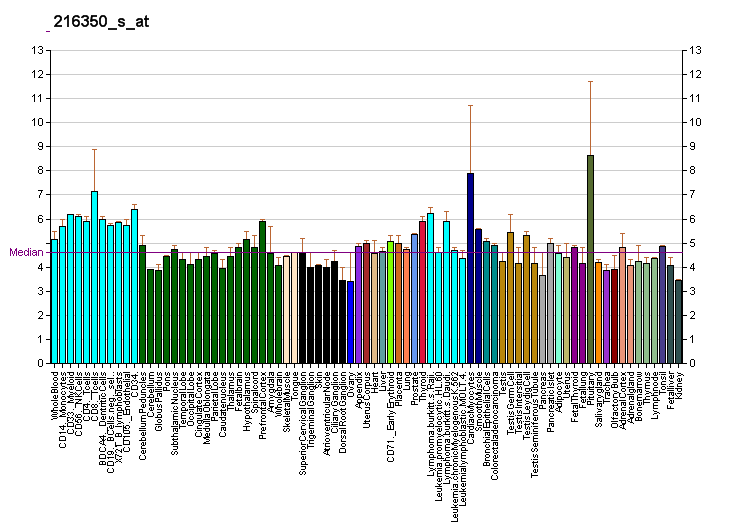
RNA expression pattern
Bgee	Human / Mouse (ortholog); Top expressed in: anterior pituitary; testicle; right lobe of thyroid gland; left lobe of thyroid gland; gonad; left ovary; right uterine tube; right ovary; body of pancreas; gastric mucosa / n/a; More reference expression data
BioGPS	More reference expression data
Gene ontology
Molecular function	DNA binding; protein binding; metal ion binding; nucleic acid binding; DNA-binding transcription factor activity, RNA polymerase II-specific
Cellular component	intracellular anatomical structure; nucleus
Biological process	regulation of transcription, DNA-templated; transcription, DNA-templated; regulation of transcription by RNA polymerase II
Sources:Amigo / QuickGO
Orthologs
Databases	NCBI: entry; OMA: entry
Species	Human	Mouse
Entrez	7556	n/a
Ensembl	ENSG00000256223	n/a
UniProt	P21506	n/a
RefSeq (mRNA)	NM_015394	n/a
RefSeq (protein)	NP_056209	n/a
Location (UCSC)	Chr 12: 133.13 – 133.16 Mb	n/a
PubMed search		n/a
- Wikidata
View/Edit Human

Zinc finger protein 10 is a protein that in humans is encoded by the ZNF10 gene.

== Function ==
The protein encoded by this gene contains a C2H2 zinc finger, and has been shown to function as a transcriptional repressor. The Kruppel-associated box (KRAB) domain of this protein is found to be responsible for its transcriptional repression activity. RING finger containing protein TIF1 was reported to interact with the KRAB domain, and may serve as a mediator for the repression activity of this protein.

== Interactions ==
ZNF10 has been shown to interact with TRIM28.
