= ZNF43 =

Protein-coding gene in the species Homo sapiens

Identifiers
- Aliases: ZNF43, HTF6, KOX27, ZNF39L1, zinc finger protein 43
- External IDs: OMIM: 603972; MGI: 3040691; GeneCards: ZNF43

Gene location (Human)
Chr.	Chromosome 19 (human)
Band	19p12	Start	21,804,946 bp
Band	19p12	End	21,852,125 bp

Gene location (Mouse)
Chr.	Chromosome 13 (mouse)
Band	13 B3|13 34.54 cM	Start	67,254,918 bp
Band	13 B3|13 34.54 cM	End	67,278,466 bp
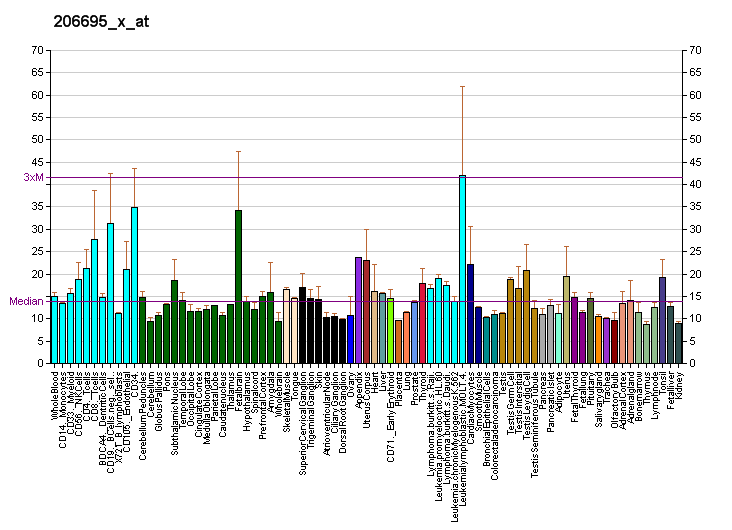

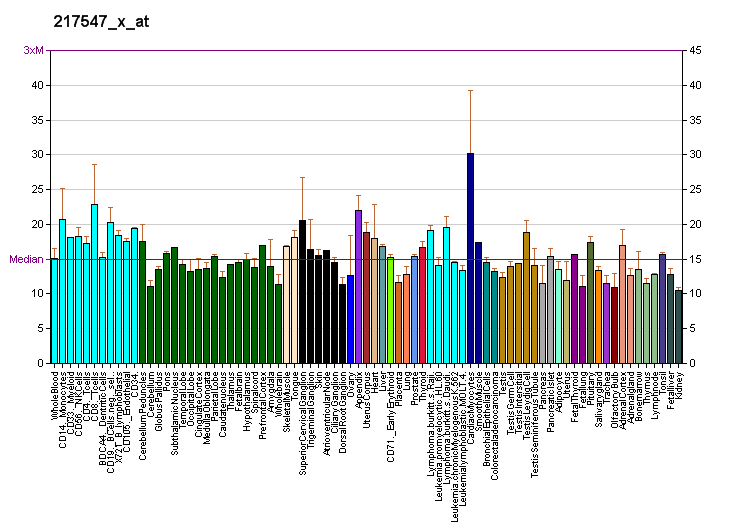

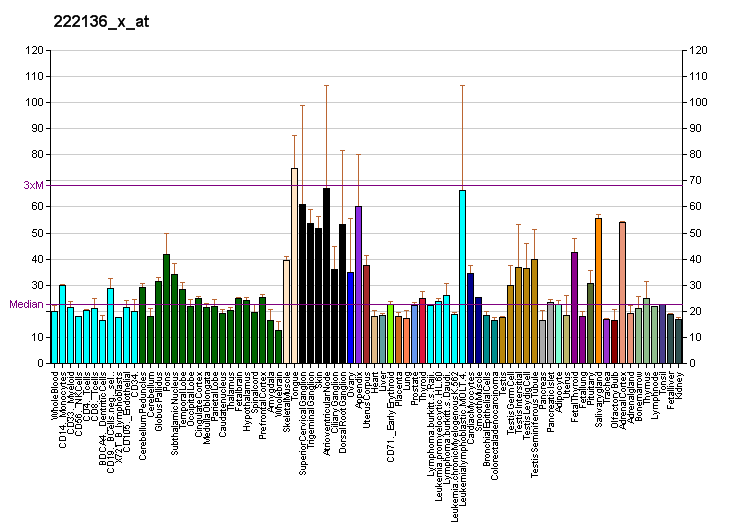
RNA expression pattern
Bgee	Human / Mouse (ortholog); Top expressed in: Achilles tendon; ganglionic eminence; ventricular zone; corpus callosum; testicle; bone marrow cell; gonad; endometrium; epithelium of colon; tonsil / Top expressed in: Rostral migratory stream; lumbar subsegment of spinal cord; tail of embryo; genital tubercle; vestibular membrane of cochlear duct; Region I of hippocampus proper; ganglionic eminence; vas deferens; transitional epithelium of urinary bladder; embryo; More reference expression data
BioGPS	More reference expression data
Gene ontology
Molecular function	DNA-binding transcription factor activity; DNA binding; metal ion binding; nucleic acid binding; DNA-binding transcription factor activity, RNA polymerase II-specific
Cellular component	intracellular anatomical structure; nucleus
Biological process	regulation of transcription, DNA-templated; transcription, DNA-templated; regulation of transcription by RNA polymerase II
Sources:Amigo / QuickGO
Orthologs
Databases	NCBI: entry; OMA: entry
Species	Human	Mouse
Entrez	7594	238690
Ensembl	ENSG00000198521; ENSG00000279566	ENSMUSG00000055480
UniProt	P17038	Q6P5C7
RefSeq (mRNA)	NM_001256648; NM_001256649; NM_001256650; NM_001256651; NM_001256653 NM_001256654; NM_003423	NM_001001152
RefSeq (protein)	NP_001243577; NP_001243578; NP_001243579; NP_001243580; NP_001243582 NP_001243583; NP_003414; NP_001243577.1; NP_001243578.1; NP_001243579.1	NP_001001152
Location (UCSC)	Chr 19: 21.8 – 21.85 Mb	Chr 13: 67.25 – 67.28 Mb
PubMed search
- Wikidata
View/Edit Human	View/Edit Mouse

Zinc finger protein 43 is a protein that in humans is encoded by the ZNF43 gene.

== Function ==
This gene belongs to the C2H2-type zinc finger gene family. The zinc finger proteins are involved in gene regulation and development, and are quite conserved throughout evolution. Like this gene product, a third of the zinc finger proteins containing C2H2 fingers also contain the KRAB domain, which has been found to be involved in protein-protein interactions.

== See also ==
- Zinc finger
