= NKG7 =

Protein-coding gene in the species Homo sapiens

Identifiers
- Aliases: NKG7, GIG1, GMP-17, p15-TIA-1, natural killer cell granule protein 7
- External IDs: OMIM: 606008; MGI: 1931250; HomoloGene: 4092; GeneCards: NKG7; OMA:NKG7 - orthologs

Gene location (Human)
Chr.	Chromosome 19 (human)
Band	19q13.41	Start	51,371,606 bp
Band	19q13.41	End	51,372,701 bp

Gene location (Mouse)
Chr.	Chromosome 7 (mouse)
Band	7|7 B3	Start	43,086,497 bp
Band	7|7 B3	End	43,087,673 bp
RNA expression pattern
Bgee	Human / Mouse (ortholog); Top expressed in: granulocyte; testicle; blood; bone marrow; spleen; bone marrow cell; mononuclear cell; monocyte; trabecular bone; lymph node / Top expressed in: tibiofemoral joint; blood; mesenteric lymph nodes; granulocyte; spleen; embryo; thymus; bone marrow; intestinal villus; gastrula; More reference expression data
BioGPS	n/a
Orthologs
Species	Human	Mouse
Entrez	4818	72310
Ensembl	ENSG00000105374	ENSMUSG00000004612
UniProt	Q16617	Q99PA5
RefSeq (mRNA)	NM_005601; NM_001363693	NM_024253
RefSeq (protein)	NP_005592; NP_001350622	n/a
Location (UCSC)	Chr 19: 51.37 – 51.37 Mb	Chr 7: 43.09 – 43.09 Mb
PubMed search
- Wikidata
View/Edit Human	View/Edit Mouse

Natural killer cell granule protein 7 (NKG7 protein) is a protein that in humans is encoded by the NKG7 gene. The protein is under study regarding potential in cancer research into T cell activity. A role of the NKG7 protein in regulating cell resistance and fighting tumors in certain types of cancer is being studied because of its ability to recognize and kill cancer cells through CD8+ T cell resilience that is essential for anti-tumor activity. The research suggests that the NKG7 protein allows the CD8+ T cells to continue killing malignant cells in certain circumstances and may prevent growth and metastasis of the malignant cells being attacked by the CD8+ T cells.
