= Zinc finger and scan domain containing 4 =

Protein found in humans

ZSCAN4

Identifiers
- Aliases: ZSCAN4, ZNF494, zinc finger and SCAN domain containing 4
- External IDs: OMIM: 613419; MGI: 3708485; GeneCards: ZSCAN4

Gene location (Human)
Chr.	Chromosome 19 (human)
Band	19q13.43	Start	57,668,935 bp
Band	19q13.43	End	57,679,152 bp

Gene location (Mouse)
Chr.	Chromosome 7 (mouse)
Band	7|7 A1	Start	11,131,842 bp
Band	7|7 A1	End	11,136,245 bp
RNA expression pattern
Bgee	Human / Mouse (ortholog); Top expressed in: placenta; apex of heart; olfactory zone of nasal mucosa; right uterine tube; skin of abdomen; urinary bladder; skin of leg; minor salivary glands; skin of hip; body of stomach / Top expressed in: zygote; secondary oocyte; epiblast; spleen; lung; More reference expression data
BioGPS	n/a
Gene ontology
Molecular function	DNA binding; metal ion binding; nucleic acid binding; DNA-binding transcription factor activity; DNA-binding transcription factor activity, RNA polymerase II-specific
Cellular component	telomere; chromosome; nucleus
Biological process	telomere maintenance via telomere lengthening; regulation of transcription, DNA-templated; transcription, DNA-templated; negative regulation of mitotic recombination; regulation of transcription by RNA polymerase II
Sources:Amigo / QuickGO
Orthologs
Databases	NCBI: entry; OMA: entry
Species	Human	Mouse
Entrez	201516	665902
Ensembl	ENSG00000180532	ENSMUSG00000070828
UniProt	Q8NAM6	Q3URS2
RefSeq (mRNA)	NM_152677; NM_001384833	NM_001110316
RefSeq (protein)	NP_689890	NP_001103786
Location (UCSC)	Chr 19: 57.67 – 57.68 Mb	Chr 7: 11.13 – 11.14 Mb
PubMed search
- Wikidata
View/Edit Human	View/Edit Mouse

Zinc finger and SCAN domain containing 4 is a protein that in humans is encoded by the ZSCAN4 gene.

== Function ==
The ZSCAN4 gene encodes a protein involved in telomere maintenance and with a key role in the critical feature of mouse embryonic stem cells, namely, defying cellular senescence and maintaining normal karyotype for many cell divisions in culture.
