= Krüppel associated box =

Protein domain

Krüppel Associated Box
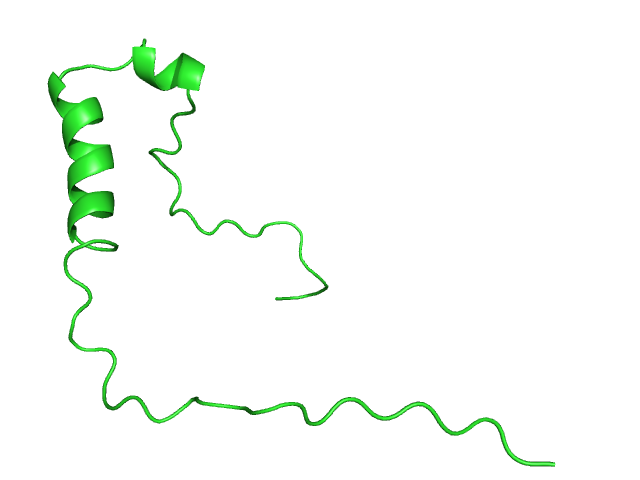
- KRAB domain

Identifiers
- Symbol: KRAB
- Pfam: PF01352
- InterPro: IPR001909
- SMART: SM00349
- PROSITE: PS50805
- SCOP2: 1v65 / SCOPe / SUPFAM
Available protein structures:
- PDB: 1v65A:8-48 IPR001909 PF01352 (ECOD; PDBsum)
- AlphaFold: IPR001909; PF01352

The Krüppel associated box (KRAB) domain is a category of transcriptional repression domains present in approximately 400 human zinc finger protein-based transcription factors (KRAB zinc finger proteins). The KRAB domain typically consists of about 75 amino acid residues, while the minimal repression module is approximately 45 amino acid residues. It is predicted to function through protein-protein interactions via two amphipathic helices. The most prominent interacting protein is called TRIM28 initially visualized as SMP1, cloned as KAP1 and TIF1-beta. Substitutions for the conserved residues abolish repression.

Over 10 independently encoded KRAB domains have been shown to be effective repressors of transcription, suggesting this activity to be a common property of the domain. KRAB domains can be fused with dCas9 CRISPR tools to form even stronger repressors. While the KRAB domain from KOX1 (ZNF10) was the first to be functionally characterized and widely used in CRISPRi, a systematic screen of 57 human KRAB domains identified the domain from ZIM3 as a significantly more potent repressor. The ZIM3 KRAB domain exhibits stronger recruitment of the co-repressors TRIM28 and HP1α, leading to more complete gene silencing and improved performance in genome-wide screens compared to traditional KOX1-based tools.

== Evolution ==
The KRAB domain had initially been identified in 1988 as a periodic array of leucine residues separated by six amino acids 5’ to the zinc finger region of KOX1/ZNF10 coined heptad repeat of leucines (also known as a leucine zipper). Later, this domain was named in association with the Cys_{2}His_{2}-Zinc finger proteins Krüppel associated box (KRAB). The KRAB domain is confined to genomes from tetrapod organisms. The KRAB containing Cys_{2}His_{2}-ZNF genes constitute the largest sub-family of zinc finger genes. More than half of the Cys_{2}His_{2}-ZNF genes are associated with a KRAB domain in the human genome. They are more prone to clustering and are found in large clusters on the human genome.

The KRAB domain presents one of the strongest repressors in the human genome. Once the KRAB domain was fused to the tetracycline repressor (TetR), the TetR-KRAB fusion proteins were the first engineered drug-inducible repressor that worked in mammalian cells. Two distinct types of KRAB A domains can be structurally and functionally distinguished. Ancestral KRAB A domains present in human PDRM9 proteins are even evolutionary conserved in mussel genomes. Modern KRAB A domain sequences are found in coelacanth latimeria chalumnae and in Lungfish genomes.

== Examples ==
Human genes encoding KRAB-ZFPs include KOX1/ZNF10, KOX8/ZNF708, ZNF43, ZNF184, ZNF91, HPF4, HTF10 and HTF34.
