= TRIM28 =

Protein-coding gene in the species Homo sapiens

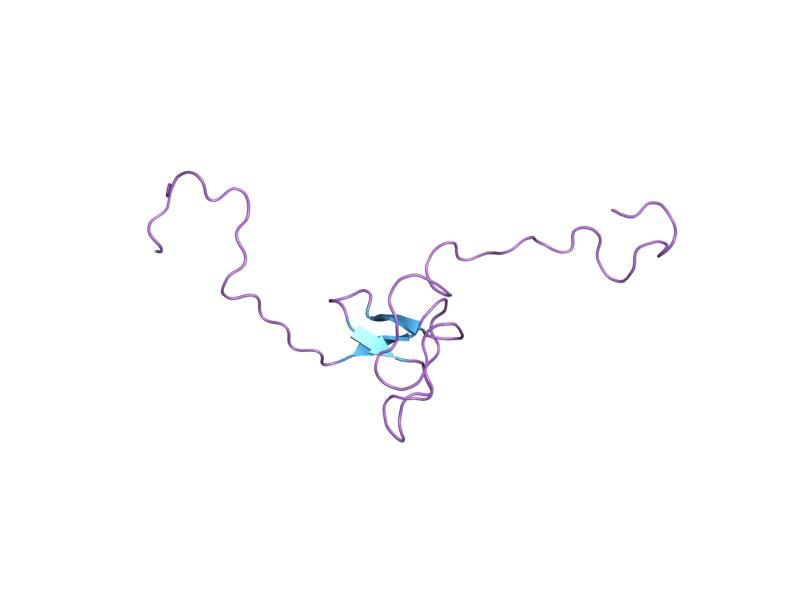

Identifiers
- Aliases: TRIM28, KAP1, PPP1R157, RNF96, TF1B, TIF1B, tripartite motif containing 28, TIF1beta
- External IDs: OMIM: 601742; MGI: 109274; GeneCards: TRIM28
Available structures
PDB	Ortholog search: PDBe RCSB
PDB	List of PDB id codes 1FP0, 2RO1, 2YVR
Enzyme activity
EC #	BRENDA	ExPASy	KEGG	MetaCyc
2.3.2.27	↗	↗	↗	↗

Gene location (Human)
Chr.	Chromosome 19 (human)
Band	19q13.43	Start	58,544,064 bp
Band	19q13.43	End	58,550,722 bp

Gene location (Mouse)
Chr.	Chromosome 7 (mouse)
Band	7|7 A1	Start	12,733,041 bp
Band	7|7 A1	End	12,764,962 bp
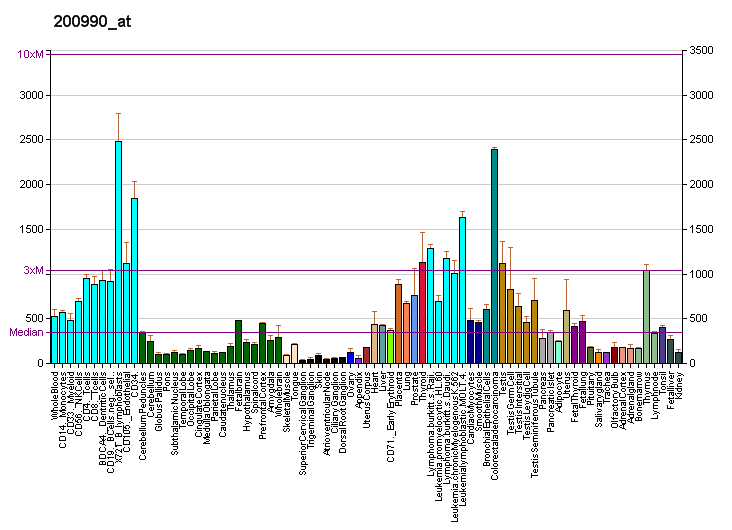
RNA expression pattern
Bgee	Human / Mouse (ortholog); Top expressed in: left testis; right testis; ventricular zone; ganglionic eminence; stromal cell of endometrium; left ovary; right ovary; body of uterus; gonad; right uterine tube / Top expressed in: epiblast; spermatocyte; spermatid; ventricular zone; internal carotid artery; somite; morula; blastocyst; genital tubercle; tail of embryo; More reference expression data
BioGPS	More reference expression data
Gene ontology
Molecular function	protein kinase activity; Krueppel-associated box domain binding; chromo shadow domain binding; transcription corepressor activity; promoter-specific chromatin binding; transcription coactivator activity; metal ion binding; ubiquitin-protein transferase activity; protein binding; ubiquitin protein ligase binding; DNA-binding transcription factor activity; sequence-specific DNA binding; DNA binding; chromatin binding; zinc ion binding; RNA binding; transferase activity; SUMO transferase activity
Cellular component	intracellular anatomical structure; chromatin; RNA polymerase II transcription regulator complex; nucleus; nucleoplasm
Biological process	regulation of transcription, DNA-templated; positive regulation of DNA methylation-dependent heterochromatin assembly; convergent extension involved in axis elongation; embryonic placenta morphogenesis; positive regulation of DNA repair; in utero embryonic development; negative regulation of transcription by RNA polymerase II; transcription, DNA-templated; negative regulation of DNA demethylation; protein phosphorylation; protein complex oligomerization; protein autophosphorylation; DNA methylation involved in embryo development; Ras protein signal transduction; transcription initiation from RNA polymerase II promoter; DNA repair; embryo implantation; positive regulation of transcription by RNA polymerase II; regulation of genetic imprinting; protein sumoylation; epithelial to mesenchymal transition; protein ubiquitination; negative regulation of transcription, DNA-templated; positive regulation of transcription, DNA-templated; positive regulation of DNA binding; innate immune response; negative regulation of single stranded viral RNA replication via double stranded DNA intermediate; chromatin organization; viral process; positive regulation of protein import into nucleus
Sources:Amigo / QuickGO
Orthologs
Databases	NCBI: entry; OMA: entry
Species	Human	Mouse
Entrez	10155	21849
Ensembl	ENSG00000130726	ENSMUSG00000005566
UniProt	Q13263	Q62318
RefSeq (mRNA)	NM_005762	NM_011588
RefSeq (protein)	NP_005753	NP_035718
Location (UCSC)	Chr 19: 58.54 – 58.55 Mb	Chr 7: 12.73 – 12.76 Mb
PubMed search
- Wikidata
View/Edit Human	View/Edit Mouse

Tripartite motif-containing 28 (TRIM28), also known as transcriptional intermediary factor 1β (TIF1β) and KRAB-associated protein-1 (KAP1), is a protein that in humans is encoded by the TRIM28 gene.

== Function ==
The protein encoded by this gene mediates transcriptional regulation by interacting with the Krüppel-associated box (KRAB) repression domain found in many transcription factors. The protein localizes to the nucleus and is thought to associate with specific chromatin regions. TRIM28 is a member of the tripartite motif family. This tripartite motif includes three zinc-binding domains, a RING finger domain, a B-box type 1 and a B-box type 2, and a coiled-coil region. TRIM28 additionally possesses a domain that interacts with heterochromatin protein 1 (HP1) and a bromodomain capable of recognizing acetylated lysine residues in other proteins.

TRIM28/KAP1 is a ubiquitously expressed protein involved in many critical functions including: transcriptional regulation, cellular differentiation and proliferation, DNA damage repair, viral suppression, and apoptosis. Its functionality is dependent upon post-translational modifications. SUMOylated TRIM28 can assemble epigenetic machinery for gene silencing, while phosphorylated TRIM28 is involved in DNA repair.

=== Cellular differentiation and proliferation ===
Studies have shown that deletion of TRIM28/KAP1 in mice before gastrulation results in death (implicating it as a necessary protein in early development) while deletion in adult mice results in increased anxiety and stress-induced alterations in learning and memory. KAP1 has been shown to participate in the maintenance of pluripotency of embryonic stem cells and to promote and inhibit cellular differentiation of adult cell lines. Increased levels of KAP1 have been found in liver, gastric, breast, lung, and prostate cancers as well, indicating that it may play an important role in tumor cell proliferation (possibly by inhibiting apoptosis).

=== Transcriptional regulation ===
KAP1 can regulate genomic transcription through a variety of mechanisms, many of which remain somewhat unclear. Studies have shown that KAP1 can repress transcription by binding directly to the genome (which can be sufficient in and of itself) or through the induction of heterochromatin formation via the Mi2α-SETDB1-HP1 macromolecular complex. KAP1 recruits and interacts directly with the histone methyltransferase SETDB1 and with histone deacetylases via its C-terminal PHD finger and bromodomain. It thus functions as a bridge between sequence-specific DNA-binding KRAB-ZFP transcription factors and various histone-modifying proteins responsible for silencing transcription via nucleosome remodeling, allowing precise epigenetic changes to be made at specific loci across the genome.

=== DNA damage repair response ===
It has been shown that the kinase ATM phosphorylates KAP1 upon the discovery of damaged or broken DNA. Phosphorylated KAP1, along with many other DNA damage proteins, rapidly migrate to the site of the DNA damage. Its exact involvement in this pathway is somewhat unclear, but it has been implicated in triggering cell arrest, allowing for the damaged DNA to be repaired.

=== Apoptosis ===
KAP1 forms a complex with MDM2 (a ubiquitin E3 ligase) that binds to p53. This complex marks the bound p53 for degradation by proteasomes. p53 is a known precursor of apoptosis that facilitates the synthesis of proteins necessary for cell death, so its degradation accordingly results in apoptosis inhibition.

== Clinical significance ==
=== Role in the establishment of viral latency ===
KAP1 facilitates the establishment of viral latency in certain cell types for Human Cytomegalovirus (HCMV) and other endogenous retroviruses. KAP1 acts as a transcriptional corepressor of the viral genome. The protein binds to the histones of the viral chromatin and then recruits Mi2α and SETDB1. SETDB1 is a histone methyltransferase that recruits HP1, thus inducing heterochromatin formation and preventing the transcription of the viral genome. mTOR has been implicated in the phosphorylation of KAP1, resulting in a switch from latency to the lytic cycle.

=== Manipulations and potential for future treatment ===
Ataxia telangiectasia mutated (ATM) is a kinase that (similar to mTOR) can phosphorylate KAP1, resulting in the switch from viral latency to the lytic cycle. Chloroquine, an ATM activator, has been shown to result in increases in transcription of the HCMV genome. This effect is augmented by the use of tumor necrosis factor. It has been proposed that this treatment (accompanied by antiretroviral treatment) has the potential to purge the virus from infected individuals.

== Interactions ==
TRIM28/KAP1 has been shown to interact with:

- CBX5
- CEBPB
- Glucocorticoid receptor
- SETDB1
- ZNF10
- BMAL1

== See also ==
- Transcription coregulator
