= RING finger domain =

Zinc finger, C3HC4 type (RING finger)
- Structure of the C3HC4 domain. Zinc ions are black spheres, coordinated by cysteines residues (blue).

Identifiers
- Symbol: zf-C3HC4
- Pfam: PF00097
- Pfam clan: CL0229
- ECOD: 376.1.1
- InterPro: IPR001841
- SMART: SM00184
- PROSITE: PDOC00449
- SCOP2: 1chc / SCOPe / SUPFAM
Available protein structures:
- PDB: IPR001841 PF00097 (ECOD; PDBsum)
- AlphaFold: IPR001841; PF00097

In molecular biology, a RING (short for Really Interesting New Gene) finger domain is a protein structural domain of zinc finger type which contains a C_{3}HC_{4} amino acid motif which binds two zinc cations (seven cysteines and one histidine arranged non-consecutively). This protein domain contains 40 to 60 amino acids. Many proteins containing a RING finger play a key role in the ubiquitination pathway. Conversely, proteins with RING finger domains are the largest type of ubiquitin ligases in the human genome.

== Zinc fingers ==
Zinc finger (Znf) domains are relatively small protein motifs that bind one or more zinc atoms, and which usually contain multiple finger-like protrusions that make tandem contacts with their target molecule. They bind DNA, RNA, protein and/or lipid substrates. Their binding properties depend on the amino acid sequence of the finger domains and of the linker between fingers, as well as on the higher-order structures and the number of fingers. Znf domains are often found in clusters, where fingers can have different binding specificities. There are many superfamilies of Znf motifs, varying in both sequence and structure. They display considerable versatility in binding modes, even between members of the same class (e.g. some bind DNA, others protein), suggesting that Znf motifs are stable scaffolds that have evolved specialised functions. For example, Znf-containing proteins function in gene transcription, translation, mRNA trafficking, cytoskeleton organisation, epithelial development, cell adhesion, protein folding, chromatin remodelling and zinc sensing. Zinc-binding motifs are stable structures, and they rarely undergo conformational changes upon binding their target.

Some Zn finger domains have diverged such that they still maintain their core structure, but have lost their ability to bind zinc, using other means such as salt bridges or binding to other metals to stabilise the finger-like folds.

== Function ==
Many RING finger domains simultaneously bind ubiquitination enzymes and their substrates and hence function as ligases. Ubiquitination in turn targets the substrate protein for degradation.

=== Meiotic recombination ===
During meiosis, crossing over between homologous chromosomes (homologs) promotes accurate chromosome segregation. In mammals, the ring-domain proteins RNF212, HEI10 and RNF212B facilitate crossing over between each pair of homologs during meiosis. Studies in the mouse showed that these pro-crossover ring-domain proteins have distinct, but interdependent functions, in facilitating the homologous recombination and DNA repair processes that produce crossovers.

== Structure ==
The RING finger domain has the consensus sequence C-X_{2}-C-X_{[9-39]}-C-X_{[1-3]}-H-X_{[2-3]}-C-X_{2}-C-X_{[4-48]}-C-X_{2}-C. where:

- C is a conserved cysteine residue involved zinc coordination,
- H is a conserved histidine involved in zinc coordination,
- Zn is zinc atom, and
- X is any amino acid residue.

The following is a schematic representation of the structure of the RING finger domain:

Schematic representation of the sequence of the RING finger domain (after Borden et al., modified)

== Examples ==
Examples of human genes which encode proteins containing a RING finger domain include:

AMFR, BARD1, BBAP, BFAR, BIRC2, BIRC3, BIRC7, BIRC8, BMI1, BRAP, BRCA1, CBL, CBLB, CBLC, CBLL1, CHFR, CNOT4, COMMD3, DTX1, DTX2, DTX3, DTX3L, DTX4, DZIP3, HCGV, HLTF, HOIL-1, IRF2BP2, LNX1, LNX2, LONRF1, LONRF2, LONRF3, MARCH1, MARCH2, MARCH3, MARCH4, MARCH5, MARCH6, MARCH7, MARCH8, MARCH9, MARCH10, MDM2, MEX3A, MEX3B, MEX3C, MEX3D, MGRN1, MIB1, MID1, MID2, MKRN1, MKRN2, MKRN3, MKRN4, MNAT1, MYLIP, NFX1, NFX2, PCGF1, PCGF2, PCGF3, PCGF4, PCGF5, PCGF6, PDZRN3, PDZRN4, PEX10, PHRF1, PJA1, PJA2, PML, PML-RAR, PXMP3, RAD18, RAG1, RAPSN, RBCK1, RBX1, RC3H1, RC3H2, RCHY1, RFP2, RFPL1, RFPL2, RFPL3, RFPL4B, RFWD2, RFWD3, RING1, RNF2, RNF4, RNF5, RNF6, RNF7, RNF8, RNF10, RNF11, RNF12, RNF13, RNF14, RNF19A, RNF20, RNF24, RNF25, RNF26, RNF32, RNF38, RNF39, RNF40, RNF41, RNF43, RNF44, RNF55, RNF71, RNF103, RNF111, RNF113A, RNF113B, RNF121, RNF122, RNF123, RNF125, RNF126, RNF128, RNF130, RNF133, RNF135, RNF138, RNF139, RNF141, RNF144A, RNF145, RNF146, RNF148, RNF149, RNF150, RNF151, RNF152, RNF157, RNF165, RNF166, RNF167, RNF168, RNF169, RNF170, RNF175, RNF180, RNF181, RNF182, RNF185, RNF207, RNF213, RNF215, RNFT1, SH3MD4, SH3RF1, SH3RF2, SYVN1, TIF1, TMEM118, TOPORS, TRAF2, TRAF3, TRAF4, TRAF5, TRAF6, TRAF7, TRAIP, TRIM2, TRIM3, TRIM4, TRIM5, TRIM6, TRIM7, TRIM8, TRIM9, TRIM10, TRIM11, TRIM13, TRIM15, TRIM17, TRIM21, TRIM22, TRIM23, TRIM24, TRIM25, TRIM26, TRIM27, TRIM28, TRIM31, TRIM32, TRIM33, TRIM34, TRIM35, TRIM36, TRIM38, TRIM39, TRIM40, TRIM41, TRIM42, TRIM43, TRIM45, TRIM46, TRIM47, TRIM48, TRIM49, TRIM50, TRIM52, TRIM54, TRIM55, TRIM56, TRIM58, TRIM59, TRIM60, TRIM61, TRIM62, TRIM63, TRIM65, TRIM67, TRIM68, TRIM69, TRIM71, TRIM72, TRIM73, TRIM74, TRIML1, TTC3, UHRF1, UHRF2, VPS11, VPS8, ZNF179, ZNF294, ZNF313, ZNF364, ZNF451, ZNF650, ZNFB7, ZNRF1, ZNRF2, ZNRF3, ZNRF4, and ZSWIM2.
