= FASTKD1 =

Protein-coding gene in the species Homo sapiens

Identifiers
- Aliases: FASTKD1, FAST kinase domains 1
- External IDs: OMIM: 617529; MGI: 2444596; GeneCards: FASTKD1

Gene location (Human)
Chr.	Chromosome 2 (human)
Band	2q31.1	Start	169,528,508 bp
Band	2q31.1	End	169,573,875 bp

Gene location (Mouse)
Chr.	Chromosome 2 (mouse)
Band	2|2 C2	Start	69,517,159 bp
Band	2|2 C2	End	69,543,860 bp
RNA expression pattern
Bgee	Human / Mouse (ortholog); Top expressed in: secondary oocyte; right ventricle; mucosa of sigmoid colon; myocardium of left ventricle; mucosa of transverse colon; Brodmann area 23; apex of heart; visceral pleura; tibia; rectum / Top expressed in: interventricular septum; secondary oocyte; zygote; myocardium of ventricle; left lobe of liver; primary oocyte; brown adipose tissue; cardiac muscles; atrium; muscle of thigh; More reference expression data
BioGPS	n/a
Gene ontology
Molecular function	protein kinase activity; RNA binding
Cellular component	mitochondrion
Biological process	cellular respiration; protein phosphorylation; mitochondrial RNA metabolic process; regulation of mitochondrial mRNA stability
Sources:Amigo / QuickGO
Orthologs
Databases	NCBI: entry; OMA: entry
Species	Human	Mouse
Entrez	79675	320720
Ensembl	ENSG00000138399	ENSMUSG00000027086
UniProt	Q53R41	Q6DI86
RefSeq (mRNA)	NM_001281476; NM_024622; NM_001322046; NM_001322048; NM_001322049	NM_177244
RefSeq (protein)	NP_001268405; NP_001308975; NP_001308977; NP_001308978; NP_078898	NP_796218
Location (UCSC)	Chr 2: 169.53 – 169.57 Mb	Chr 2: 69.52 – 69.54 Mb
PubMed search
- Wikidata
View/Edit Human	View/Edit Mouse

FAST kinase domain-containing protein 1 is a protein that in humans is encoded by the FASTKD1 gene on chromosome 2. This protein is part of the FASTKD family, which is known for regulating the energy balance of mitochondria under stress. FASTKD1 is also an RNA-binding protein and has been associated with endometrial cancer.

== Structure ==
FASTKD1 shares structural characteristics of the FASTKD family, including an N-terminal mitochondrial targeting domain and three C-terminal domains: two FAST kinase-like domains (FAST_1 and FAST_2) and a RNA-binding domain (RAP). The mitochondrial targeting domain directs FASTKD1 to be imported into the mitochondria. Though the functions of the C-terminal domains are unknown, RAP possibly binds RNA during trans-splicing.

== Function ==
As a member of the FASTKD family, FASTKD1 localizes to the mitochondria to modulate their energy balance, especially under conditions of stress. Though ubiquitously expressed in all tissues, FASTKD1 appears more abundantly in skeletal muscle, heart muscle, and other tissues enriched in mitochondria. FASTKD1 has been validated as an RNA-binding protein.

== Clinical Significance ==
FASTKD1 is an important apoptotic constituent. During a normal embryologic processes, or during cell injury (such as ischemia-reperfusion injury during heart attacks and strokes) or during developments and processes in cancer, an apoptotic cell undergoes structural changes including cell shrinkage, plasma membrane blebbing, nuclear condensation, and fragmentation of the DNA and nucleus. This is followed by fragmentation into apoptotic bodies that are quickly removed by phagocytes, thereby preventing an inflammatory response. It is a mode of cell death defined by characteristic morphological, biochemical and molecular changes. It was first described as a "shrinkage necrosis", and then this term was replaced by apoptosis to emphasize its role opposite mitosis in tissue kinetics. In later stages of apoptosis the entire cell becomes fragmented, forming a number of plasma membrane-bounded apoptotic bodies which contain nuclear and or cytoplasmic elements. The ultrastructural appearance of necrosis is quite different, the main features being mitochondrial swelling, plasma membrane breakdown and cellular disintegration. Apoptosis occurs in many physiological and pathological processes. It plays an important role during embryonal development as programmed cell death and accompanies a variety of normal involutional processes in which it serves as a mechanism to remove "unwanted" cells.

FASTKD1 has been identified as a potential molecular biomarker for endometrial cancer, a cancer of the female genital tract, most notably using uterine aspirates This finding represent the basis for the development of a highly sensitive and specific minimally invasive method for the screenings of endometrial cancer. Accordingly, gene expression screening on 52 carcinoma samples and series of real-time quantitative PCR validation on 19 paired carcinomas and normal tissue samples and on 50 carcinoma and non carcinoma uterine aspirates were performed to identify and validate potential biomarkers of endometrial cancer. Furthermore, another study designed a strategy to explore gene expression signatures associated with the survival in acute lymphoblastic leukemia (ALL), to search for aberrant gene activity, which consists of applying several filters to transcriptomic datasets from two pediatric ALL studies. Six genes whose expression in leukemic blasts was associated with prognosis were identified:three genes predicting poor prognosis (AK022211, FASTKD1 and STARD4) and three genes associated with a favorable outcome (CAMSAP1, PCGF6 and SH3RF3). Thus it appears that FASTKD1 may also play a role in ALL.
