= RNF14 =

Protein-coding gene in the species Homo sapiens

Identifiers
- Aliases: RNF14, ARA54, HFB30, TRIAD2, HRIHFB2038, ring finger protein 14
- External IDs: OMIM: 605675; MGI: 1929668; GeneCards: RNF14
Enzyme activity
EC #	BRENDA	ExPASy	KEGG	MetaCyc
2.3.2.31	↗	↗	↗	↗

Gene location (Human)
Chr.	Chromosome 5 (human)
Band	5q31.3	Start	141,958,328 bp
Band	5q31.3	End	141,990,292 bp

Gene location (Mouse)
Chr.	Chromosome 18 (mouse)
Band	18 B3|18 20.2 cM	Start	38,417,590 bp
Band	18 B3|18 20.2 cM	End	38,450,902 bp
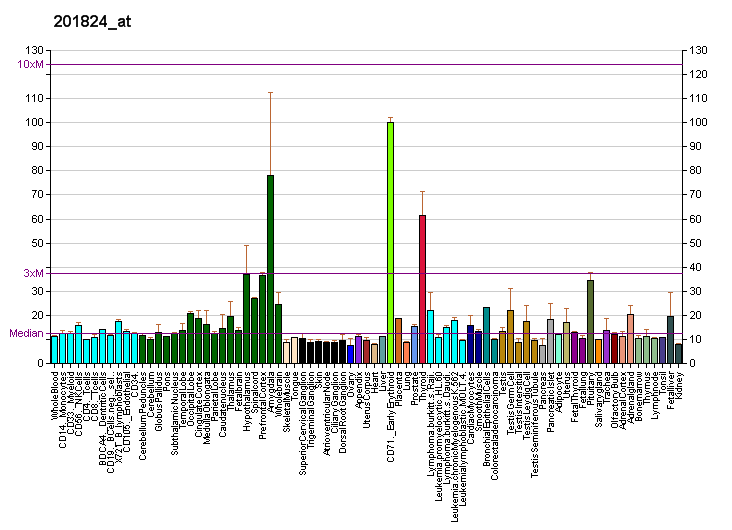

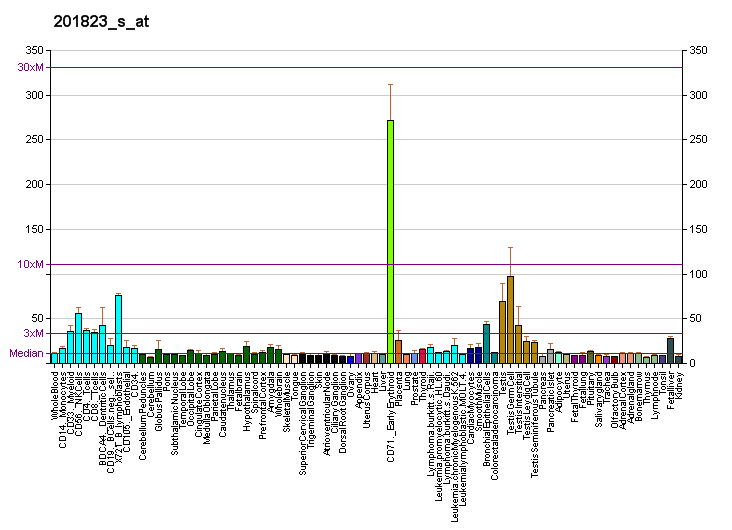
RNA expression pattern
Bgee	Human / Mouse (ortholog); Top expressed in: endothelial cell; oocyte; secondary oocyte; right testis; right adrenal cortex; left testis; Achilles tendon; islet of Langerhans; rectum; left adrenal gland / Top expressed in: CA3 field; perirhinal cortex; entorhinal cortex; dorsal tegmental nucleus; central gray substance of midbrain; superior colliculus; subiculum; ventral tegmental area; inferior colliculi; medulla oblongata; More reference expression data
BioGPS	More reference expression data
Gene ontology
Molecular function	ubiquitin protein ligase activity; transcription coactivator activity; metal ion binding; ubiquitin-protein transferase activity; ubiquitin-like protein transferase activity; protein binding; androgen receptor binding; ubiquitin conjugating enzyme binding; transferase activity
Cellular component	cytoplasm; ubiquitin ligase complex; nucleus; cytosol
Biological process	androgen receptor signaling pathway; regulation of transcription, DNA-templated; regulation of transcription by RNA polymerase II; protein polyubiquitination; transcription, DNA-templated; positive regulation of transcription, DNA-templated; protein ubiquitination; regulation of androgen receptor signaling pathway; positive regulation of proteasomal ubiquitin-dependent protein catabolic process; signal transduction; ubiquitin-dependent protein catabolic process
Sources:Amigo / QuickGO
Orthologs
Databases	NCBI: entry; OMA: entry
Species	Human	Mouse
Entrez	9604	56736
Ensembl	ENSG00000013561	ENSMUSG00000060450
UniProt	Q9UBS8	Q9JI90
RefSeq (mRNA)	NM_001201365; NM_004290; NM_183398; NM_183399; NM_183400 NM_183401	NM_001164621; NM_001164622; NM_020012; NM_001361264; NM_001361265 NM_001361266; NM_001361267; NM_001361268; NM_001361269
RefSeq (protein)	NP_001188294; NP_004281; NP_899645; NP_899646; NP_899647 NP_899648	NP_001158093; NP_001158094; NP_064396; NP_001348193; NP_001348194 NP_001348195; NP_001348196; NP_001348197; NP_001348198
Location (UCSC)	Chr 5: 141.96 – 141.99 Mb	Chr 18: 38.42 – 38.45 Mb
PubMed search
- Wikidata
View/Edit Human	View/Edit Mouse

E3 ubiquitin-protein ligase RNF14 is an enzyme that in humans is encoded by the RNF14 gene.

== Function ==
The protein encoded by this gene contains a RING zinc finger, a motif known to be involved in protein-protein interactions. This protein interacts with androgen receptor (AR) and may function as a coactivator that induces AR target gene expression in prostate. A dominant negative mutant of this gene has been demonstrated to inhibit the AR-mediated growth of prostate cancer. This protein also interacts with class III ubiquitin-conjugating enzymes (E2s) and may act as a ubiquitin-ligase (E3) in the ubiquitination of certain nuclear proteins. Five alternatively spliced transcript variants encoding two distinct isoforms have been reported. Another function of RNF14 protein relates to its regulation of the inter-relationship between bioenergetic status and inflammation. It influences the expression of mitochondrial and immune-related genes in skeletal muscle including cytokines and interferon regulatory factors.

== Interactions ==
RNF14 has been shown to interact with the Androgen receptor.

== See also ==
- RING finger domain
