= RNF38 =

Protein-coding gene in the species Homo sapiens

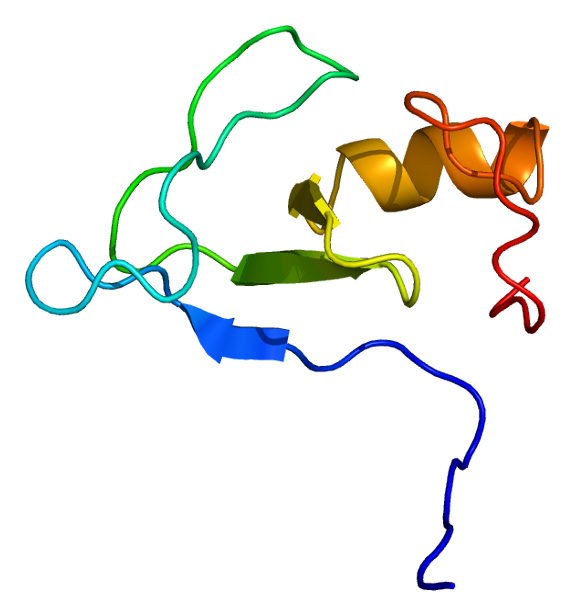

Identifiers
- Aliases: RNF38, ring finger protein 38
- External IDs: OMIM: 612488; MGI: 1920719; GeneCards: RNF38
Available structures
PDB	Ortholog search: PDBe RCSB
PDB	List of PDB id codes 1X4J, 4V3K, 4V3L
Enzyme activity
EC #	BRENDA	ExPASy	KEGG	MetaCyc
2.3.2.27	↗	↗	↗	↗

Gene location (Human)
Chr.	Chromosome 9 (human)
Band	9p13.2	Start	36,336,396 bp
Band	9p13.2	End	36,487,548 bp

Gene location (Mouse)
Chr.	Chromosome 4 (mouse)
Band	4|4 B1	Start	44,126,210 bp
Band	4|4 B1	End	44,233,789 bp
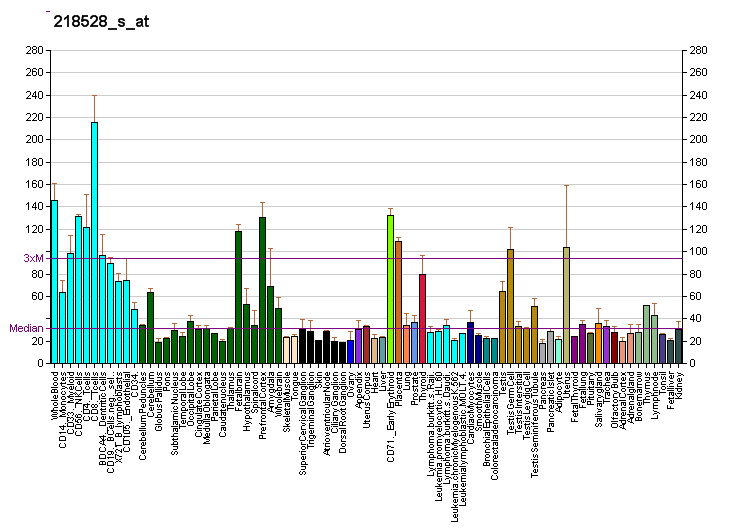
RNA expression pattern
Bgee	Human / Mouse (ortholog); Top expressed in: sperm; secondary oocyte; left testis; right testis; ganglionic eminence; tail of epididymis; metanephric glomerulus; germinal epithelium; Epithelium of choroid plexus; Brodmann area 23 / Top expressed in: zygote; secondary oocyte; seminiferous tubule; primary oocyte; aortic valve; ascending aorta; genital tubercle; tail of embryo; blood; ganglionic eminence; More reference expression data
BioGPS	More reference expression data
Gene ontology
Molecular function	metal ion binding; ubiquitin-protein transferase activity; ubiquitin protein ligase activity; transferase activity
Cellular component	sperm flagellum; nucleus; nucleoplasm
Biological process	male gonad development; protein ubiquitination; proteasome-mediated ubiquitin-dependent protein catabolic process
Sources:Amigo / QuickGO
Orthologs
Databases	NCBI: entry; OMA: entry
Species	Human	Mouse
Entrez	152006	73469
Ensembl	ENSG00000137075	ENSMUSG00000035696
UniProt	Q9H0F5	Q8BI21
RefSeq (mRNA)	NM_022781; NM_194328; NM_194329; NM_194330; NM_194331 NM_194332	NM_001038993; NM_175201; NM_001355181; NM_001379574; NM_001379575 NM_001379576; NM_001379577; NM_001379578; NM_001379579; NM_001379580; NM_001379581
RefSeq (protein)	NP_073618; NP_919309; NP_919310; NP_919311; NP_919313	NP_001034082; NP_780410; NP_001342110; NP_001366503; NP_001366504 NP_001366505; NP_001366506; NP_001366507; NP_001366508; NP_001366509; NP_001366510
Location (UCSC)	Chr 9: 36.34 – 36.49 Mb	Chr 4: 44.13 – 44.23 Mb
PubMed search
- Wikidata
View/Edit Human	View/Edit Mouse

RING finger protein 38 is a protein that in humans is encoded by the RNF38 gene.

This gene encodes a protein with a coiled-coil motif and a RING-H2 motif (C3H2C2) at its carboxy-terminus. The RING motif is a zinc-binding domain found in a large set of proteins playing roles in diverse cellular processes including oncogenesis, development, signal transduction, and apoptosis. Alternate transcriptional splice variants, encoding different isoforms, have been characterized.

== See also ==
- RING finger domain
