= RNF5 =

Protein-coding gene in the species Homo sapiens

Identifiers
- Aliases: RNF5, RING5, RMA1, ring finger protein 5
- External IDs: OMIM: 602677; MGI: 1860076; GeneCards: RNF5
Enzyme activity
EC #	BRENDA	ExPASy	KEGG	MetaCyc
2.3.2.27	↗	↗	↗	↗

Gene location (Human)
Chr.	Chromosome 6 (human)
Band	6p21.32	Start	32,178,405 bp
Band	6p21.32	End	32,180,793 bp

Gene location (Mouse)
Chr.	Chromosome 17 (mouse)
Band	17 B1|17 18.18 cM	Start	34,820,065 bp
Band	17 B1|17 18.18 cM	End	34,822,664 bp
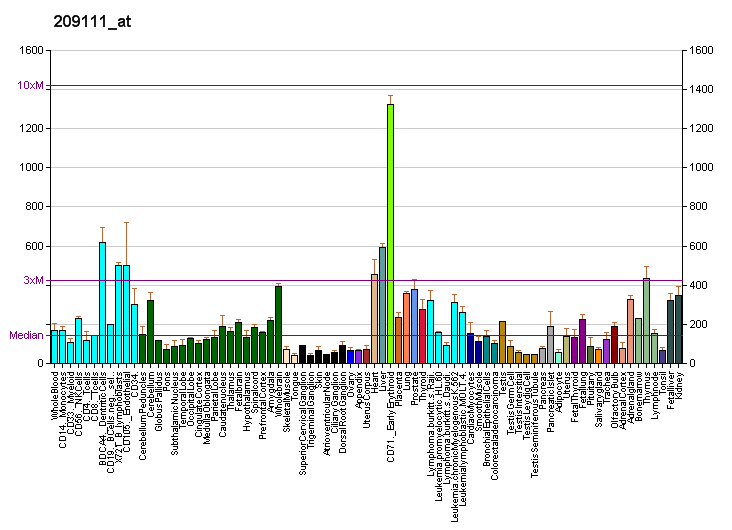
RNA expression pattern
Bgee	Human / Mouse (ortholog); Top expressed in: ganglionic eminence; human kidney; ventricular zone; right adrenal gland; mucosa of transverse colon; right adrenal cortex; monocyte; apex of heart; left ventricle; duodenum / Top expressed in: proximal tubule; right kidney; neural tube; neural layer of retina; yolk sac; ganglionic eminence; human kidney; pons; brown adipose tissue; olfactory bulb; More reference expression data
BioGPS	More reference expression data
Gene ontology
Molecular function	metal ion binding; ubiquitin-protein transferase activity; protein binding; ubiquitin-like protein conjugating enzyme binding; transferase activity; identical protein binding; zinc ion binding; ubiquitin protein ligase activity; protein-containing complex binding
Cellular component	integral component of membrane; mitochondrial membranes; membrane; mitochondrion; Derlin-1 retrotranslocation complex; endoplasmic reticulum; endoplasmic reticulum membrane; endoplasmic reticulum quality control compartment
Biological process	response to bacterium; protein K63-linked ubiquitination; ER-associated misfolded protein catabolic process; regulation of autophagosome assembly; protein K48-linked ubiquitination; protein destabilization; protein ubiquitination; negative regulation of autophagy; transmembrane transport; endoplasmic reticulum mannose trimming; ubiquitin-dependent ERAD pathway; ERAD pathway; ubiquitin-dependent protein catabolic process
Sources:Amigo / QuickGO
Orthologs
Databases	NCBI: entry; OMA: entry
Species	Human	Mouse
Entrez	6048	54197
Ensembl	ENSG00000227277; ENSG00000223767; ENSG00000228907; ENSG00000183574; ENSG00000204308 ENSG00000225452; ENSG00000228405	ENSMUSG00000015478
UniProt	Q99942	O35445
RefSeq (mRNA)	NM_006913	NM_019403
RefSeq (protein)	NP_008844	NP_062276
Location (UCSC)	Chr 6: 32.18 – 32.18 Mb	Chr 17: 34.82 – 34.82 Mb
PubMed search
- Wikidata
View/Edit Human	View/Edit Mouse

E3 ubiquitin-protein ligase RNF5 is an enzyme that in humans is encoded by the RNF5 gene.

== Function ==
The protein encoded by this gene contains a RING finger, which is a motif known to be involved in protein-protein interactions. This protein is a membrane-bound ubiquitin ligase. It can regulate cell motility by targeting paxillin ubiquitination and altering the distribution and localization of paxillin in cytoplasm and cell focal adhesions.
