= RNF144A =

Protein-coding gene in the species Homo sapiens

Identifiers
- Aliases: RNF144A, RNF144, UBCE7IP4, ring finger protein 144A, hUIP4, UIP4
- External IDs: MGI: 1344401; GeneCards: RNF144A
Available structures
PDB	Ortholog search: PDBe RCSB
PDB	List of PDB id codes 1WIM
Enzyme activity
EC #	BRENDA	ExPASy	KEGG	MetaCyc
2.3.2.31	↗	↗	↗	↗

Gene location (Human)
Chr.	Chromosome 2 (human)
Band	2p25.1	Start	6,917,412 bp
Band	2p25.1	End	7,068,286 bp

Gene location (Mouse)
Chr.	Chromosome 12 (mouse)
Band	12|12 A2	Start	26,350,963 bp
Band	12|12 A2	End	26,465,253 bp
RNA expression pattern
Bgee	Human / Mouse (ortholog); Top expressed in: cerebellar hemisphere; right hemisphere of cerebellum; ganglionic eminence; corpus callosum; body of pancreas; inferior ganglion of vagus nerve; C1 segment; paraflocculus of cerebellum; internal globus pallidus; nucleus accumbens / Top expressed in: granulocyte; right lung lobe; maxillary prominence; left lung lobe; mandibular prominence; Rostral migratory stream; medial ganglionic eminence; brown adipose tissue; external carotid artery; internal carotid artery; More reference expression data
BioGPS	n/a
Gene ontology
Molecular function	ubiquitin-protein transferase activity; ubiquitin conjugating enzyme binding; metal ion binding; transferase activity; ubiquitin protein ligase activity; protein binding
Cellular component	integral component of membrane; plasma membrane; Golgi apparatus; cytoplasmic vesicle membrane; membrane; cytoplasmic vesicle; ubiquitin ligase complex; endosome membrane; intracellular membrane-bounded organelle; cytoplasm
Biological process	protein polyubiquitination; positive regulation of proteasomal ubiquitin-dependent protein catabolic process; protein ubiquitination; ubiquitin-dependent protein catabolic process
Sources:Amigo / QuickGO
Orthologs
Databases	NCBI: entry; OMA: entry
Species	Human	Mouse
Entrez	9781	108089
Ensembl	ENSG00000151692	ENSMUSG00000020642
UniProt	P50876	Q925F3
RefSeq (mRNA)	NM_014746; NM_001349181; NM_001349182; NM_001349183; NM_001349184 NM_001349185; NM_001349186	NM_001081977; NM_080563
RefSeq (protein)	NP_055561; NP_001336110; NP_001336111; NP_001336112; NP_001336113 NP_001336114; NP_001336115	NP_001075446; NP_542130
Location (UCSC)	Chr 2: 6.92 – 7.07 Mb	Chr 12: 26.35 – 26.47 Mb
PubMed search
- Wikidata
View/Edit Human	View/Edit Mouse

RNF144A is an E3 ubiquitin ligase belonging to the RING-between RING (RBR) family of ubiquitin ligases, whose specific members have been shown to function as RING-HECT hybrid E3 ligases. RNF144A is most closely related to RNF144B at the protein level, and the two proteins together comprise a subdomain within the RBR family of proteins. The ubiquitin ligase activity of RNF144A catalyzes ubiquitin linkages at the K6-, K11- and K48- positions of ubiquitin in vitro, and is regulated by self-association through its transmembrane domain.

The biological functions of RNF144A is/are relatively unknown beyond its intrinsic enzymatic activity. Somatic mutations of RNF144A have been catalogued in cancer genetic databases in several primary human tumors, including breast, stomach, lymphoma, glioblastoma, uterine and lung cancers. Other members of the RBR family have been associated with neurological and immunological diseases, most notably parkin, HOIL-1L and HOIP(RNF31).

Current known substrates of RNF144A targeted for degradation are proteins involved in DNA repair, heatshock/chaperone function and signalling, consistent with the predominant association of this protein with cancer, and include (DNA-PKcs), PARP1, HSPA2, BMI1, and RAF1.

== See also ==
- RING finger domain
