= ZNRF1 =

Protein-coding gene in the species Homo sapiens

Identifiers
- Aliases: ZNRF1, NIN283, zinc and ring finger 1, E3 ubiquitin protein ligase, zinc and ring finger 1
- External IDs: OMIM: 612060; MGI: 2177308; GeneCards: ZNRF1
Enzyme activity
| EC # | BRENDA | ExPASy | KEGG | MetaCyc |
|---|---|---|---|---|
| 2.3.2.27 | ↗ | ↗ | ↗ | ↗ |

Gene location (Human)
| Chr. | Chromosome 16 (human) |
| Band | 16q23.1 | Start | 74,999,024 bp |
| Band | 16q23.1 | End | 75,110,994 bp |

Gene location (Mouse)
| Chr. | Chromosome 8 (mouse) |
| Band | 8|8 E1 | Start | 112,262,729 bp |
| Band | 8|8 E1 | End | 112,352,662 bp |
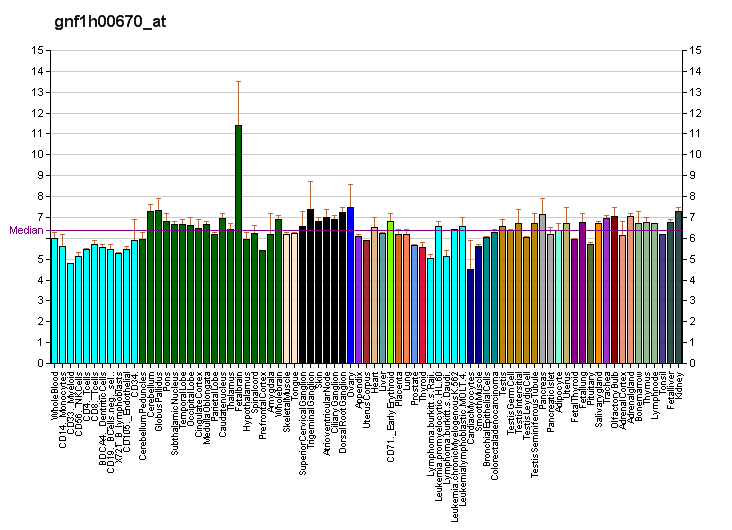

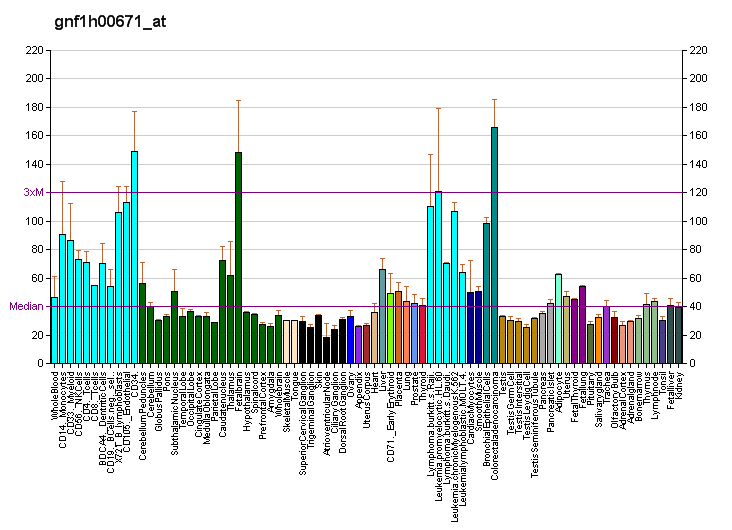
RNA expression pattern
| Bgee | Human / Mouse (ortholog); Top expressed in: thymus; mucosa of pharynx; body of tongue; secondary oocyte; gingival epithelium; pancreatic ductal cell; quadriceps femoris muscle; vastus lateralis muscle; Skeletal muscle tissue of rectus abdominis; muscle of thigh / Top expressed in: granulocyte; thymus; superior surface of tongue; gallbladder; superior frontal gyrus; neural layer of retina; primary visual cortex; dentate gyrus of hippocampal formation granule cell; muscle of thigh; lip; More reference expression data |
| BioGPS | More reference expression data |
Gene ontology
| Molecular function | protein binding; ubiquitin protein ligase activity; metal ion binding; ubiquitin-protein transferase activity; transferase activity |
| Cellular component | endosome; cell junction; lysosome; synapse; synaptic vesicle membrane; membrane; cytoplasmic vesicle; cytosol |
| Biological process | protein K48-linked ubiquitination; protein ubiquitination; protein polyubiquitination; proteasome-mediated ubiquitin-dependent protein catabolic process |
Sources:Amigo / QuickGO
Orthologs
| Databases | NCBI: entry; OMA: entry |
| Species | Human | Mouse |
| Entrez | 84937 | 170737 |
| Ensembl | ENSG00000186187 | ENSMUSG00000033545 |
| UniProt | Q8ND25 | Q91V17 |
| RefSeq (mRNA) | NM_032268 | NM_001168621; NM_001168622; NM_001168623; NM_133206; NM_001363488 NM_001363489 |
| RefSeq (protein) | NP_115644 | NP_001162092; NP_001162093; NP_001162094; NP_573469; NP_001350417 NP_001350418 |
| Location (UCSC) | Chr 16: 75 – 75.11 Mb | Chr 8: 112.26 – 112.35 Mb |
| PubMed search |
- Wikidata
| View/Edit Human | View/Edit Mouse |

E3 ubiquitin-protein ligase ZNRF1 is an enzyme that in humans is encoded by the ZNRF1 gene.

In a study identifying genes in rat that are upregulated in response to nerve damage, a gene which is highly expressed in ganglia and in the central nervous system was found. The protein encoded by the rat gene contains both a zinc finger and a RING finger motif and is localized in the endosome/lysosome compartment, indicating that it may be involved in ubiquitin-mediated protein modification. The protein encoded by this human gene is highly similar in sequence to that encoded by the rat gene.
