= DTX3L =

Protein-coding gene in the species Homo sapiens

Identifiers
- Aliases: DTX3L, BBAP, deltex 3 like, E3 ubiquitin ligase, deltex E3 ubiquitin ligase 3L, RNF143
- External IDs: OMIM: 613143; MGI: 2656973; GeneCards: DTX3L
Available structures
PDB	Ortholog search: PDBe RCSB
PDB	List of PDB id codes 3PG6
Enzyme activity
EC #	BRENDA	ExPASy	KEGG	MetaCyc
2.3.2.27	↗	↗	↗	↗

Gene location (Human)
Chr.	Chromosome 3 (human)
Band	3q21.1	Start	122,564,338 bp
Band	3q21.1	End	122,575,203 bp

Gene location (Mouse)
Chr.	Chromosome 16 (mouse)
Band	16|16 B3	Start	35,746,881 bp
Band	16|16 B3	End	35,759,521 bp
RNA expression pattern
Bgee	Human / Mouse (ortholog); Top expressed in: mucosa of ileum; pancreatic ductal cell; lower lobe of lung; decidua; epithelium of nasopharynx; pericardium; mucosa of paranasal sinus; germinal epithelium; pylorus; human penis / Top expressed in: mesenteric lymph nodes; jejunum; seminal vesicula; submandibular gland; blood; lumbar spinal ganglion; ileum; cervix; subcutaneous adipose tissue; thymus; More reference expression data
BioGPS	n/a
Gene ontology
Molecular function	protein binding; metal ion binding; ubiquitin-protein transferase activity; transferase activity; enzyme inhibitor activity; enzyme activator activity; enzyme binding; histone binding; ubiquitin-like protein ligase binding; STAT family protein binding
Cellular component	cytoplasm; nucleus; nucleoplasm; cytosol; early endosome; lysosome; lysosomal membrane; endosome; membrane; early endosome membrane; protein-containing complex
Biological process	histone monoubiquitination; double-strand break repair; DNA repair; protein ubiquitination; cellular response to DNA damage stimulus; protein polyubiquitination; positive regulation of defense response to virus by host; endosome to lysosome transport; positive regulation of protein binding; histone H2A ubiquitination; histone H2B ubiquitination; positive regulation of chromatin binding; positive regulation of transcription, DNA-templated; negative regulation of ubiquitin-protein transferase activity; protein autoubiquitination; protein K48-linked ubiquitination; positive regulation of protein localization to nucleus; positive regulation of NAD+ ADP-ribosyltransferase activity; positive regulation of protein localization to early endosome; positive regulation of receptor catabolic process; positive regulation of double-strand break repair via nonhomologous end joining; immune system process; protein transport; innate immune response; defense response to virus; chromatin organization; ubiquitin-dependent protein catabolic process; Notch signaling pathway
Sources:Amigo / QuickGO
Orthologs
Databases	NCBI: entry; OMA: entry
Species	Human	Mouse
Entrez	151636	209200
Ensembl	ENSG00000163840	ENSMUSG00000049502
UniProt	Q8TDB6	Q3UIR3
RefSeq (mRNA)	NM_138287	NM_001013371
RefSeq (protein)	NP_612144	NP_001013389
Location (UCSC)	Chr 3: 122.56 – 122.58 Mb	Chr 16: 35.75 – 35.76 Mb
PubMed search
- Wikidata
View/Edit Human	View/Edit Mouse

Deltex E3 ubiquitin ligase 3L is a protein that in humans is encoded by the DTX3L gene. It functions as an ubiquitin ligase (E3), and is over-expressed in chemotherapy-resistant lymphomas. It is a member of the DTX family of proteins. Among other roles it has a function in DNA damage repair.

It was discovered through two-hybrid screening during a search for binding partners of PARP9 (formerly BAL), a gene related to the risk of B-cell lymphoma. and was originally named BBAP (B-lymphoma- and BAL-associated protein).

DTX3L and PARP9 are both located in the same 48kB region of the genome, and are both regulated by a IFN-γ-responsive bidirectional promoter. DTX3L has a long N-terminus domain distinct from other DTX-family proteins that allows it form dimers with itself and other proteins. It has been found to be up-regulated by METTL3.

== Function ==
DTX3L functions as an ubiquitin ligase or E3. These proteins bind to ubiquitin-conjugating enzymes (E2s), and then transfer and bind the ubiquitin (activated by E1s) from the E2s to the target protein. Along with all other known DTX-family proteins (as of 2023), DTX3L is involved in the regulation of Notch signaling.

DTX3L also plays a role in DNA damage repair, which has been associated with its ability to selectively mono-ubiquitylate (bind one ubiquitin to) histone H4. It helps to protect cells exposed to DNA damaging agents.

DTX3L can form a complex with PARP9. This complex functions as a ubiquitin ligase and ubiquitinates both host histone H2BJ, to promote expression of interferon-stimulated genes, and viral 3C protease to disrupt viral assembly. This can help to control viral infection. PARP9 can also affect DXT3L's function in DNA damage repair. The DXT3L-PARP9 complex mediates mono-ADP-ribosylation of ubiquitin; this prevents it from being conjugated and inhibits DXT3L's function as an ubiquitin ligase. The NAD+ dependent binding of PARP9 to poly-ADP-ribose, instead, enhances the activity of DXT3L as a ubiquitin ligase. DTX3L can also form a complex with DTX1.

DTX3L also affects signaling by inhibiting the sorting of the G-protein coupled receptor CXCR4 through the endosomes to degradation in the lysosomes. When CXCR4 is activated, DXT3L localizes to early endosomes and inhibits the E3 ubiquitin ligase atrophin-1 interacting protein 4. This reduces the extent to which the protein ESCRT-0 is ubiquitinated, which reduces its ability to sort CXCR4 into the lysosomes. The implications of this effect (as of 2023) in cancer biology are unknown.
