= RNF19A =

Protein-coding gene in the species Homo sapiens

Identifiers
- Aliases: RNF19A, RNF19, ring finger protein 19A, RBR E3 ubiquitin protein ligase
- External IDs: OMIM: 607119; MGI: 1353623; GeneCards: RNF19A
Enzyme activity
EC #	BRENDA	ExPASy	KEGG	MetaCyc
2.3.2.31	↗	↗	↗	↗

Gene location (Human)
Chr.	Chromosome 8 (human)
Band	8q22.2	Start	100,257,060 bp
Band	8q22.2	End	100,336,218 bp

Gene location (Mouse)
Chr.	Chromosome 15 (mouse)
Band	15|15 B3.1	Start	36,240,079 bp
Band	15|15 B3.1	End	36,283,293 bp
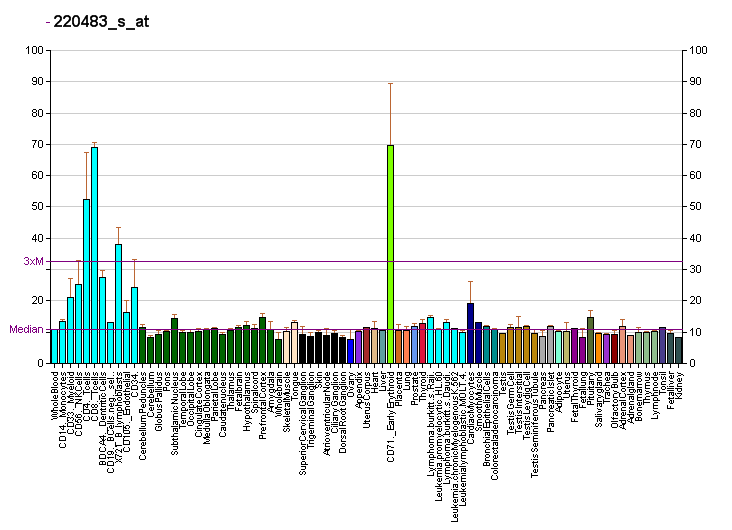
RNA expression pattern
Bgee	Human / Mouse (ortholog); Top expressed in: Achilles tendon; sperm; epithelium of colon; right lung; canal of the cervix; gallbladder; epithelium of nasopharynx; left uterine tube; tonsil; mucosa of paranasal sinus / Top expressed in: spermatid; spermatocyte; seminiferous tubule; renal corpuscle; granulocyte; lumbar spinal ganglion; medullary collecting duct; fetal liver hematopoietic progenitor cell; zygote; secondary oocyte; More reference expression data
BioGPS	More reference expression data
Gene ontology
Molecular function	transcription factor binding; ubiquitin conjugating enzyme binding; ubiquitin protein ligase activity; metal ion binding; ubiquitin-protein transferase activity; transferase activity
Cellular component	cytoplasm; integral component of membrane; microtubule organizing center; centrosome; cytoskeleton; membrane; ubiquitin ligase complex; cytosol; hippocampal mossy fiber to CA3 synapse; postsynapse; glutamatergic synapse
Biological process	microtubule cytoskeleton organization; positive regulation of proteasomal ubiquitin-dependent protein catabolic process; protein ubiquitination; protein polyubiquitination; regulation of protein catabolic process at postsynapse, modulating synaptic transmission; ubiquitin-dependent protein catabolic process
Sources:Amigo / QuickGO
Orthologs
Databases	NCBI: entry; OMA: entry
Species	Human	Mouse
Entrez	25897	30945
Ensembl	ENSG00000034677	ENSMUSG00000022280
UniProt	Q9NV58	P50636
RefSeq (mRNA)	NM_001280539; NM_015435; NM_183419; NM_001353837; NM_001353838	NM_013923; NM_001357631
RefSeq (protein)	NP_001267468; NP_056250; NP_904355; NP_001340766; NP_001340767	NP_038951; NP_001344560
Location (UCSC)	Chr 8: 100.26 – 100.34 Mb	Chr 15: 36.24 – 36.28 Mb
PubMed search
- Wikidata
View/Edit Human	View/Edit Mouse

E3 ubiquitin-protein ligase RNF19A is an enzyme that in humans is encoded by the RNF19A gene.

The protein encoded by this gene contains two RING-finger motifs and an IBR (in between RING fingers) motif. This protein is an E3 ubiquitin ligase that is localized in Lewy bodies (LBs), neuronal inclusions characteristic of Parkinson's disease (PD). This protein interacts with UBE2L3/UBCH7 and UBE2E2/UBCH8, but not other ubiquitin-conjugating enzymes. This protein is found to bind and ubiquitylate synphilin 1 (SNCAIP), which is an interacting protein of alpha-synuclein in neurons, and a major component of LB. Alternatively-spliced transcript variants encoding the same protein have been reported.

== See also ==
- RING finger domain
