= RNF10 =

Protein-coding gene in the species Homo sapiens

Identifiers
- Aliases: RNF10, RIE2, ring finger protein 10
- External IDs: OMIM: 615998; MGI: 1859162; GeneCards: RNF10
Enzyme activity
EC #	BRENDA	ExPASy	KEGG	MetaCyc
2.3.2.27	↗	↗	↗	↗

Gene location (Human)
Chr.	Chromosome 12 (human)
Band	12q24.31	Start	120,533,480 bp
Band	12q24.31	End	120,577,588 bp

Gene location (Mouse)
Chr.	Chromosome 5 (mouse)
Band	5 F|5 56.01 cM	Start	115,379,471 bp
Band	5 F|5 56.01 cM	End	115,410,957 bp
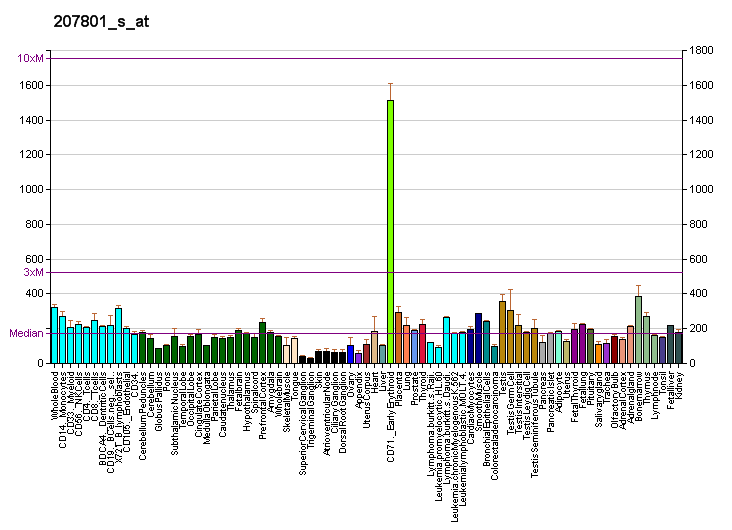

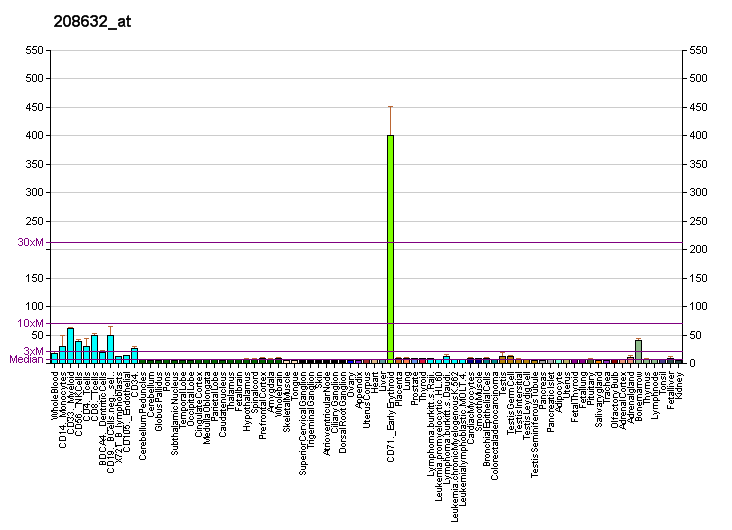
RNA expression pattern
Bgee	Human / Mouse (ortholog); Top expressed in: left testis; right testis; muscle of thigh; gastrocnemius muscle; sural nerve; stromal cell of endometrium; anterior pituitary; ventricular zone; epithelium of colon; blood / Top expressed in: blood; neural layer of retina; entorhinal cortex; choroid plexus of fourth ventricle; lactiferous gland; perirhinal cortex; CA3 field; muscle of thigh; superior surface of tongue; dentate gyrus of hippocampal formation granule cell; More reference expression data
BioGPS	More reference expression data
Gene ontology
Molecular function	DNA binding; protein binding; metal ion binding; ubiquitin-protein transferase activity
Cellular component	cytoplasm; nucleus
Biological process	positive regulation of transcription, DNA-templated; positive regulation of myelination; regulation of transcription, DNA-templated; transcription, DNA-templated; negative regulation of Schwann cell proliferation; positive regulation of transcription by RNA polymerase II; protein autoubiquitination
Sources:Amigo / QuickGO
Orthologs
Databases	NCBI: entry; OMA: entry
Species	Human	Mouse
Entrez	9921	50849
Ensembl	ENSG00000022840	ENSMUSG00000041740
UniProt	Q8N5U6	Q3UIW5
RefSeq (mRNA)	NM_014868; NM_001330474	NM_016698; NM_001302448; NM_001302449
RefSeq (protein)	NP_001317403; NP_055683	NP_001289377; NP_001289378; NP_057907
Location (UCSC)	Chr 12: 120.53 – 120.58 Mb	Chr 5: 115.38 – 115.41 Mb
PubMed search
- Wikidata
View/Edit Human	View/Edit Mouse

RING finger protein 10 is a protein that in humans is encoded by the RNF10 gene.

== Function ==
The protein encoded by this gene contains a ring finger motif, which is known to be involved in protein-protein interactions. The specific function of this protein has not yet been determined. EST data suggests the existence of multiple alternatively spliced transcript variants, however, their full length nature is not known.
