= RNF32 =

Protein-coding gene in the species Homo sapiens

Identifiers
- Aliases: RNF32, FKSG33, HSD15, LMBR2, ring finger protein 32
- External IDs: OMIM: 610241; MGI: 1861747; GeneCards: RNF32

Gene location (Human)
Chr.	Chromosome 7 (human)
Band	7q36.3	Start	156,640,281 bp
Band	7q36.3	End	156,677,130 bp

Gene location (Mouse)
Chr.	Chromosome 5 (mouse)
Band	5 B1|5 14.78 cM	Start	29,400,990 bp
Band	5 B1|5 14.78 cM	End	29,433,455 bp
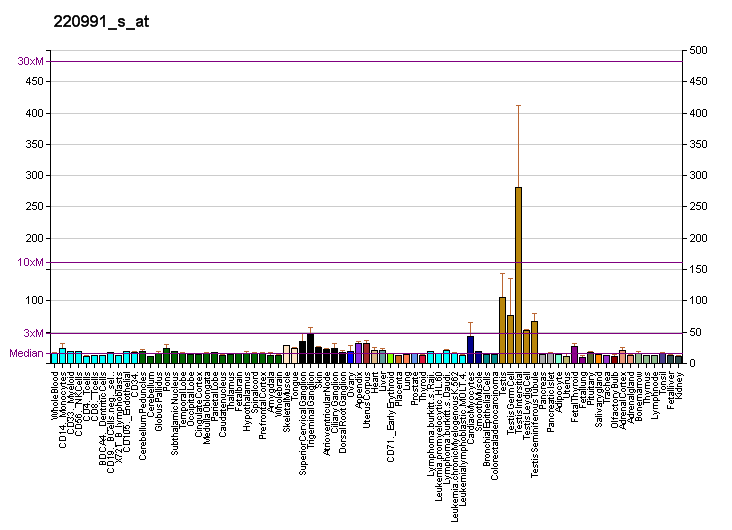
RNA expression pattern
Bgee	Human / Mouse (ortholog); Top expressed in: left testis; right testis; sperm; testicle; bronchial epithelial cell; C1 segment; right uterine tube; gonad; islet of Langerhans; left adrenal cortex / Top expressed in: spermatocyte; spermatid; seminiferous tubule; interventricular septum; genital tubercle; zygote; secondary oocyte; primary oocyte; urethra; female urethra; More reference expression data
BioGPS	More reference expression data
Orthologs
Databases	NCBI: entry; OMA: entry
Species	Human	Mouse
Entrez	140545	56874
Ensembl	ENSG00000105982	ENSMUSG00000029130
UniProt	Q9H0A6	Q9JIT1
RefSeq (mRNA)	NM_001184996; NM_001184997; NM_001308273; NM_001308274; NM_030936	NM_001289757; NM_021470
RefSeq (protein)	NP_001171925; NP_001171926; NP_001295202; NP_001295203; NP_112198	NP_001276686; NP_067445
Location (UCSC)	Chr 7: 156.64 – 156.68 Mb	Chr 5: 29.4 – 29.43 Mb
PubMed search
- Wikidata
View/Edit Human	View/Edit Mouse

RING finger protein 32 is a protein that in humans is encoded by the RNF32 gene.

The protein encoded by this gene contains two RING finger motifs. RING finger motifs are present in a variety of functionally distinct proteins and are known to be involved in protein-DNA or protein-protein interactions. This gene was found to be expressed during spermatogenesis, most likely in spermatocytes and/or in spermatids. Several alternatively spliced transcript variants exist, but their full length natures are not clear.

== See also ==
- RING finger domain
