= RNF123 =

Protein-coding gene in the species Homo sapiens

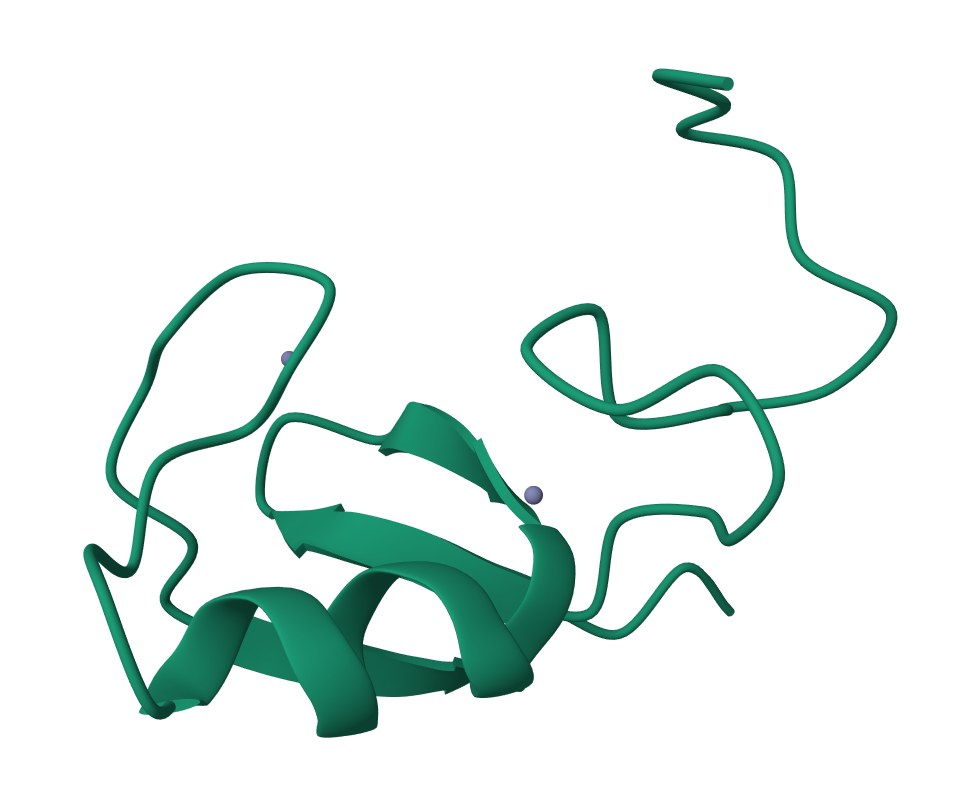

Identifiers
- Aliases: RNF123, KPC1, FP1477, ring finger protein 123
- External IDs: OMIM: 614472; MGI: 2148796; GeneCards: RNF123
Available structures
PDB	Ortholog search: PDBe RCSB
PDB	List of PDB id codes 2MA6
Enzyme activity
EC #	BRENDA	ExPASy	KEGG	MetaCyc
2.3.2.27	↗	↗	↗	↗

Gene location (Human)
Chr.	Chromosome 3 (human)
Band	3p21.31	Start	49,689,538 bp
Band	3p21.31	End	49,721,529 bp

Gene location (Mouse)
Chr.	Chromosome 9 (mouse)
Band	9|9 F1	Start	107,928,733 bp
Band	9|9 F1	End	107,960,545 bp
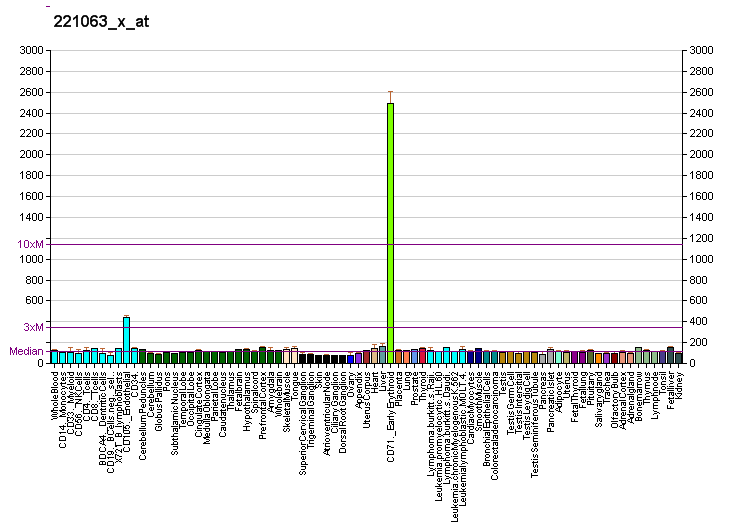
RNA expression pattern
Bgee	Human / Mouse (ortholog); Top expressed in: muscle of thigh; gastrocnemius muscle; vastus lateralis muscle; Skeletal muscle tissue of rectus abdominis; right lobe of liver; triceps brachii muscle; body of tongue; biceps brachii; Skeletal muscle tissue of biceps brachii; thoracic diaphragm / Top expressed in: neural layer of retina; saccule; otic vesicle; muscle of thigh; fetal liver hematopoietic progenitor cell; lens; otic placode; cerebellar cortex; skeletal muscle tissue; triceps brachii muscle; More reference expression data
BioGPS	More reference expression data
Gene ontology
Molecular function	metal ion binding; transferase activity; ubiquitin-protein transferase activity
Cellular component	cytoplasm; cytosol; nuclear membrane
Biological process	protein ubiquitination; protein deubiquitination; proteolysis involved in cellular protein catabolic process
Sources:Amigo / QuickGO
Orthologs
Databases	NCBI: entry; OMA: entry
Species	Human	Mouse
Entrez	63891	84585
Ensembl	ENSG00000164068	ENSMUSG00000041528
UniProt	Q5XPI4	Q5XPI3
RefSeq (mRNA)	NM_022064	NM_032543; NM_001311152
RefSeq (protein)	NP_071347	NP_001298081; NP_115932
Location (UCSC)	Chr 3: 49.69 – 49.72 Mb	Chr 9: 107.93 – 107.96 Mb
PubMed search
- Wikidata
View/Edit Human	View/Edit Mouse

E3 ubiquitin-protein ligase RNF123 is an enzyme that in humans is encoded by the RNF123 gene.

The protein encoded by this gene contains a RING finger, a motif present in a variety of functionally distinct proteins and known to be involved in protein-protein and protein-DNA interactions. Increased expression of the gene has been associated with laminopathies, and in degradation of chromatin associated proteins such as HP1 (Chaturvedi et al, 2012, PMID: 23077635).

== See also ==
- RING finger domain
