= RNF125 =

Protein-coding gene in the species Homo sapiens

Identifiers
- Aliases: RNF125, TRAC-1, TRAC1, TNORS, ring finger protein 125, E3 ubiquitin protein ligase, ring finger protein 125
- External IDs: OMIM: 610432; MGI: 1914914; GeneCards: RNF125
Enzyme activity
| EC # | BRENDA | ExPASy | KEGG | MetaCyc |
|---|---|---|---|---|
| 2.3.2.27 | ↗ | ↗ | ↗ | ↗ |

Gene location (Human)
| Chr. | Chromosome 18 (human) |
| Band | 18q12.1 | Start | 32,018,825 bp |
| Band | 18q12.1 | End | 32,073,219 bp |
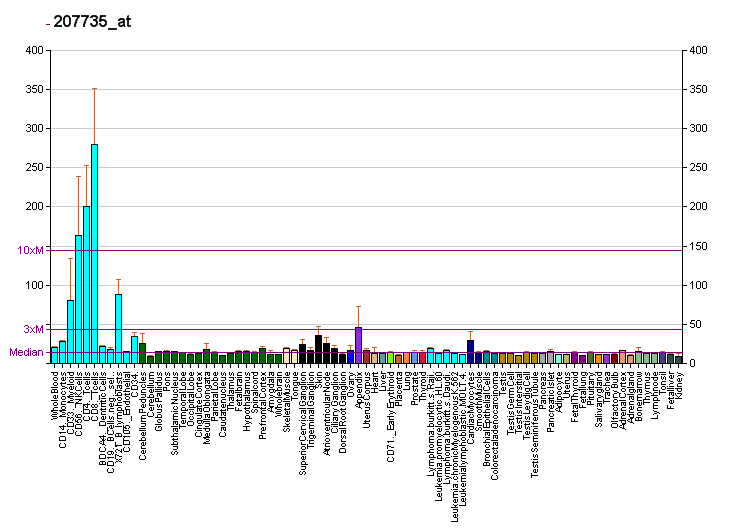
RNA expression pattern
| Bgee | Human / Mouse (ortholog); Top expressed in: jejunal mucosa; oocyte; secondary oocyte; parietal pleura; mucosa of sigmoid colon; superficial temporal artery; visceral pleura; white blood cell; monocyte; inferior ganglion of vagus nerve / n/a; More reference expression data |
| BioGPS | More reference expression data |
Gene ontology
| Molecular function | metal ion binding; p53 binding; protein binding; transferase activity; zinc ion binding; ubiquitin conjugating enzyme binding; ubiquitin protein ligase activity |
| Cellular component | intracellular membrane-bounded organelle; membrane; Golgi membrane; Golgi apparatus; VCP-NPL4-UFD1 AAA ATPase complex |
| Biological process | adaptive immune response; positive regulation of proteasomal ubiquitin-dependent protein catabolic process; protein ubiquitination; immune system process; ubiquitin-dependent protein catabolic process; negative regulation of type I interferon production; negative regulation of RIG-I signaling pathway; protein polyubiquitination |
Sources:Amigo / QuickGO
Orthologs
| Databases | NCBI: entry; OMA: entry |
| Species | Human | Mouse |
| Entrez | 54941 | 67664 |
| Ensembl | ENSG00000101695 | ENSMUSG00000033107 |
| UniProt | Q96EQ8 | Q9D9R0 |
| RefSeq (mRNA) | NM_017831 | NM_026301; NM_001364973 |
| RefSeq (protein) | NP_060301 | NP_080577; NP_001351902 |
| Location (UCSC) | Chr 18: 32.02 – 32.07 Mb | n/a |
| PubMed search |
- Wikidata
| View/Edit Human | View/Edit Mouse |

E3 ubiquitin-protein ligase RNF125 is an enzyme that in humans is encoded by the RNF125 gene.

This gene encodes a novel E3 ubiquitin ligase that contains an N-terminal RING finger domain. The encoded protein may function as a positive regulator in the T-cell receptor signaling pathway.
