= RNF20 =

Protein-coding gene in the species Homo sapiens

Identifiers
- Aliases: RNF20, BRE1, BRE1A, hBRE1, ring finger protein 20
- External IDs: OMIM: 607699; MGI: 1925927; GeneCards: RNF20
Enzyme activity
EC #	BRENDA	ExPASy	KEGG	MetaCyc
2.3.2.27	↗	↗	↗	↗

Gene location (Human)
Chr.	Chromosome 9 (human)
Band	9q31.1	Start	101,533,853 bp
Band	9q31.1	End	101,563,344 bp

Gene location (Mouse)
Chr.	Chromosome 4 (mouse)
Band	4|4 B1	Start	49,632,006 bp
Band	4|4 B1	End	49,656,887 bp
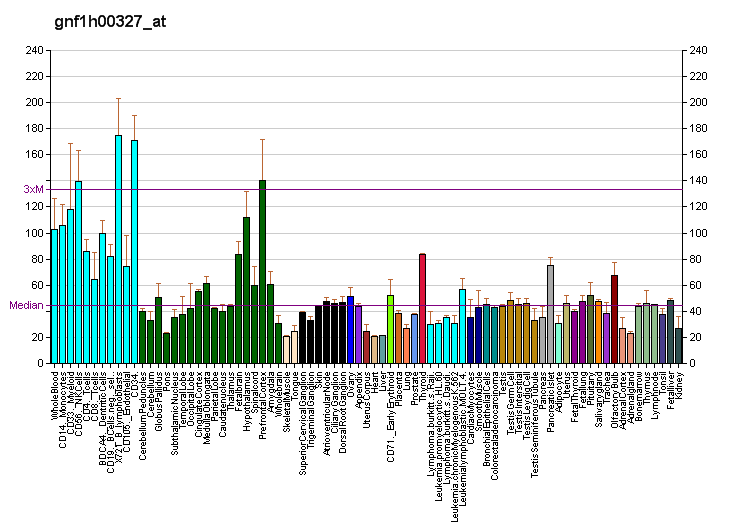
RNA expression pattern
Bgee	Human / Mouse (ortholog); Top expressed in: tibialis anterior muscle; cardiac muscle tissue of right atrium; myocardium of left ventricle; mucosa of ileum; deltoid muscle; caput epididymis; bronchial epithelial cell; parietal pleura; retinal pigment epithelium; corpus callosum / Top expressed in: tail of embryo; genital tubercle; blood; neural layer of retina; seminal vesicula; secondary oocyte; zygote; granulocyte; maxillary prominence; renal corpuscle; More reference expression data
BioGPS	More reference expression data
Gene ontology
Molecular function	transcription coactivator activity; histone binding; p53 binding; chromatin binding; metal ion binding; mRNA 3'-UTR binding; protein binding; ubiquitin protein ligase binding; transferase activity; ubiquitin-protein transferase activity
Cellular component	ubiquitin ligase complex; HULC complex; nucleolus; nucleus; nucleoplasm
Biological process	regulation of transcription, DNA-templated; negative regulation of mRNA polyadenylation; positive regulation of histone methylation; ubiquitin-dependent protein catabolic process; protein polyubiquitination; positive regulation of transcription, DNA-templated; negative regulation of cell migration; regulation of mitotic cell cycle; histone H2B ubiquitination; positive regulation of histone H2B ubiquitination; histone ubiquitination; protein ubiquitination; histone monoubiquitination; chromatin organization
Sources:Amigo / QuickGO
Orthologs
Databases	NCBI: entry; OMA: entry
Species	Human	Mouse
Entrez	56254	109331
Ensembl	ENSG00000155827	ENSMUSG00000028309
UniProt	Q5VTR2	Q5DTM8
RefSeq (mRNA)	NM_019592	NM_001163263; NM_182999; NM_001356401
RefSeq (protein)	NP_062538	NP_001156735; NP_892044; NP_001343330
Location (UCSC)	Chr 9: 101.53 – 101.56 Mb	Chr 4: 49.63 – 49.66 Mb
PubMed search
- Wikidata
View/Edit Human	View/Edit Mouse

E3 ubiquitin-protein ligase BRE1A is an enzyme that in humans is encoded by the RNF20 gene.

The protein encoded by this gene shares similarity with BRE1 of S. cerevisiae. Yeast BRE1 is a ubiquitin ligase required for the ubiquitination of histone H2B and the methylation of histone H3.

== See also ==
- RING finger domain
