= PCGF6 =

Protein-coding gene in the species Homo sapiens

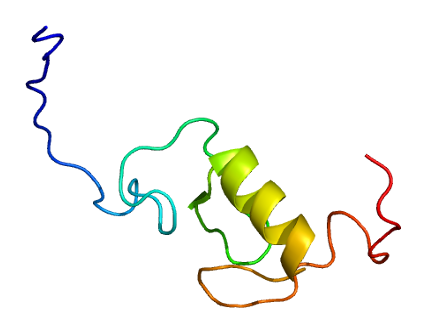

Identifiers
- Aliases: PCGF6, MBLR, RNF134, polycomb group ring finger 6
- External IDs: OMIM: 607816; MGI: 1918291; GeneCards: PCGF6
Available structures
PDB	Ortholog search: PDBe RCSB
PDB	List of PDB id codes 2DJB

Gene location (Human)
Chr.	Chromosome 10 (human)
Band	10q24.33	Start	103,302,796 bp
Band	10q24.33	End	103,351,144 bp

Gene location (Mouse)
Chr.	Chromosome 19 (mouse)
Band	19|19 C3	Start	47,022,056 bp
Band	19|19 C3	End	47,039,345 bp
RNA expression pattern
Bgee	Human / Mouse (ortholog); Top expressed in: gonad; ventricular zone; gastrocnemius muscle; testicle; skeletal muscle tissue; stromal cell of endometrium; smooth muscle tissue; ganglionic eminence; tibial arteries; muscle layer of sigmoid colon / Top expressed in: zygote; spermatocyte; primary oocyte; secondary oocyte; epiblast; seminiferous tubule; primitive streak; Rostral migratory stream; embryo; tail of embryo; More reference expression data
BioGPS	n/a
Gene ontology
Molecular function	DNA-binding transcription factor activity; DNA binding; RNA polymerase II transcription regulatory region sequence-specific DNA binding; protein binding; DNA-binding transcription repressor activity, RNA polymerase II-specific; metal ion binding
Cellular component	nucleus; PcG protein complex; nucleoplasm; PRC1 complex
Biological process	regulation of transcription, DNA-templated; negative regulation of transcription by RNA polymerase II; transcription, DNA-templated; histone H2A-K119 monoubiquitination; negative regulation of G0 to G1 transition; negative regulation of transcription, DNA-templated; inactivation of X chromosome by genetic imprinting
Sources:Amigo / QuickGO
Orthologs
Databases	NCBI: entry; OMA: entry
Species	Human	Mouse
Entrez	84108	71041
Ensembl	ENSG00000156374	ENSMUSG00000025050
UniProt	Q9BYE7	Q99NA9
RefSeq (mRNA)	NM_001011663; NM_032154	NM_027654; NM_001360632
RefSeq (protein)	NP_001011663; NP_115530	NP_081930; NP_001347561
Location (UCSC)	Chr 10: 103.3 – 103.35 Mb	Chr 19: 47.02 – 47.04 Mb
PubMed search
- Wikidata
View/Edit Human	View/Edit Mouse

Polycomb group RING finger protein 6 is a protein that in humans is encoded by the PCGF6 gene.

The protein encoded by this gene contains a RING finger motif, which is most closely related to those of polycomb group (PcG) proteins RNF110/MEL-18 and BMI1. PcG proteins are known to form protein complexes and function as transcription repressors. This protein has been shown to interact with some PcG proteins and act as a transcription repressor. The activity of this protein is found to be regulated by cell cycle dependent phosphorylation. Alternatively spliced transcript variants encoding different isoforms have been identified.
