= CCNB1IP1 =

Protein-coding gene in humans

Identifiers
- Aliases: CCNB1IP1, C14orf18, HEI10, cyclin B1 interacting protein 1
- External IDs: OMIM: 608249; MGI: 2685134; GeneCards: CCNB1IP1
Enzyme activity
EC #	BRENDA	ExPASy	KEGG	MetaCyc
2.3.2.27	↗	↗	↗	↗

Gene location (Human)
Chr.	Chromosome 14 (human)
Band	14q11.2	Start	20,311,368 bp
Band	14q11.2	End	20,333,312 bp

Gene location (Mouse)
Chr.	Chromosome 14 (mouse)
Band	14|14 C1	Start	51,026,705 bp
Band	14|14 C1	End	51,045,189 bp
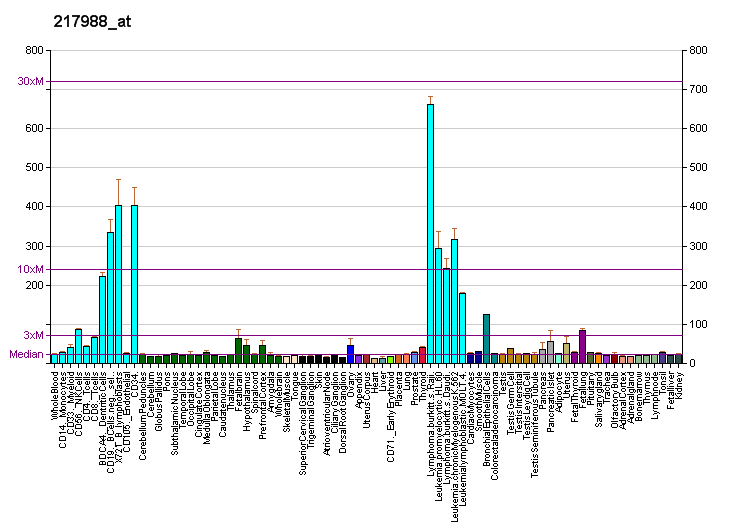
RNA expression pattern
Bgee	Human / Mouse (ortholog); Top expressed in: left ovary; ganglionic eminence; right ovary; gastric mucosa; cartilage tissue; ventricular zone; body of uterus; apex of heart; right auricle of heart; left ventricle / Top expressed in: epiblast; fetal liver hematopoietic progenitor cell; embryo; morula; spermatocyte; primitive streak; embryo; blastocyst; otic placode; primary oocyte; More reference expression data
BioGPS	More reference expression data
Gene ontology
Molecular function	protein binding; metal ion binding; ubiquitin protein ligase activity; transferase activity
Cellular component	condensed nuclear chromosome; synaptonemal complex; nucleus; chromosome
Biological process	reciprocal meiotic recombination; chiasma assembly; meiosis; blastocyst formation; protein ubiquitination; spermatid development
Sources:Amigo / QuickGO
Orthologs
Databases	NCBI: entry; OMA: entry
Species	Human	Mouse
Entrez	57820	239083
Ensembl	ENSG00000100814	ENSMUSG00000071470
UniProt	Q9NPC3	D3Z3K2
RefSeq (mRNA)	NM_182852; NM_021178; NM_182849; NM_182851	NM_001111119
RefSeq (protein)	NP_067001; NP_878269; NP_878272	NP_001104589
Location (UCSC)	Chr 14: 20.31 – 20.33 Mb	Chr 14: 51.03 – 51.05 Mb
PubMed search
- Wikidata
View/Edit Human	View/Edit Mouse

E3 ubiquitin-protein ligase CCNB1IP1 is an enzyme that in humans is encoded by the CCNB1IP1 gene.

HEI10 is a member of the E3 ubiquitin ligase family and functions in progression of the cell cycle through G(2)/M.[supplied by OMIM] It is considered a housekeeping gene.

During meiosis, crossing over between homologous chromosomes (homologs) facilitates accurate chromosome segregation. In mammals, the ring-domain protein CCNB1IP1, also known as HEI10, promotes crossing over between each pair of homologs during meiosis. Studies in the mouse showed that this pro-crossover ring-domain protein facilitates the homologous recombination and DNA repair processes that produce crossovers.
