= TOPORS =

Protein-coding gene in the species Homo sapiens

Identifiers
- Aliases: TOPORS, LUN, P53BP3, RP31, TP53BPL, TOP1 binding arginine/serine rich protein, TOP1 binding arginine/serine rich protein, E3 ubiquitin ligase
- External IDs: OMIM: 609507; MGI: 2146189; GeneCards: TOPORS
Enzyme activity
EC #	BRENDA	ExPASy	KEGG	MetaCyc
2.3.2.27	↗	↗	↗	↗

Gene location (Mouse)
Chr.	Chromosome 4 (mouse)
Band	4|4 A5	Start	40,259,601 bp
Band	4|4 A5	End	40,269,850 bp
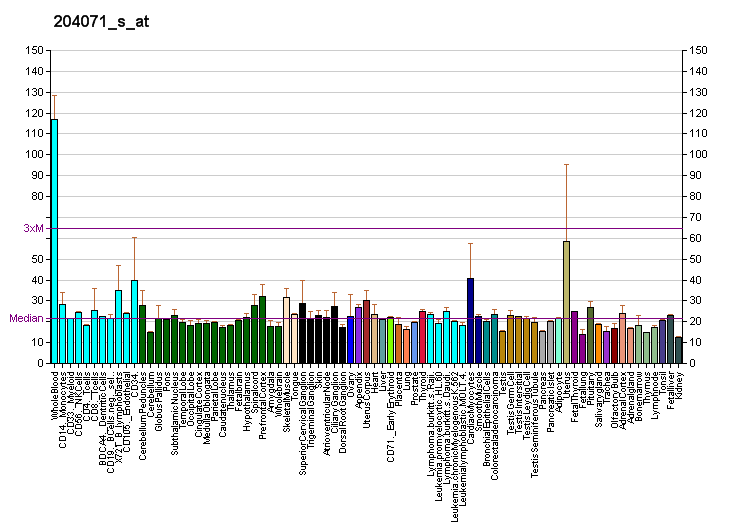
RNA expression pattern
Bgee	Human / Mouse (ortholog); Top expressed in: secondary oocyte; Achilles tendon; sperm; corpus epididymis; caput epididymis; trabecular bone; jejunal mucosa; seminal vesicula; oral cavity; bone marrow / Top expressed in: primitive streak; maxillary prominence; mandibular prominence; hand; medial ganglionic eminence; Gonadal ridge; endothelial cell of lymphatic vessel; left lung lobe; dermis; seminiferous tubule; More reference expression data
BioGPS	More reference expression data
Gene ontology
Molecular function	antigen binding; DNA binding; SUMO transferase activity; ubiquitin protein ligase activity; metal ion binding; ubiquitin-protein transferase activity; DNA topoisomerase binding; protein binding; transferase activity
Cellular component	ciliary basal body; PML body; nuclear speck; spindle pole; ubiquitin ligase complex; gamma-tubulin complex; photoreceptor connecting cilium; midbody; cytoplasmic dynein complex; centriole; nucleus; nucleoplasm
Biological process	intrinsic apoptotic signaling pathway in response to DNA damage by p53 class mediator; retina layer formation; ubiquitin-dependent protein catabolic process; protein polyubiquitination; negative regulation of apoptotic process; retinal cone cell development; protein monoubiquitination; photoreceptor cell outer segment organization; protein sumoylation; transcription, DNA-templated; cellular response to DNA damage stimulus; positive regulation of transcription, DNA-templated; protein K48-linked ubiquitination; regulation of cell population proliferation; positive regulation of ubiquitin-protein transferase activity; retinal rod cell development; intrinsic apoptotic signaling pathway in response to DNA damage; protein localization to nucleus; maintenance of protein location in nucleus; proteasome-mediated ubiquitin-dependent protein catabolic process
Sources:Amigo / QuickGO
Orthologs
Databases	NCBI: entry
Species	Human	Mouse
Entrez	10210	106021
Ensembl	n/a	ENSMUSG00000036822
UniProt	Q9NS56	Q80Z37
RefSeq (mRNA)	NM_005802; NM_001195622	NM_134097
RefSeq (protein)	NP_001182551; NP_005793	NP_598858
Location (UCSC)	n/a	Chr 4: 40.26 – 40.27 Mb
PubMed search
- Wikidata
View/Edit Human	View/Edit Mouse

E3 ubiquitin-protein ligase Topors is an enzyme that in humans is encoded by the TOPORS gene.
