= BRAP =

Protein-coding gene in the species Homo sapiens

Identifiers
- Aliases: BRAP, BRAP2, IMP, RNF52, BRCA1 associated protein
- External IDs: OMIM: 604986; MGI: 1919649; GeneCards: BRAP
Enzyme activity
EC #	BRENDA	ExPASy	KEGG	MetaCyc
2.3.2.27	↗	↗	↗	↗

Gene location (Human)
Chr.	Chromosome 12 (human)
Band	12q24.12	Start	111,642,146 bp
Band	12q24.12	End	111,685,956 bp

Gene location (Mouse)
Chr.	Chromosome 5 (mouse)
Band	5|5 F	Start	121,798,626 bp
Band	5|5 F	End	121,825,319 bp
RNA expression pattern
Bgee	Human / Mouse (ortholog); Top expressed in: left testis; right testis; secondary oocyte; sperm; buccal mucosa cell; gonad; Achilles tendon; gastrocnemius muscle; islet of Langerhans; testicle / Top expressed in: spermatid; spermatocyte; seminiferous tubule; right kidney; zygote; lumbar spinal ganglion; secondary oocyte; lip; dentate gyrus of hippocampal formation granule cell; left lobe of liver; More reference expression data
BioGPS	n/a
Gene ontology
Molecular function	ubiquitin protein ligase activity; zinc ion binding; metal ion binding; ubiquitin-protein transferase activity; protein binding; nuclear localization sequence binding; identical protein binding; nucleic acid binding; transferase activity
Cellular component	cytoplasm; nuclear membrane; ubiquitin ligase complex; cytosol
Biological process	MAPK cascade; protein ubiquitination; negative regulation of signal transduction; Ras protein signal transduction
Sources:Amigo / QuickGO
Orthologs
Databases	NCBI: entry; OMA: entry
Species	Human	Mouse
Entrez	8315	72399
Ensembl	ENSG00000089234	ENSMUSG00000029458
UniProt	Q7Z569	Q99MP8
RefSeq (mRNA)	NM_006768	NM_001289543; NM_001289544; NM_028227
RefSeq (protein)	NP_006759	NP_001276472; NP_001276473; NP_082503
Location (UCSC)	Chr 12: 111.64 – 111.69 Mb	Chr 5: 121.8 – 121.83 Mb
PubMed search
- Wikidata
View/Edit Human	View/Edit Mouse

BRCA1 associated protein is a protein that in humans is encoded by the BRAP gene.

== Function ==
The protein encoded by this gene was identified by its ability to bind to the nuclear localization signal of BRCA1 and other proteins. It is a cytoplasmic protein which may regulate nuclear targeting by retaining proteins with a nuclear localization signal in the cytoplasm. [provided by RefSeq, Jul 2008].
