= RNF139 =

Protein-coding gene in the species Homo sapiens

Identifiers
- Aliases: RNF139, HRCA1, RCA1, TRC8, ring finger protein 139
- External IDs: OMIM: 603046; MGI: 1923091; GeneCards: RNF139
Enzyme activity
EC #	BRENDA	ExPASy	KEGG	MetaCyc
2.3.2.27	↗	↗	↗	↗

Gene location (Human)
Chr.	Chromosome 8 (human)
Band	8q24.13	Start	124,474,880 bp
Band	8q24.13	End	124,488,618 bp

Gene location (Mouse)
Chr.	Chromosome 15 (mouse)
Band	15|15 D1	Start	58,761,078 bp
Band	15|15 D1	End	58,778,906 bp
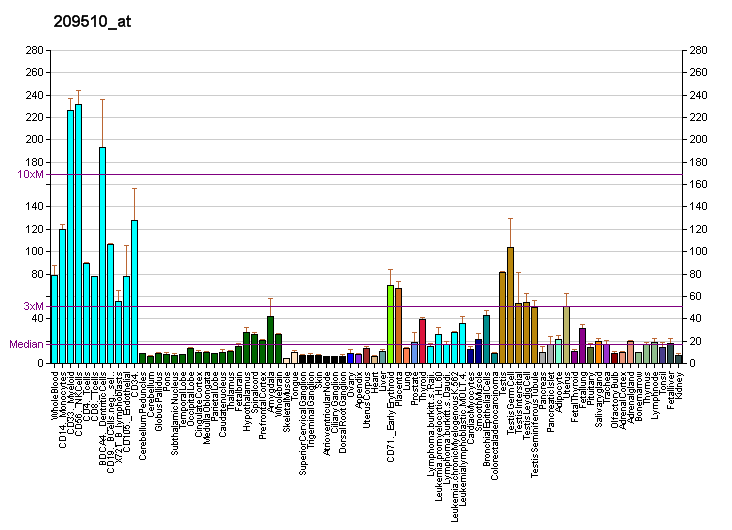
RNA expression pattern
Bgee	Human / Mouse (ortholog); Top expressed in: sperm; left testis; right testis; endothelial cell; parietal pleura; visceral pleura; cartilage tissue; tail of epididymis; synovial joint; Achilles tendon / Top expressed in: seminiferous tubule; medullary collecting duct; spermatid; renal corpuscle; interventricular septum; otolith organ; utricle; medial head of gastrocnemius muscle; knee joint; spermatocyte; More reference expression data
BioGPS	More reference expression data
Gene ontology
Molecular function	ubiquitin protein ligase activity; zinc ion binding; metal ion binding; ubiquitin-protein transferase activity; ubiquitin-like protein transferase activity; protease binding; protein binding; transferase activity; ligase activity; signaling receptor activity
Cellular component	integral component of membrane; membrane; endoplasmic reticulum; Derlin-1 retrotranslocation complex; endoplasmic reticulum membrane; endoplasmic reticulum quality control compartment; endomembrane system
Biological process	negative regulation of translation; ERAD pathway; regulation of ER to Golgi vesicle-mediated transport; regulation of protein ubiquitination; protein polyubiquitination; regulation of protein processing; positive regulation of ubiquitin-dependent protein catabolic process; protein destabilization; protein ubiquitination; negative regulation of cell population proliferation; proteasome-mediated ubiquitin-dependent protein catabolic process; endoplasmic reticulum mannose trimming; signal transduction
Sources:Amigo / QuickGO
Orthologs
Databases	NCBI: entry; OMA: entry
Species	Human	Mouse
Entrez	11236	75841
Ensembl	ENSG00000170881	ENSMUSG00000037075
UniProt	Q8WU17	Q7TMV1
RefSeq (mRNA)	NM_007218	NM_175226
RefSeq (protein)	NP_009149	NP_780435
Location (UCSC)	Chr 8: 124.47 – 124.49 Mb	Chr 15: 58.76 – 58.78 Mb
PubMed search
- Wikidata
View/Edit Human	View/Edit Mouse

RING finger protein 139, also known as TRC8, is a protein that in humans is encoded by the RNF139 gene.

The protein encoded by this gene is a multi-membrane spanning protein containing a RING-H2 finger. This protein is located in the endoplasmic reticulum, and has been shown to possess ubiquitin ligase activity. This gene was found to be interrupted by a t(3:8) translocation in a family with hereditary renal and non-medullary thyroid cancer. Studies of the Drosophila counterpart suggested that this protein may interact with tumor suppressor protein VHL, as well as with COPS5/JAB1, a protein responsible for the degradation of tumor suppressor CDKN1B/P27KIP].
