= Deltex e3 ubiquitin ligase 4 =

Protein-coding gene in the species Homo sapiens

DTX4

Identifiers
- Aliases: DTX4, RNF155, deltex 4, E3 ubiquitin ligase, deltex E3 ubiquitin ligase 4
- External IDs: OMIM: 616110; MGI: 2672905; GeneCards: DTX4
Enzyme activity
| EC # | BRENDA | ExPASy | KEGG | MetaCyc |
|---|---|---|---|---|
| 2.3.2.27 | ↗ | ↗ | ↗ | ↗ |

Gene location (Mouse)
| Chr. | Chromosome 19 (mouse) |
| Band | 19|19 A | Start | 12,443,702 bp |
| Band | 19|19 A | End | 12,478,818 bp |
RNA expression pattern
| Bgee | Human / Mouse (ortholog); Top expressed in: inferior olivary nucleus; olfactory bulb; inferior ganglion of vagus nerve; subthalamic nucleus; spinal cord; superior vestibular nucleus; ventral tegmental area; pons; trigeminal ganglion; bronchus / Top expressed in: otolith organ; utricle; transitional epithelium of urinary bladder; white adipose tissue; efferent ductule; Gonadal ridge; migratory enteric neural crest cell; superior cervical ganglion; central gray substance of midbrain; skin of abdomen; More reference expression data |
| BioGPS | n/a |
Gene ontology
| Molecular function | zinc ion binding; metal ion binding; ubiquitin-protein transferase activity; transferase activity |
| Cellular component | cytosol; cytoplasm |
| Biological process | protein ubiquitination; regulation of type I interferon production; Notch signaling pathway |
Sources:Amigo / QuickGO
Orthologs
| Databases | NCBI: entry |
| Species | Human | Mouse |
| Entrez | 23220 | 207521 |
| Ensembl | n/a | ENSMUSG00000039982 |
| UniProt | Q9Y2E6 | Q6PDK8 |
| RefSeq (mRNA) | NM_001300727; NM_015177 | NM_172442; NM_001401392 |
| RefSeq (protein) | NP_001287656; NP_055992 | NP_766030; NP_001388321 |
| Location (UCSC) | n/a | Chr 19: 12.44 – 12.48 Mb |
| PubMed search |
- Wikidata
| View/Edit Human | View/Edit Mouse |

Deltex E3 ubiquitin ligase 4 is a protein that in humans is encoded by the DTX4 gene.
