= MARCH6 =

Protein-coding gene in the species Homo sapiens

MARCHF6

Identifiers
- Aliases: MARCHF6, DOA10, MARCH-VI, RNF176, TEB4, membrane associated ring-CH-type finger 6, MARCH6, FAME3
- External IDs: OMIM: 613297; MGI: 2442773; GeneCards: MARCHF6
Enzyme activity
EC #	BRENDA	ExPASy	KEGG	MetaCyc
2.3.2.27	↗	↗	↗	↗

Gene location (Human)
Chr.	Chromosome 5 (human)
Band	5p15.2	Start	10,353,695 bp
Band	5p15.2	End	10,440,388 bp

Gene location (Mouse)
Chr.	Chromosome 15 (mouse)
Band	15|15 B2	Start	31,456,037 bp
Band	15|15 B2	End	31,531,199 bp
RNA expression pattern
Bgee	Human / Mouse (ortholog); Top expressed in: Brodmann area 23; endothelial cell; glutes; Region I of hippocampus proper; middle temporal gyrus; cerebellar vermis; dorsal motor nucleus of vagus nerve; corpus callosum; pons; postcentral gyrus / Top expressed in: extensor digitorum longus muscle; cingulate gyrus; plantaris muscle; lateral septal nucleus; median eminence; ventromedial nucleus; subiculum; arcuate nucleus; amygdala; anterior amygdaloid area; More reference expression data
BioGPS	n/a
Gene ontology
Molecular function	enzyme binding; ubiquitin-specific protease binding; zinc ion binding; ubiquitin conjugating enzyme binding; ubiquitin protein ligase activity; metal ion binding; ubiquitin-protein transferase activity; transferase activity; protein binding
Cellular component	integral component of membrane; integral component of endoplasmic reticulum membrane; ER ubiquitin ligase complex; membrane; endoplasmic reticulum; endoplasmic reticulum membrane; endoplasmic reticulum quality control compartment
Biological process	protein K48-linked ubiquitination; proteasomal protein catabolic process; ERAD pathway; protein ubiquitination; endoplasmic reticulum mannose trimming; ubiquitin-dependent ERAD pathway; proteasome-mediated ubiquitin-dependent protein catabolic process
Sources:Amigo / QuickGO
Orthologs
Databases	NCBI: entry; OMA: entry
Species	Human	Mouse
Entrez	10299	223455
Ensembl	ENSG00000145495	ENSMUSG00000039100
UniProt	O60337	Q6ZQ89
RefSeq (mRNA)	NM_001270660; NM_001270661; NM_005885	NM_172606
RefSeq (protein)	NP_001257589; NP_001257590; NP_005876	NP_766194; NP_001389808
Location (UCSC)	Chr 5: 10.35 – 10.44 Mb	Chr 15: 31.46 – 31.53 Mb
PubMed search
- Wikidata
View/Edit Human	View/Edit Mouse

E3 ubiquitin-protein ligase MARCH6 is an enzyme that in humans is encoded by the MARCH6 gene.

== Gene name error in Excel ==
Like the other MARCH and septin genes, care must be exercised when analyzing genetic data containing the MARCH6 gene in Microsoft Excel. This is due to Excel's autocorrect feature treating the text "MARCH6" as a date and converting it to a standard date format. The original text cannot be recovered as a result of the conversion. A 2016 study found up to 19.6% of all papers in selected journals to be affected by the gene name error. The issue can be prevented by using an alias name (such as MARCHF6), prepending with an apostrophe ('), or preformatting the cell as text.

== See also ==
- List of EC numbers (EC 3)
