= CHFR =

Enzyme

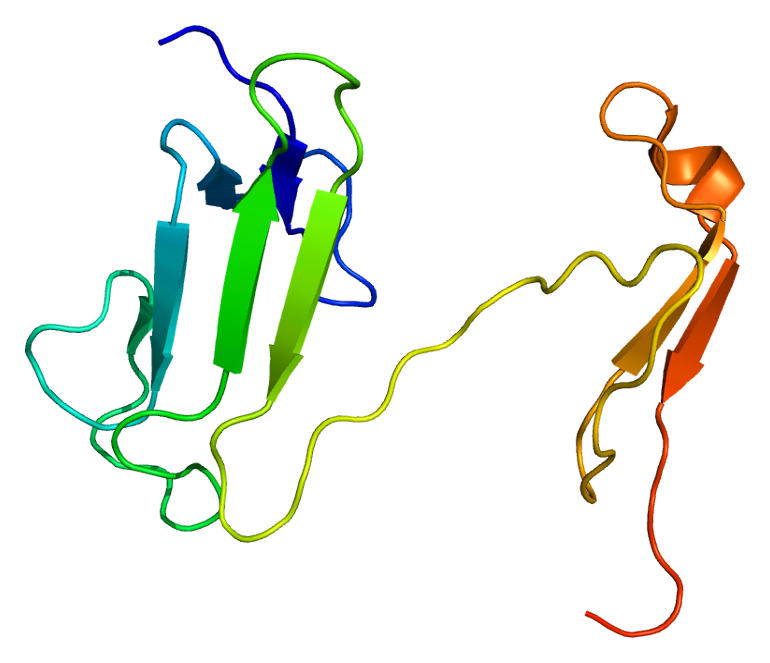

Identifiers
- Aliases: CHFR, RNF116, RNF196, checkpoint with forkhead and ring finger domains, E3 ubiquitin protein ligase, checkpoint with forkhead and ring finger domains
- External IDs: OMIM: 605209; MGI: 2444898; GeneCards: CHFR
Available structures
| PDB | Ortholog search: PDBe RCSB |
| PDB | List of PDB id codes 1LGP, 1LGQ, 2XOC, 2XOY, 2XOZ, 2XP0 |
Enzyme activity
| EC # | BRENDA | ExPASy | KEGG | MetaCyc |
|---|---|---|---|---|
| 2.3.2.27 | ↗ | ↗ | ↗ | ↗ |

Gene location (Human)
| Chr. | Chromosome 12 (human) |
| Band | 12q24.33 | Start | 132,822,187 bp |
| Band | 12q24.33 | End | 132,956,304 bp |

Gene location (Mouse)
| Chr. | Chromosome 5 (mouse) |
| Band | 5|5 F | Start | 110,283,708 bp |
| Band | 5|5 F | End | 110,319,838 bp |
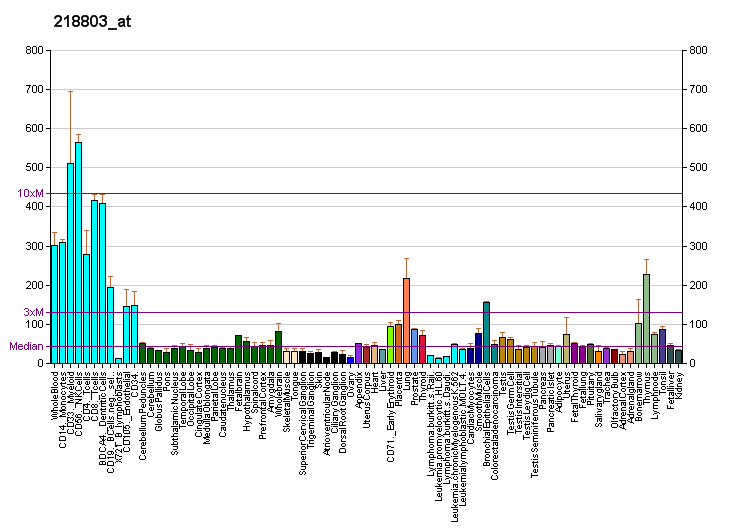
RNA expression pattern
| Bgee | Human / Mouse (ortholog); Top expressed in: granulocyte; monocyte; skin of hip; sural nerve; blood; right testis; left testis; gastric mucosa; upper lobe of left lung; spleen / Top expressed in: spermatocyte; trigeminal ganglion; medullary collecting duct; endocardial cushion; atrioventricular valve; gastrula; blood; neural layer of retina; thymus; pineal gland; More reference expression data |
| BioGPS | More reference expression data |
Gene ontology
| Molecular function | nucleotide binding; protein binding; ubiquitin protein ligase activity; metal ion binding; ubiquitin-protein transferase activity; transferase activity |
| Cellular component | PML body; nucleus |
| Biological process | mitotic cell cycle checkpoint signaling; cell division; mitotic cell cycle; cell cycle; protein polyubiquitination; modification-dependent protein catabolic process; positive regulation of protein ubiquitination; protein destabilization; positive regulation of proteasomal ubiquitin-dependent protein catabolic process; ubiquitin-dependent protein catabolic process; protein ubiquitination |
Sources:Amigo / QuickGO
Orthologs
| Databases | NCBI: entry; OMA: entry |
| Species | Human | Mouse |
| Entrez | 55743 | 231600 |
| Ensembl | ENSG00000072609 | ENSMUSG00000014668 |
| UniProt | Q96EP1 | Q810L3 |
| RefSeq (mRNA) | NM_018223; NM_001161344; NM_001161345; NM_001161346; NM_001161347 | NM_001289577; NM_001289578; NM_001289579; NM_001289580; NM_172717 |
| RefSeq (protein) | NP_001154816; NP_001154817; NP_001154818; NP_001154819; NP_060693 | NP_001276506; NP_001276507; NP_001276508; NP_001276509; NP_766305 |
| Location (UCSC) | Chr 12: 132.82 – 132.96 Mb | Chr 5: 110.28 – 110.32 Mb |
| PubMed search |
- Wikidata
| View/Edit Human | View/Edit Mouse |

E3 ubiquitin-protein ligase CHFR is an enzyme that in humans is encoded by the CHFR gene.

CHFR is recruited to sites of DNA damage and participates in the DNA damage response. CHFR has an important role in the survival of male premeiotic germ cells. About 30% of male CHFR knockout mice are infertile. In these knockout mice spermatogenesis onset is delayed and apoptosis in premeiotic germ cells is significantly increased. When these mice are 3 months old there is a complete loss of germ cells in their testes.
