= UHRF2 =

Protein-coding gene in the species Homo sapiens

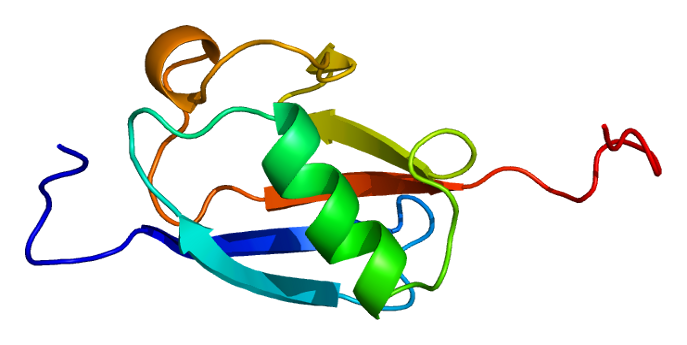

Identifiers
- Aliases: UHRF2, NIRF, RNF107, URF2, TDRD23, ubiquitin like with PHD and ring finger domains 2
- External IDs: OMIM: 615211; MGI: 1923718; GeneCards: UHRF2
Available structures
PDB	Ortholog search: PDBe RCSB
PDB	List of PDB id codes 1WY8, 1Z6U, 2E6S, 3OLN, 4PW5, 4PW6, 4PW7, 4TVR
Enzyme activity
EC #	BRENDA	ExPASy	KEGG	MetaCyc
2.3.2.27	↗	↗	↗	↗

Gene location (Human)
Chr.	Chromosome 9 (human)
Band	9p24.1	Start	6,413,151 bp
Band	9p24.1	End	6,507,054 bp

Gene location (Mouse)
Chr.	Chromosome 19 (mouse)
Band	19|19 C1	Start	30,007,913 bp
Band	19|19 C1	End	30,071,122 bp
RNA expression pattern
Bgee	Human / Mouse (ortholog); Top expressed in: secondary oocyte; pancreatic epithelial cell; Achilles tendon; tibia; thymus; sperm; ventricular zone; germinal epithelium; bone marrow; bone marrow cell / Top expressed in: superior cervical ganglion; hand; tail of embryo; ventricular zone; genital tubercle; primitive streak; lens; neural layer of retina; epiblast; thymus; More reference expression data
BioGPS	n/a
Gene ontology
Molecular function	DNA binding; histone binding; protein binding; metal ion binding; ubiquitin protein ligase activity; ubiquitin-protein transferase activity; transferase activity; SUMO transferase activity
Cellular component	nucleus; nucleoplasm
Biological process	protein autoubiquitination; regulation of DNA methylation-dependent heterochromatin assembly; cell cycle; cell differentiation; cell population proliferation; maintenance of DNA methylation; protein ubiquitination; regulation of cell cycle; protein sumoylation
Sources:Amigo / QuickGO
Orthologs
Databases	NCBI: entry; OMA: entry
Species	Human	Mouse
Entrez	115426	109113
Ensembl	ENSG00000147854	ENSMUSG00000024817
UniProt	Q96PU4	Q7TMI3
RefSeq (mRNA)	NM_152896; NM_152306	NM_144873
RefSeq (protein)	NP_690856	NP_659122
Location (UCSC)	Chr 9: 6.41 – 6.51 Mb	Chr 19: 30.01 – 30.07 Mb
PubMed search
- Wikidata
View/Edit Human	View/Edit Mouse

E3 ubiquitin-protein ligase UHRF2 is an enzyme that in humans is encoded by the UHRF2 gene.

This gene encodes a nuclear protein which is involved in cell-cycle regulation. The encoded protein is a ubiquitin-ligase capable of ubiquinating PCNP (PEST-containing nuclear protein), and together they may play a role in tumorigenesis.
