= MARCH7 =

Protein-coding gene in the species Homo sapiens

MARCHF7

Identifiers
- Aliases: MARCHF7, AXO, AXOT, MARCH-VII, RNF177, membrane associated ring-CH-type finger 7, MARCH7
- External IDs: OMIM: 613334; MGI: 1931053; GeneCards: MARCHF7
Enzyme activity
EC #	BRENDA	ExPASy	KEGG	MetaCyc
2.3.2.27	↗	↗	↗	↗

Gene location (Human)
Chr.	Chromosome 2 (human)
Band	2q24.2	Start	159,712,457 bp
Band	2q24.2	End	159,771,027 bp
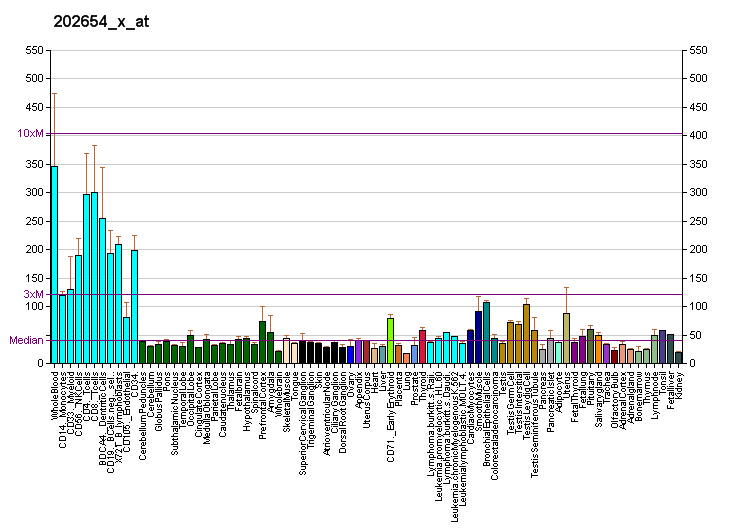

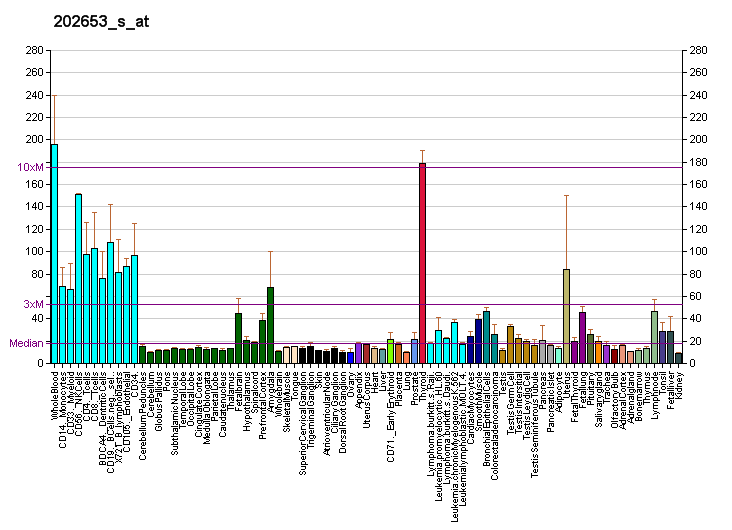
RNA expression pattern
Bgee	Human / Mouse (ortholog); Top expressed in: Achilles tendon; amniotic fluid; ventricular zone; gingival epithelium; secondary oocyte; oral cavity; germinal epithelium; ganglionic eminence; gallbladder; epithelium of nasopharynx / n/a; More reference expression data
BioGPS	More reference expression data
Gene ontology
Molecular function	zinc ion binding; metal ion binding; transferase activity; enzyme binding; ubiquitin conjugating enzyme binding; ubiquitin binding; MDM2/MDM4 family protein binding; protein binding
Cellular component	nucleus; cytosol; plasma membrane
Biological process	negative regulation of T cell proliferation; regulation of tolerance induction; protein ubiquitination; positive regulation of cell population proliferation; negative regulation of DNA damage response, signal transduction by p53 class mediator; protein stabilization; protein autoubiquitination; negative regulation of proteasomal protein catabolic process; negative regulation of intrinsic apoptotic signaling pathway in response to DNA damage by p53 class mediator; positive regulation of protein polyubiquitination; negative regulation of protein autoubiquitination
Sources:Amigo / QuickGO
Orthologs
Databases	NCBI: entry; OMA: entry
Species	Human	Mouse
Entrez	64844	57438
Ensembl	ENSG00000136536	n/a
UniProt	Q9H992	Q9WV66
RefSeq (mRNA)	NM_001282805; NM_001282806; NM_001282807; NM_022826	NM_020575
RefSeq (protein)	NP_001269734; NP_001269735; NP_001269736; NP_073737; NP_001363163 NP_001363164; NP_001363165; NP_001363166; NP_001363167; NP_001363168; NP_001363169; NP_001363170; NP_001363171; NP_001363172; NP_001363173; NP_001363174; NP_001363175; NP_001363176; NP_001363177; NP_001363178; NP_001363179; NP_001363180; NP_001363181; NP_001363182; NP_001363183; NP_001363184	NP_065600
Location (UCSC)	Chr 2: 159.71 – 159.77 Mb	n/a
PubMed search
- Wikidata
View/Edit Human	View/Edit Mouse

E3 ubiquitin-protein ligase MARCH7 is an enzyme that in humans is encoded by the MARCH7 gene.
