= ZNF451 =

Protein-coding gene in humans

Identifiers
- Aliases: ZNF451, COASTER, dJ417I1.1, zinc finger protein 451, ZATT
- External IDs: OMIM: 615708; MGI: 2137896; GeneCards: ZNF451
Available structures
PDB	Ortholog search: PDBe RCSB
PDB	List of PDB id codes 5D2M

Gene location (Human)
Chr.	Chromosome 6 (human)
Band	6p12.1	Start	57,086,844 bp
Band	6p12.1	End	57,170,305 bp

Gene location (Mouse)
Chr.	Chromosome 1 (mouse)
Band	1 B|1 12.81 cM	Start	33,800,626 bp
Band	1 B|1 12.81 cM	End	33,853,676 bp
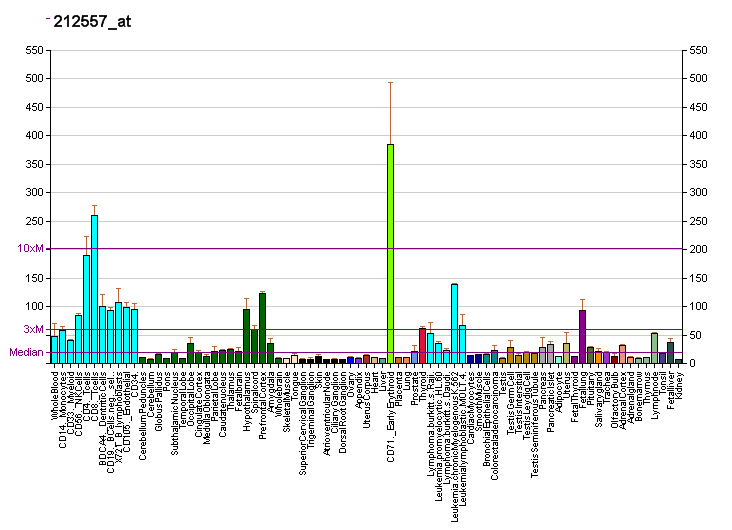
RNA expression pattern
Bgee	Human / Mouse (ortholog); Top expressed in: corpus callosum; Achilles tendon; trabecular bone; tibia; right testis; bone marrow; nipple; left testis; lower lobe of lung; sural nerve / Top expressed in: spermatid; Rostral migratory stream; medial ganglionic eminence; zygote; secondary oocyte; tail of embryo; genital tubercle; Gonadal ridge; primary oocyte; trigeminal ganglion; More reference expression data
BioGPS	More reference expression data
Gene ontology
Molecular function	SUMO ligase activity; transcription corepressor activity; protein binding; metal ion binding; nucleic acid binding; transferase activity; DNA-binding transcription factor activity, RNA polymerase II-specific; RNA polymerase II core promoter sequence-specific DNA binding
Cellular component	PML body; nucleus; nucleoplasm; histone methyltransferase complex
Biological process	negative regulation of transcription initiation from RNA polymerase II promoter; negative regulation of histone H3-K9 acetylation; regulation of transcription, DNA-templated; negative regulation of transforming growth factor beta receptor signaling pathway; protein sumoylation; transcription, DNA-templated; regulation of gene expression
Sources:Amigo / QuickGO
Orthologs
Databases	NCBI: entry; OMA: entry
Species	Human	Mouse
Entrez	26036	98403
Ensembl	ENSG00000112200	ENSMUSG00000042197
UniProt	Q9Y4E5	Q8C0P7
RefSeq (mRNA)	NM_001031623; NM_001257273; NM_015555	NM_001290699; NM_001290700; NM_133817; NM_001359274; NM_001359275
RefSeq (protein)	NP_001026794; NP_001244202; NP_056370	NP_001277628; NP_001277629; NP_598578; NP_001346203; NP_001346204
Location (UCSC)	Chr 6: 57.09 – 57.17 Mb	Chr 1: 33.8 – 33.85 Mb
PubMed search
- Wikidata
View/Edit Human	View/Edit Mouse

Zinc finger protein 451 is a novel nuclear protein that in humans is encoded by the ZNF451 gene.
