= Deltex E3 ubiquitin ligase 3 =

Protein-coding gene in humans

DTX3

Identifiers
- Aliases: DTX3, RNF154, deltex3, deltex 3, E3 ubiquitin ligase, deltex E3 ubiquitin ligase 3
- External IDs: OMIM: 613142; MGI: 2135752; GeneCards: DTX3
Enzyme activity
EC #	BRENDA	ExPASy	KEGG	MetaCyc
2.3.2.27	↗	↗	↗	↗

Gene location (Human)
Chr.	Chromosome 12 (human)
Band	12q13.3	Start	57,604,622 bp
Band	12q13.3	End	57,609,804 bp

Gene location (Mouse)
Chr.	Chromosome 10 (mouse)
Band	10|10 D3	Start	127,190,378 bp
Band	10|10 D3	End	127,195,728 bp
RNA expression pattern
Bgee	Human / Mouse (ortholog); Top expressed in: right hemisphere of cerebellum; anterior pituitary; right frontal lobe; right uterine tube; endothelial cell; left ovary; body of uterus; right ovary; anterior cingulate cortex; nucleus accumbens / Top expressed in: neural layer of retina; superior frontal gyrus; primary visual cortex; dentate gyrus of hippocampal formation granule cell; cerebellar cortex; ventricular zone; habenula; dorsomedial hypothalamic nucleus; piriform cortex; spermatocyte; More reference expression data
BioGPS	n/a
Gene ontology
Molecular function	protein binding; metal ion binding; transferase activity; zinc ion binding
Cellular component	cytoplasm
Biological process	Notch signaling pathway; protein ubiquitination
Sources:Amigo / QuickGO
Orthologs
Databases	NCBI: entry; OMA: entry
Species	Human	Mouse
Entrez	196403	80904
Ensembl	ENSG00000178498	ENSMUSG00000040415
UniProt	Q8N9I9	Q80V91
RefSeq (mRNA)	NM_001286245; NM_001286246; NM_178502	NM_030714; NM_001368332
RefSeq (protein)	NP_001273174; NP_001273175; NP_848597	NP_109639; NP_001355261
Location (UCSC)	Chr 12: 57.6 – 57.61 Mb	Chr 10: 127.19 – 127.2 Mb
PubMed search
- Wikidata
View/Edit Human	View/Edit Mouse

Probable E3 ubiquitin-protein ligase DTX3 is a protein that in humans is encoded by the DTX3 gene. It is expressed in three isoform variants differing on the N-terminal end: DTX3a, DTX3b, and DTX3c. DTX3a and DTX3b have distinct sets of 7 or 10 N-terminal amino acids, while DTX3c has both consecutively with one amino acid substitution.

== Function ==
DTX3 functions as an E3 ubiquitin ligase. Most but not all studies have found it to have a tumor-suppressing effect on human cancer: exceptions may be due to the failure to distinguish between different isoforms.
