= RNF13 =

Protein-coding gene in the species Homo sapiens

Identifiers
- Aliases: RNF13, RZF, ring finger protein 13, EIEE73, DEE73
- External IDs: OMIM: 609247; MGI: 1346341; GeneCards: RNF13
Enzyme activity
EC #	BRENDA	ExPASy	KEGG	MetaCyc
2.3.2.27	↗	↗	↗	↗

Gene location (Human)
Chr.	Chromosome 3 (human)
Band	3q25.1	Start	149,812,770 bp
Band	3q25.1	End	149,962,139 bp

Gene location (Mouse)
Chr.	Chromosome 3 (mouse)
Band	3|3 D	Start	57,643,483 bp
Band	3|3 D	End	57,742,654 bp
RNA expression pattern
Bgee	Human / Mouse (ortholog); Top expressed in: corpus callosum; Achilles tendon; inferior ganglion of vagus nerve; C1 segment; subthalamic nucleus; parotid gland; optic nerve; retinal pigment epithelium; external globus pallidus; pars reticulata / Top expressed in: retinal pigment epithelium; deep cerebellar nuclei; sciatic nerve; globus pallidus; iris; pontine nuclei; lateral geniculate nucleus; ventral tegmental area; ciliary body; stroma of bone marrow; More reference expression data
BioGPS	n/a
Gene ontology
Molecular function	metal ion binding; protein binding; ubiquitin protein ligase activity; ubiquitin-protein transferase activity; transferase activity; zinc ion binding
Cellular component	integral component of membrane; lysosomal membrane; Golgi membrane; nuclear inner membrane; endosome; lysosome; Golgi apparatus; endoplasmic reticulum membrane; endoplasmic reticulum; late endosome membrane; nucleus; membrane; nucleoplasm; cytosol; intracellular membrane-bounded organelle
Biological process	protein ubiquitination; protein autoubiquitination; ubiquitin-dependent protein catabolic process
Sources:Amigo / QuickGO
Orthologs
Databases	NCBI: entry; OMA: entry
Species	Human	Mouse
Entrez	11342	24017
Ensembl	ENSG00000082996	ENSMUSG00000036503
UniProt	O43567	O54965
RefSeq (mRNA)	NM_007282; NM_183381; NM_183382; NM_183383; NM_183384 NM_001378285; NM_001378286; NM_001378287; NM_001378288; NM_001378289; NM_001378290; NM_001378291	NM_001113413; NM_011883; NM_001304454; NM_001304456; NM_001357080
RefSeq (protein)	NP_009213; NP_899237; NP_899239; NP_001365214; NP_001365215 NP_001365216; NP_001365217; NP_001365218; NP_001365219; NP_001365220	NP_001106884; NP_001291383; NP_001291385; NP_036013; NP_001344009
Location (UCSC)	Chr 3: 149.81 – 149.96 Mb	Chr 3: 57.64 – 57.74 Mb
PubMed search
- Wikidata
View/Edit Human	View/Edit Mouse

RING finger protein 13 is a protein that in humans is encoded by the RNF13 gene.

The protein encoded by this gene contains a RING zinc finger, a motif known to be involved in protein-protein interactions. The specific function of this gene has not yet been determined. Multiple alternatively spliced transcript variants encoding distinct isoforms have been reported.
