= RNF122 =

Protein-coding gene in the species Homo sapiens

Identifiers
- Aliases: RNF122, ring finger protein 122
- External IDs: MGI: 1916117; GeneCards: RNF122

Gene location (Human)
Chr.	Chromosome 8 (human)
Band	8p12	Start	33,547,754 bp
Band	8p12	End	33,567,128 bp

Gene location (Mouse)
Chr.	Chromosome 8 (mouse)
Band	8|8 A3	Start	31,601,848 bp
Band	8|8 A3	End	31,621,510 bp
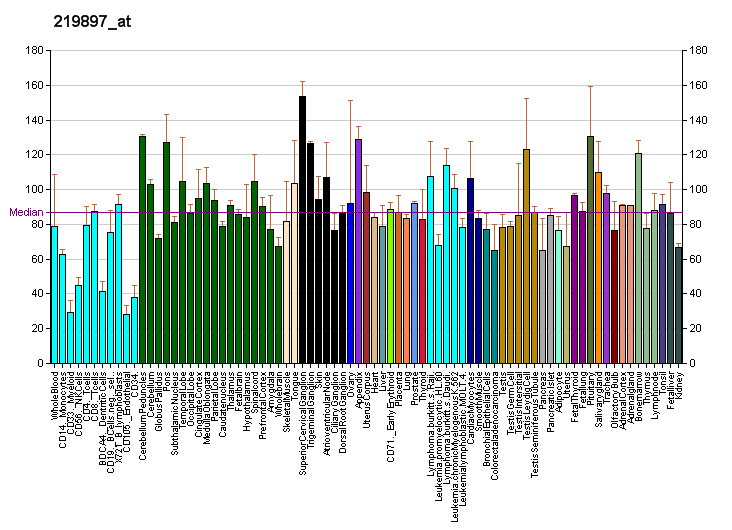
RNA expression pattern
Bgee	Human / Mouse (ortholog); Top expressed in: left uterine tube; right ovary; left ovary; muscle of thigh; ganglionic eminence; right auricle of heart; gastrocnemius muscle; right uterine tube; granulocyte; upper lobe of left lung / Top expressed in: zygote; hand; Rostral migratory stream; maxillary prominence; mandibular prominence; primary oocyte; genital tubercle; superior cervical ganglion; secondary oocyte; ganglionic eminence; More reference expression data
BioGPS	More reference expression data
Gene ontology
Molecular function	ubiquitin protein ligase activity; metal ion binding; protein binding
Cellular component	integral component of membrane; Golgi apparatus; membrane; endoplasmic reticulum; endomembrane system; cytoplasm
Biological process	proteasome-mediated ubiquitin-dependent protein catabolic process; protein polyubiquitination; protein ubiquitination; negative regulation of mitochondrial membrane potential; positive regulation of apoptotic process; protein autoubiquitination
Sources:Amigo / QuickGO
Orthologs
Databases	NCBI: entry; OMA: entry
Species	Human	Mouse
Entrez	79845	68867
Ensembl	ENSG00000133874	ENSMUSG00000039328
UniProt	Q9H9V4	Q8BP31
RefSeq (mRNA)	NM_024787	NM_175136; NM_001368373; NM_001368374; NM_001368375
RefSeq (protein)	NP_079063	NP_780345; NP_001355302; NP_001355303; NP_001355304
Location (UCSC)	Chr 8: 33.55 – 33.57 Mb	Chr 8: 31.6 – 31.62 Mb
PubMed search
- Wikidata
View/Edit Human	View/Edit Mouse

RING finger protein 122 is a protein that in humans is encoded by the RNF122 gene.

The protein encoded by this gene contains a RING finger, a motif present in a variety of functionally distinct proteins and known to be involved in protein-protein and protein-DNA interactions.
