= RNF39 =

Protein-coding gene in the species Homo sapiens

Identifiers
- Aliases: RNF39, HZF, HZFW, LIRF, ring finger protein 39, FAP216
- External IDs: OMIM: 607524; MGI: 2156378; GeneCards: RNF39
Enzyme activity
EC #	BRENDA	ExPASy	KEGG	MetaCyc
2.3.2.27	↗	↗	↗	↗

Gene location (Human)
Chr.	Chromosome 6 (human)
Band	6p22.1	Start	30,070,266 bp
Band	6p22.1	End	30,075,849 bp

Gene location (Mouse)
Chr.	Chromosome 17 (mouse)
Band	17|17 B1	Start	37,253,810 bp
Band	17|17 B1	End	37,258,878 bp
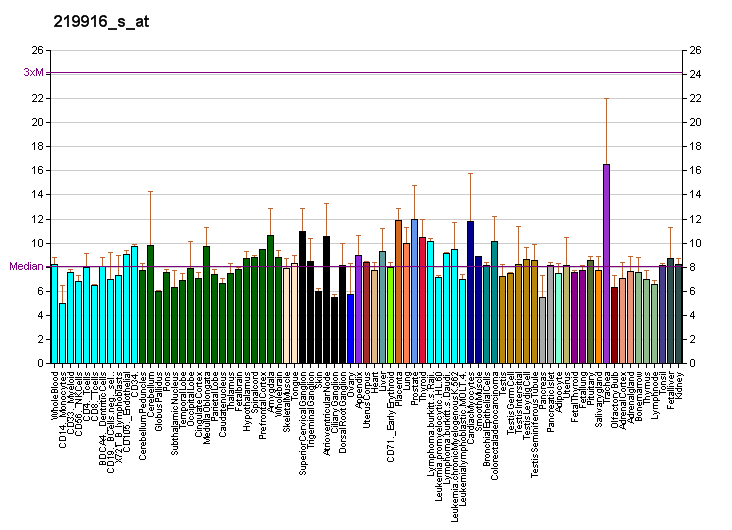
RNA expression pattern
Bgee	Human / Mouse (ortholog); Top expressed in: skin of abdomen; skin of leg; minor salivary glands; vagina; olfactory zone of nasal mucosa; prostate; right uterine tube; testicle; body of stomach; ectocervix / Top expressed in: skin of abdomen; lip; esophagus; skin of external ear; skin of back; conjunctival fornix; hair follicle; decidua; gastrula; right lung lobe; More reference expression data
BioGPS	More reference expression data
Gene ontology
Molecular function	metal ion binding
Cellular component	cytoplasm; cellular component
Biological process	biological process
Sources:Amigo / QuickGO
Orthologs
Databases	NCBI: entry; OMA: entry
Species	Human	Mouse
Entrez	80352	386454
Ensembl	ENSG00000230467; ENSG00000206500; ENSG00000204618; ENSG00000237733; ENSG00000227171 ENSG00000235022; ENSG00000236967; ENSG00000230332	ENSMUSG00000036492
UniProt	Q9H2S5	n/a
RefSeq (mRNA)	NM_170770; NM_025236; NM_170769	NM_001099632
RefSeq (protein)	NP_079512; NP_739575	n/a
Location (UCSC)	Chr 6: 30.07 – 30.08 Mb	Chr 17: 37.25 – 37.26 Mb
PubMed search
- Wikidata
View/Edit Human	View/Edit Mouse

RING finger protein 39 is a protein that in humans is encoded by the RNF39 gene.

This gene lies within the major histocompatibility complex class I region on chromosome 6. Studies of a similar rat protein suggest that this gene encodes a protein that plays a role in an early phase of synaptic plasticity. Alternative splicing results in three transcript variants encoding different isoforms.
