= PCGF5 =

Protein-coding gene in the species Homo sapiens

Identifiers
- Aliases: PCGF5, RNF159, polycomb group ring finger 5
- External IDs: OMIM: 617407; MGI: 1923505; GeneCards: PCGF5
Available structures
PDB	Ortholog search: PDBe RCSB
PDB	List of PDB id codes 4S3O

Gene location (Human)
Chr.	Chromosome 10 (human)
Band	10q23.32	Start	91,163,012 bp
Band	10q23.32	End	91,284,337 bp

Gene location (Mouse)
Chr.	Chromosome 19 (mouse)
Band	19|19 C2	Start	36,325,709 bp
Band	19|19 C2	End	36,438,370 bp
RNA expression pattern
Bgee	Human / Mouse (ortholog); Top expressed in: cardiac muscle tissue of right atrium; myocardium of left ventricle; blood; pars compacta; skin of arm; superior vestibular nucleus; saphenous vein; pars reticulata; monocyte; oocyte / Top expressed in: spermatocyte; ascending aorta; aortic valve; otolith organ; utricle; seminiferous tubule; atrioventricular valve; knee joint; ciliary body; spermatid; More reference expression data
BioGPS	n/a
Gene ontology
Molecular function	protein binding; metal ion binding; RNA polymerase II transcription regulatory region sequence-specific DNA binding; DNA-binding transcription factor activity
Cellular component	centrosome; nucleolus; nucleus; nucleoplasm; X chromosome; PcG protein complex; PRC1 complex
Biological process	regulation of transcription, DNA-templated; transcription, DNA-templated; positive regulation of transcription by RNA polymerase II; histone H2A-K119 monoubiquitination; inactivation of X chromosome by genetic imprinting
Sources:Amigo / QuickGO
Orthologs
Databases	NCBI: entry; OMA: entry
Species	Human	Mouse
Entrez	84333	76073
Ensembl	ENSG00000180628	ENSMUSG00000024805
UniProt	Q86SE9	Q3UK78
RefSeq (mRNA)	NM_001256549; NM_001257101; NM_032373	NM_029508; NM_001368690; NM_001368691; NM_001368692; NM_001368693
RefSeq (protein)	NP_001243478; NP_001244030; NP_115749	NP_083784; NP_001355619; NP_001355620; NP_001355621; NP_001355622
Location (UCSC)	Chr 10: 91.16 – 91.28 Mb	Chr 19: 36.33 – 36.44 Mb
PubMed search
- Wikidata
View/Edit Human	View/Edit Mouse

Polycomb group RING finger protein 5 is a protein that in humans is encoded by the PCGF5 gene.
