= PCGF2 =

Protein-coding gene in the species Homo sapiens

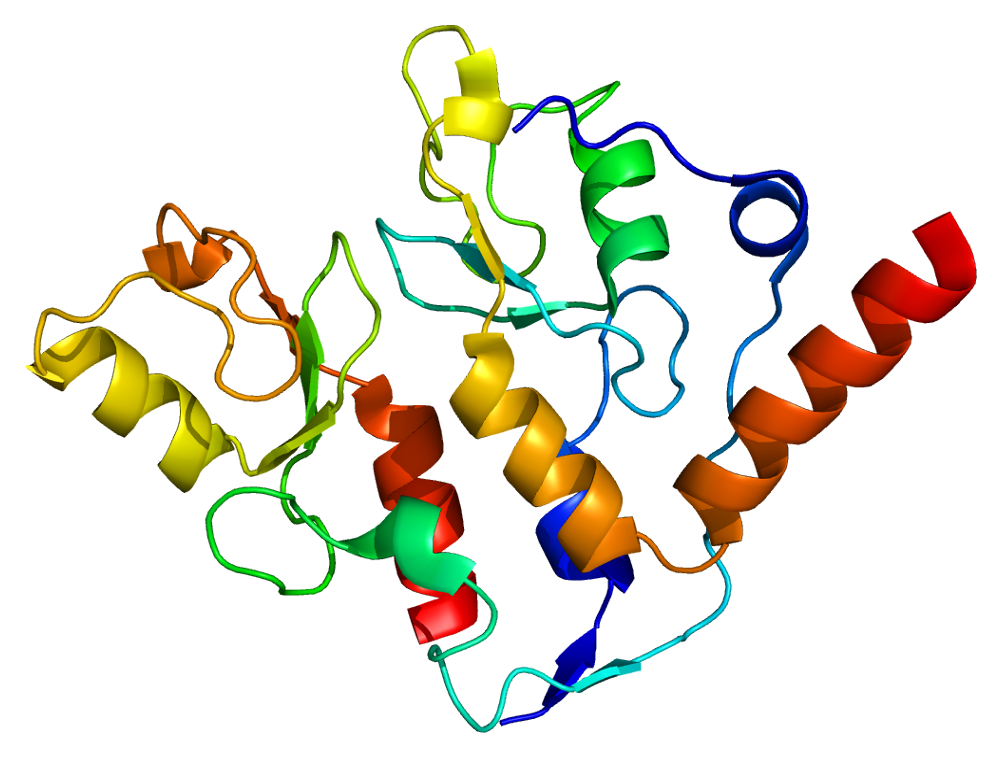

Identifiers
- Aliases: PCGF2, MEL-18, RNF110, ZNF144, polycomb group ring finger 2, TPFS
- External IDs: OMIM: 600346; MGI: 99161; GeneCards: PCGF2

Gene location (Human)
Chr.	Chromosome 17 (human)
Band	17q12	Start	38,733,898 bp
Band	17q12	End	38,749,817 bp

Gene location (Mouse)
Chr.	Chromosome 11 (mouse)
Band	11 D|11 61.06 cM	Start	97,579,649 bp
Band	11 D|11 61.06 cM	End	97,591,323 bp
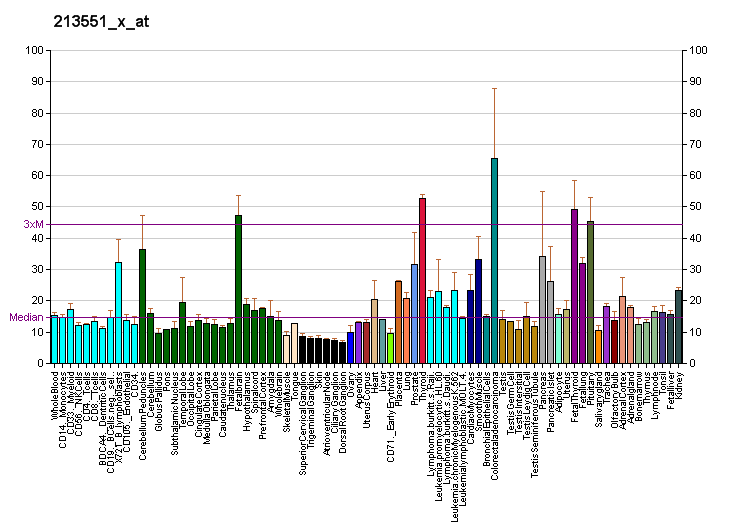

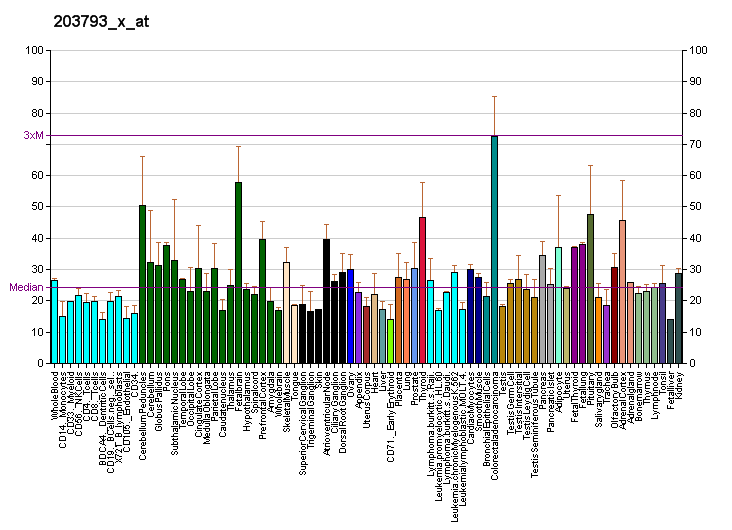

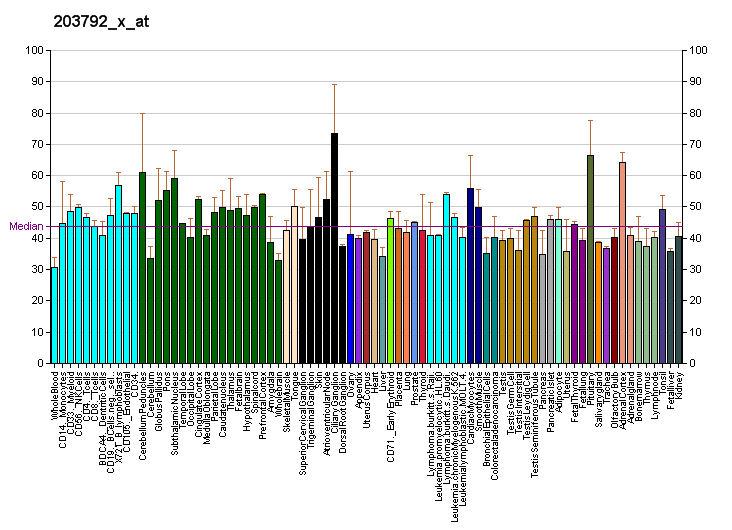
RNA expression pattern
Bgee	Human / Mouse (ortholog); Top expressed in: ganglionic eminence; stromal cell of endometrium; ventricular zone; pituitary gland; anterior pituitary; canal of the cervix; human kidney; body of uterus; left lobe of thyroid gland; right lobe of thyroid gland / Top expressed in: genital tubercle; tail of embryo; ventricular zone; gallbladder; superior surface of tongue; epiblast; neural layer of retina; yolk sac; plantaris muscle; superior frontal gyrus; More reference expression data
BioGPS	More reference expression data
Gene ontology
Molecular function	metal ion binding; chromatin binding; DNA-binding transcription factor activity; DNA binding; protein binding; promoter-specific chromatin binding
Cellular component	nucleoplasm; nucleus; sex chromatin; nuclear body; PcG protein complex; PRC1 complex
Biological process	anterior/posterior pattern specification; transcription, DNA-templated; negative regulation of apoptotic signaling pathway; embryonic skeletal system morphogenesis; cellular response to hydrogen peroxide; histone acetylation; in utero embryonic development; regulation of transcription, DNA-templated; embryonic skeletal system development; negative regulation of transcription by RNA polymerase II; histone H2A-K119 monoubiquitination; negative regulation of G0 to G1 transition
Sources:Amigo / QuickGO
Orthologs
Databases	NCBI: entry; OMA: entry
Species	Human	Mouse
Entrez	7703	22658
Ensembl	ENSG00000277258; ENSG00000278644	ENSMUSG00000018537
UniProt	P35227	P23798
RefSeq (mRNA)	NM_007144; NM_001369614; NM_001369615	NM_001163307; NM_001163308; NM_009545
RefSeq (protein)	NP_009075; NP_001356543; NP_001356544	NP_001156779; NP_001156780; NP_033571
Location (UCSC)	Chr 17: 38.73 – 38.75 Mb	Chr 11: 97.58 – 97.59 Mb
PubMed search
- Wikidata
View/Edit Human	View/Edit Mouse

Polycomb group RING finger protein 2, PCGF2, also known as MEL18 or RNF110, is a protein that in humans is encoded by the PCGF2 gene.

== Function ==
The protein encoded by this gene contains a RING finger motif. PCGF2 is a component of the canonical PRC1 complex composed of RING1A/B, CBX2/CBX4, polyhomeotic (PHC) proteins and is very similar to the PCGF4/BMI1 containing PRC1. Canonical PRC1 binds to chromatin via the chromodomain of the CBX subunit that recognizes the H3K27me3 mark deposited by PRC2. Canonical PRC1 complexes have been shown to compact chromatin and mediate higher-order chromatin structures.

Polycomb complexes maintain the transcription repression of genes involved in embryogenesis, cell cycles, and tumorigenesis. PCGF2 was shown to act as a negative regulator of transcription and has tumor suppressor activity. The expression of this gene was detected in various tumor cells, but is limited in neural organs in normal tissues. Knockout studies in mice suggested that this protein may negatively regulate the expression of different cytokines, chemokines, and chemokine receptors, and thus plays an important role in lymphocyte differentiation and migration, as well as in immune responses.
