= TRIM41 =

Protein-coding gene in the species Homo sapiens

Identifiers
- Aliases: TRIM41, RINCK, tripartite motif containing 41
- External IDs: OMIM: 610530; MGI: 2384814; GeneCards: TRIM41
Available structures
PDB	Ortholog search: PDBe RCSB
PDB	List of PDB id codes 2EGM
Enzyme activity
EC #	BRENDA	ExPASy	KEGG	MetaCyc
2.3.2.27	↗	↗	↗	↗

Gene location (Human)
Chr.	Chromosome 5 (human)
Band	5q35.3	Start	181,222,499 bp
Band	5q35.3	End	181,235,808 bp

Gene location (Mouse)
Chr.	Chromosome 11 (mouse)
Band	11|11 B1.2	Start	48,697,231 bp
Band	11|11 B1.2	End	48,708,180 bp
RNA expression pattern
Bgee	Human / Mouse (ortholog); Top expressed in: C1 segment; internal globus pallidus; inferior ganglion of vagus nerve; subthalamic nucleus; substantia nigra; amygdala; medulla oblongata; ventral tegmental area; skin of arm; superior vestibular nucleus / Top expressed in: neural layer of retina; Rostral migratory stream; Paneth cell; dentate gyrus of hippocampal formation granule cell; Gonadal ridge; condyle; granulocyte; lip; fossa; medullary collecting duct; More reference expression data
BioGPS	n/a
Gene ontology
Molecular function	zinc ion binding; protein binding; metal ion binding; identical protein binding; transferase activity
Cellular component	cytoplasm; nucleolus; intracellular anatomical structure; nucleus; nuclear body
Biological process	protein ubiquitination; cellular response to lipopolysaccharide; cellular response to muramyl dipeptide
Sources:Amigo / QuickGO
Orthologs
Databases	NCBI: entry; OMA: entry
Species	Human	Mouse
Entrez	90933	211007
Ensembl	ENSG00000146063	ENSMUSG00000040365
UniProt	Q8WV44	Q5NCC3
RefSeq (mRNA)	NM_033549; NM_201627	NM_145377
RefSeq (protein)	NP_291027; NP_963921	NP_663352
Location (UCSC)	Chr 5: 181.22 – 181.24 Mb	Chr 11: 48.7 – 48.71 Mb
PubMed search
- Wikidata
View/Edit Human	View/Edit Mouse

Tripartite motif-containing protein 41 is a protein that in humans is encoded by the TRIM41 gene.
