= RNF26 =

Protein-coding gene in humans

Identifiers
- Aliases: RNF26, ring finger protein 26
- External IDs: OMIM: 606130; MGI: 2388131; GeneCards: RNF26
Enzyme activity
| EC # | BRENDA | ExPASy | KEGG | MetaCyc |
|---|---|---|---|---|
| 2.3.2.27 | ↗ | ↗ | ↗ | ↗ |

Gene location (Human)
| Chr. | Chromosome 11 (human) |
| Band | 11q23.3 | Start | 119,334,527 bp |
| Band | 11q23.3 | End | 119,337,309 bp |

Gene location (Mouse)
| Chr. | Chromosome 9 (mouse) |
| Band | 9|9 A5.1 | Start | 44,006,928 bp |
| Band | 9|9 A5.1 | End | 44,024,814 bp |
RNA expression pattern
| Bgee | Human / Mouse (ortholog); Top expressed in: mucosa of ileum; ventricular zone; stromal cell of endometrium; mucosa of transverse colon; smooth muscle tissue; prefrontal cortex; right coronary artery; popliteal artery; tibial arteries; body of stomach / Top expressed in: tracheobronchial tree; trachea; choroid plexus; choroid plexus of fourth ventricle; embryonic cell; zygote; primary motor cortex; medulla oblongata; pons; secondary oocyte; More reference expression data |
| BioGPS | n/a |
Gene ontology
| Molecular function | metal ion binding; protein binding; zinc ion binding; ubiquitin protein ligase activity; transferase activity |
| Cellular component | integral component of membrane; membrane; endoplasmic reticulum; endoplasmic reticulum membrane |
| Biological process | endosome organization; regulation of type I interferon production; negative regulation of defense response to virus; protein K11-linked ubiquitination; protein localization to perinuclear region of cytoplasm; protein ubiquitination |
Sources:Amigo / QuickGO
Orthologs
| Databases | NCBI: entry; OMA: entry |
| Species | Human | Mouse |
| Entrez | 79102 | 213211 |
| Ensembl | ENSG00000173456 | ENSMUSG00000053128 |
| UniProt | Q9BY78 | Q8BUH7 |
| RefSeq (mRNA) | NM_032015 | NM_153762 |
| RefSeq (protein) | NP_114404 | NP_717095 |
| Location (UCSC) | Chr 11: 119.33 – 119.34 Mb | Chr 9: 44.01 – 44.02 Mb |
| PubMed search |
- Wikidata
| View/Edit Human | View/Edit Mouse |

Ring finger protein 26 is a protein that in humans is encoded by the RNF26 gene.

== Function ==
The protein encoded by this intronless gene contains a C3HC5 type of RING finger, a motif known to be involved in protein-DNA and protein-protein interactions. The expression of this gene was found to be upregulated in cancer cell lines derived from different types of cancer. [provided by RefSeq, Jul 2008].
