= RFPL4B =

Protein-coding gene in the species Homo sapiens

Identifiers
- Aliases: RFPL4B, RNF211, ret finger protein like 4B
- External IDs: MGI: 2684908; GeneCards: RFPL4B

Gene location (Human)
Chr.	Chromosome 6 (human)
Band	6q21	Start	112,347,330 bp
Band	6q21	End	112,351,294 bp

Gene location (Mouse)
Chr.	Chromosome 10 (mouse)
Band	10|10 B1	Start	38,696,537 bp
Band	10|10 B1	End	38,697,775 bp
RNA expression pattern
Bgee	Human / Mouse (ortholog); Top expressed in: testicle; gonad; placenta; right testis; left testis; ganglionic eminence; smooth muscle tissue; renal cortex; gallbladder; human kidney / Top expressed in: zygote; More reference expression data
BioGPS	n/a
Orthologs
Databases	NCBI: entry; OMA: entry
Species	Human	Mouse
Entrez	442247	215919
Ensembl	ENSG00000251258	ENSMUSG00000094311
UniProt	Q6ZWI9	J3QPR6
RefSeq (mRNA)	NM_001013734	NM_001177783
RefSeq (protein)	NP_001013756	NP_001171254
Location (UCSC)	Chr 6: 112.35 – 112.35 Mb	Chr 10: 38.7 – 38.7 Mb
PubMed search
- Wikidata
View/Edit Human	View/Edit Mouse

Ret finger protein like 4B is a protein that in humans is encoded by the RFPL4B gene.
