= DTX1 =

Protein-coding gene in humans

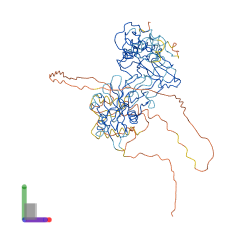

Identifiers
- Aliases: DTX1, hDx-1, deltex 1, deltex E3 ubiquitin ligase 1, RNF140
- External IDs: OMIM: 602582; MGI: 1352744; GeneCards: DTX1
Enzyme activity
EC #	BRENDA	ExPASy	KEGG	MetaCyc
2.3.2.27	↗	↗	↗	↗

Gene location (Human)
Chr.	Chromosome 12 (human)
Band	12q24.13	Start	113,056,730 bp
Band	12q24.13	End	113,098,028 bp

Gene location (Mouse)
Chr.	Chromosome 5 (mouse)
Band	5 F|5 60.64 cM	Start	120,818,267 bp
Band	5 F|5 60.64 cM	End	120,849,992 bp
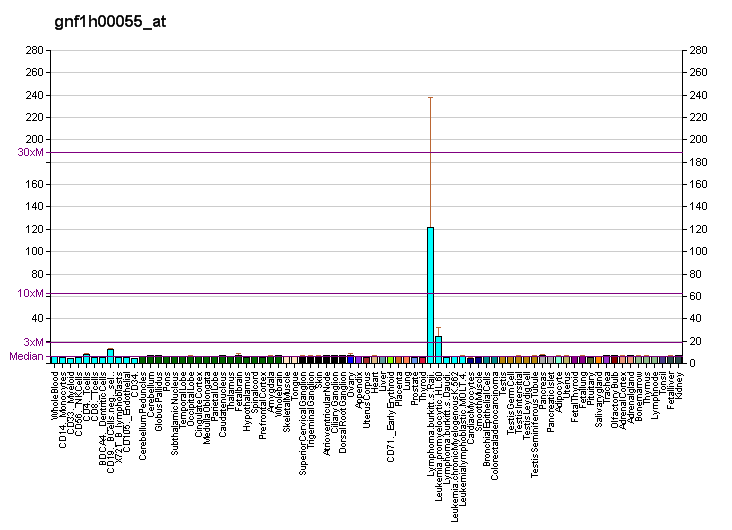
RNA expression pattern
Bgee	Human / Mouse (ortholog); Top expressed in: spleen; right frontal lobe; cingulate gyrus; anterior cingulate cortex; right hemisphere of cerebellum; nucleus accumbens; Brodmann area 9; amygdala; ganglionic eminence; prefrontal cortex / Top expressed in: entorhinal cortex; mesenteric lymph nodes; perirhinal cortex; dentate gyrus of hippocampal formation granule cell; primary visual cortex; motor neuron; superior colliculus; cerebellar cortex; lumbar subsegment of spinal cord; Rostral migratory stream; More reference expression data
BioGPS	More reference expression data
Gene ontology
Molecular function	SH3 domain binding; transcription coactivator activity; zinc ion binding; protein binding; ubiquitin protein ligase binding; metal ion binding; Notch binding; transferase activity
Cellular component	cytoplasm; nucleus; nucleoplasm; cytosol; nuclear body
Biological process	Notch signaling pathway; cell surface receptor signaling pathway; glial cell differentiation; transcription by RNA polymerase II; regulation of Notch signaling pathway; negative regulation of T cell differentiation; negative regulation of neuron differentiation; protein ubiquitination; transcription, DNA-templated; cellular response to leukemia inhibitory factor; positive regulation of nucleic acid-templated transcription
Sources:Amigo / QuickGO
Orthologs
Databases	NCBI: entry; OMA: entry
Species	Human	Mouse
Entrez	1840	14357
Ensembl	ENSG00000135144	ENSMUSG00000029603
UniProt	Q86Y01	Q61010
RefSeq (mRNA)	NM_004416	NM_008052
RefSeq (protein)	NP_004407	NP_032078
Location (UCSC)	Chr 12: 113.06 – 113.1 Mb	Chr 5: 120.82 – 120.85 Mb
PubMed search
- Wikidata
View/Edit Human	View/Edit Mouse

Protein deltex-1 is a protein that in humans is encoded by the DTX1 gene.

== Function ==
Studies in Drosophila have identified this gene as encoding a positive regulator of the notch signaling pathway. The human gene encodes a protein of unknown function; however, it may play a role in basic helix-loop-helix transcription factor activity.

== Interactions ==
DTX1 has been shown to interact with EP300.
