= Tripartite motif family =

The tripartite motif family (TRIM) is a protein family.

== Function ==
Many TRIM proteins are induced by interferons, which are important component of resistance to pathogens and several TRIM proteins are known to be required for the restriction of infection by lentiviruses. TRIM proteins are involved in pathogen-recognition and by regulation of transcriptional pathways in host defence.

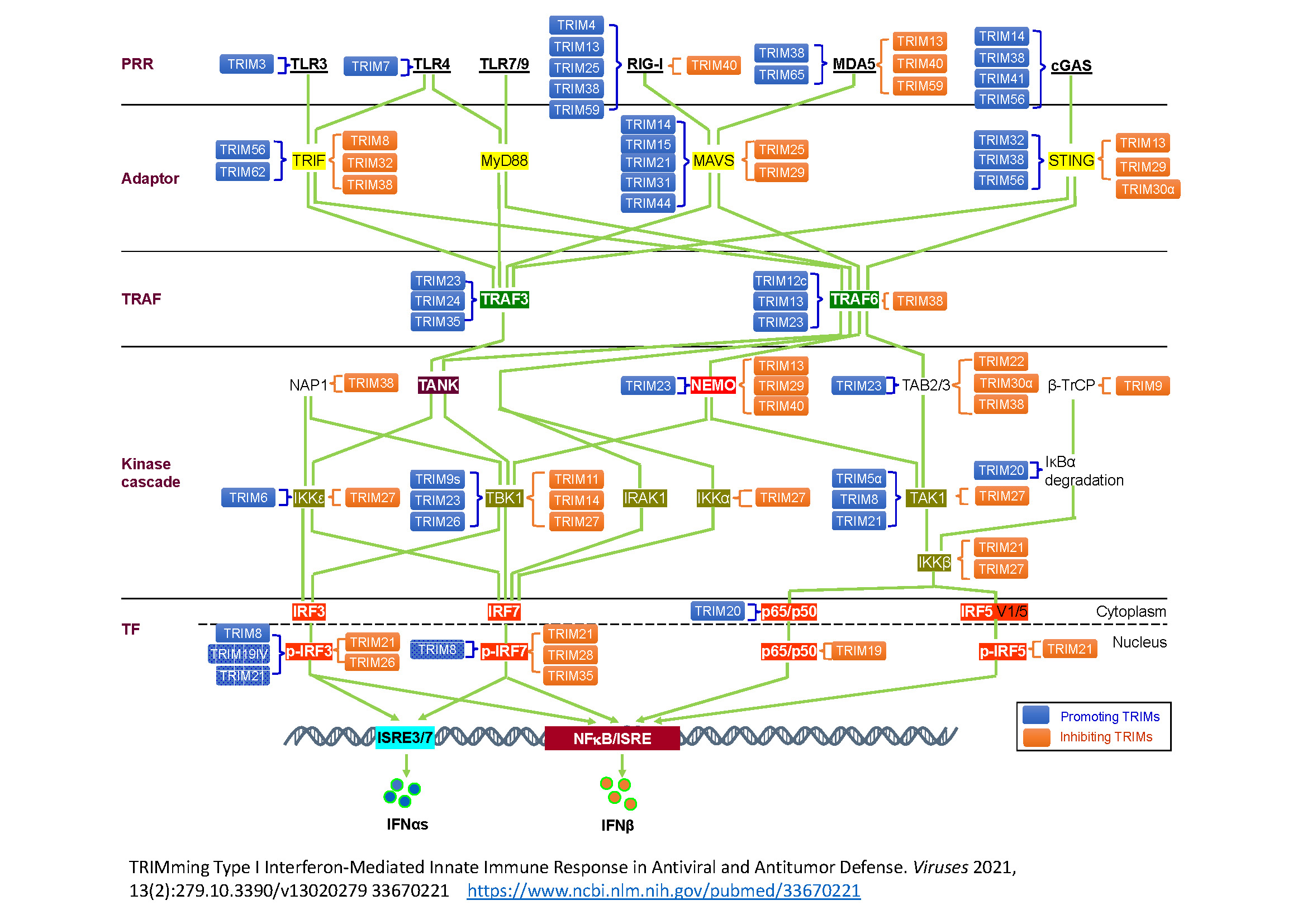

== Structure ==
The tripartite motif is always present at the N-terminus of the TRIM proteins. The TRIM motif includes the following three domains:

- (1) a RING finger domain
- (2) one or two B-box zinc finger domains
  - when only one B-box is present, it is always a type-2 B-box
  - when two B-boxes are present the type-1 B-Box always precedes the type-2 B-Box
- (3) coiled coil region

The C-terminus of TRIM proteins contain either:

- Group 1 proteins: a C-terminal domain selected from the following list:
  - NHL and IGFLMN domains, either in association or alone
  - PHD domain associated with a bromodomain
  - MATH domain (in e.g., TRIM37)
  - ARF domain (in e.g., TRIM23)
  - EXOIII domain (in e.g., TRIM19) or
- Group 2 proteins: a SPRY C-terminal domain
  - e.g. TRIM21

== Family members ==
The TRIM family is split into two groups that differ in domain structure and genomic organization:

- Group 1 members possess a variety of C-terminal domains, and are represented in both vertebrate and invertebrates
- Group 2 is absent in invertebrates, possess a C-terminal SPRY domain

Members of the family include:

- Group 1
  - PHD-BROMO domain containing: TRIM24 (TIF1α), TRIM28 (TIF1β), TRIM33 (TIF1γ)– act as corepressors
  - 1-10: TRIM1, TRIM2, TRIM3, TRIM8, TRIM9
  - 11-20: TRIM12, TRIM13, TRIM14, TRIM16, TRIM18, TRIM19
  - 21-30: TRIM23, TRIM25, TRIM29, TRIM30
  - 31-40: TRIM32, TRIM36, TRIM37
  - 41-50: TRIM42, TRIM44, TRIM45, TRIM46, TRIM47
  - 51-60: TRIM51, TRIM53, TRIM54, TRIM55, TRIM56, TRIM57, TRIM59
  - 61-70: TRIM62, TRIM63, TRIM65, TRIM66, TRIM67, TRIM69, TRIM70
  - 71-75: TRIM71
- Group 2
  - 1-10: TRIM4, TRIM5, TRIM6, TRIM7, TRIM10
  - 11-20: TRIM11, TRIM12, TRIM15, TRIM17, TRIM20
  - 21-30: TRIM21, TRIM22, TRIM26, TRIM27, TRIM30
  - 31-40: TRIM31, TRIM34, TRIM35, TRIM38, TRIM39, TRIM40
  - 41-50: TRIM41, TRIM43, TRIM48, TRIM49, TRIM50
  - 51-60: TRIM51, TRIM52, TRIM53, TRIM57, TRIM58, TRIM60
  - 61-70: TRIM61, TRIM64, TRIM68, TRIM69, TRIM70
  - 71-75: TRIM72, TRIM73, TRIM74, TRIM75
