= ZNF337 =

Protein-coding gene in the species Homo sapiens

Identifiers
- Aliases: ZNF337, zinc finger protein 337
- External IDs: GeneCards: ZNF337

Gene location (Human)
Chr.	Chromosome 20 (human)
Band	20p11.21	Start	25,673,195 bp
Band	20p11.21	End	25,696,853 bp
RNA expression pattern
Bgee	Human / Mouse (ortholog); Top expressed in: cerebellar hemisphere; right hemisphere of cerebellum; tendon of biceps brachii; right uterine tube; ganglionic eminence; cerebellar vermis; left ovary; right ovary; muscle layer of sigmoid colon; granulocyte / n/a; More reference expression data
BioGPS	n/a
Gene ontology
Molecular function	DNA binding; protein binding; metal ion binding; nucleic acid binding; DNA-binding transcription factor activity, RNA polymerase II-specific
Cellular component	intracellular anatomical structure; nucleus
Biological process	regulation of transcription, DNA-templated; transcription, DNA-templated; regulation of transcription by RNA polymerase II
Sources:Amigo / QuickGO
Orthologs
Databases	NCBI: entry; OMA: entry
Species	Human	Mouse
Entrez	26152	n/a
Ensembl	ENSG00000130684	n/a
UniProt	Q9Y3M9	n/a
RefSeq (mRNA)	NM_001290261; NM_015655	n/a
RefSeq (protein)	NP_001277190; NP_056470	n/a
Location (UCSC)	Chr 20: 25.67 – 25.7 Mb	n/a
PubMed search		n/a
- Wikidata
View/Edit Human

ZNF337, also known as zinc finger protein 337, is a protein that in humans is encoded by the ZNF337 gene. The ZNF337 gene is located on human chromosome 20 (20p11.21). Its protein contains 751 amino acids, has a 4,237 base pair mRNA and contains 6 exons total. In addition, alternative splicing results in multiple transcript variants. The ZNF337 gene encodes a zinc finger domain containing protein, however, this gene/protein is not yet well understood by the scientific community. The function of this gene has been proposed to participate in a processes such as the regulation of transcription (DNA-dependent), and proteins are expected to have molecular functions such as DNA binding, metal ion binding, zinc ion binding, which would be further localized in various subcellular locations. While there are no commonly associated or known aliases, an important paralog of this gene is ZNF875.

== Gene ==
There are no commonly associated or known aliases beyond Zinc Finger 337, however, some potential ones could include LOC26152. Its locus is found on chromosome 20, positioned 11.21 (20p11.21). Base coordinates are on the negative (minus) strand. There are 6 exons in total. The span of the ZNF337 gene (the start of transcription to the polyA site in base-pairs) is 4,237 base pairs (mRNA).

== Transcripts ==
The ZNF337 gene contains two transcript variants (both encode the same protein); variant 1 represents the longer transcript (751 aa) while variant 2 differs in the 5’ UTR. There are also three isoforms (X1, X2, and X3). These isoforms represent one of many splice variants of the gene (while the transcript is an expressed sequence).

== Proteins ==
ZNF337 has a predicted molecular weight of about 86.9 kdal and a predicted isoelectric point of 9.74 pI. These are predictions, as post translational modifications could affect these values. As suggested by the protein's name, there are several zinc fingers. There are no high scoring hydrophobic or transmembrane segments/regions and has no positive or negative charge clusters.

Some amino acids found in ZNF337 are seen in unusual amounts as shown below. In amino acid distribution, glutamine (E), methionine (M), and alanine (A) are low while cysteine (C ) and histidine (H) are high. It is rare for cysteine particularly to be highly expressed in amino acid sequences; the ZNF337 protein is an unusually basic protein. Because of its basic properties, it is DNA or RNA loving (i.e. able to bind to DNA or RNA fairly easily).

=== Domains and Motifs ===
As found through the MyHits program (found on ExPasy), there are about 6 different motifs (or pfams) present in ZNF337.

Motif Type	Amino Acid Sequence Position	e-value
KRAB (KRAB box)	12-52	6.6e-26
PHD (PHD-finger)	349-412	0.0032
Rpr2 (RNAse P Rpr2/Rpr21/SNM1 domain)	472-551	0.00088
Zf-Cys_{2}His_{2} (Zinc finger, Cys_{2}His_{2} type)	208-230	4.3e-06
	236-258	3.8e-09
	264-286	6e-07
	292-314	2.4e-08
	320-342	4.6e-07
	348-370	1.9e-09
	376-398	2.8e-07
	404-426	5.9e-09
	432-454	1.2e-07
	460-482	1.8e-08
	488-510	3.1e-07
	516-538	3.8-07
	544-566	2.1e-06
	572-594	2.2e-06
	600-622	5e-07
	628-650	1.3e-08
	656-679	0.00014
	685-707	2.4e-07
	713-735	1.2e-07
Zf-C3HC4 (Zinc finger, C3HC4 type (RING finger))	210-269	0.00083
Zf-FCS (MYM-type zinc finger with FCS sequence motif)	342-385	0.02

Table 1. Six different motifs within the ZNF337 protein. The KRAB box, PHD finger, Rpr2, Zinc finger (Cys_{2}His_{2} type), Zinc finger (C3HC4 type - RING finger), and Zinc finger (MYM-type zinc finger with FCS sequence motif) all play different functions and roles.

=== Secondary & Tertiary Structures ===
The secondary structure of ZNF337 is predicted to have many helices, sheets, turns and coils (especially random coils) as shown below.

Secondary Structure Composition
Type of Secondary Structure	Number of Amino Acids	Percent Composition
Alpha Helix	169	22.50%
Extended Strand	154	20.51%
Random Coil	428	56.99%

Both the H. Sapiens and P. troglodyte secondary structures are extremely similar; however, it is interesting to compare to S. dumerili where there is a stronger presence of sheets and coils between both 200-300 bp and 400-500 bp positions instead of sheets and helices. Additionally, comparing the beginning of the secondary structure (0-14 bp) of all species/orthologs shows that coils and turns make up the majority of the beginning, but not as much in some species such as S. dumerili (more helices and sheets instead).

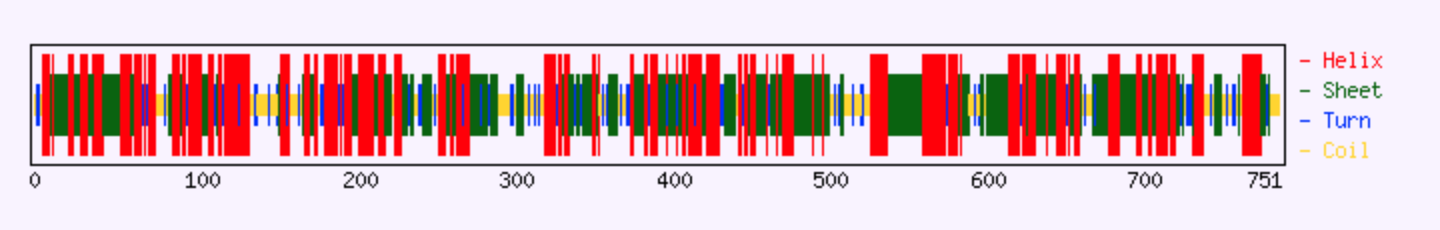
P. troglodytes (95.6% identical to human protein) secondary structure

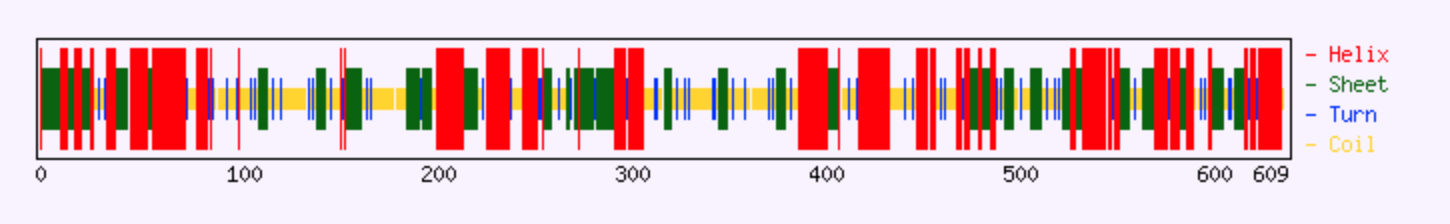
S. dumerili (30.9% identical to human protein) secondary structure

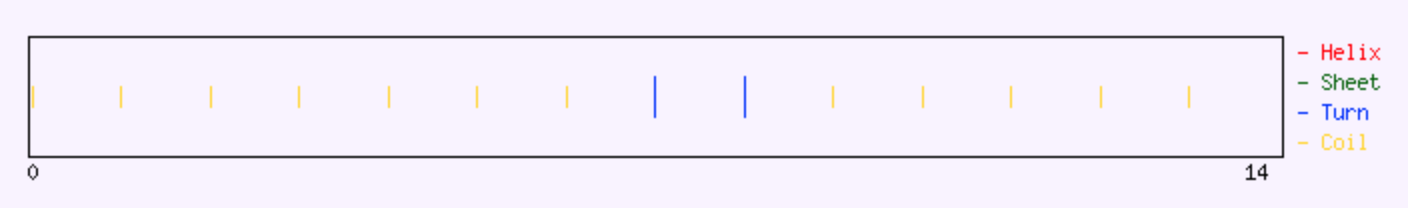
C. japonica (1.9% identical to human protein) secondary structure

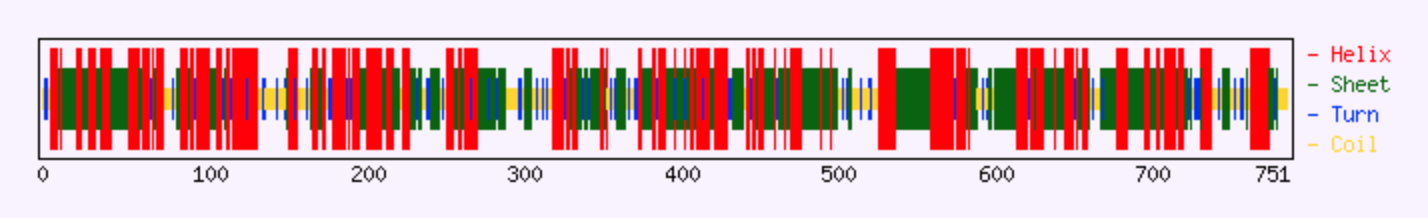
H. Sapiens ZNF337 secondary structure

Several tertiary structure modeling programs were unable to construct a model for ZNF337. When using the SWISS-model program, some models were constructed, however, to ZNF568. The ZNF568 protein sequence is 45.20% identical to that of ZNF337, has a sequence similarity of 0.44, and coverage of 0.37 with a range between the 345-623 bp amino acids in the ZNF337 protein sequence. The predicted tertiary structure is shown in Figure 1. In this figure, there are several zinc ion ligands.

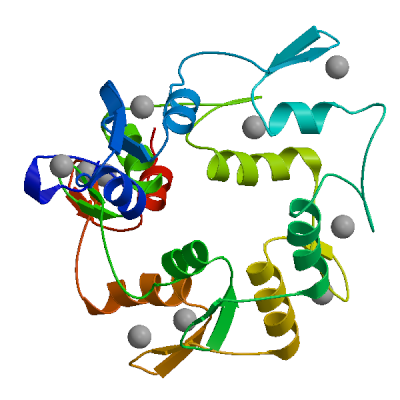
Figure 1. Predicted tertiary structure of ZNF568, which is 45.20% identical to the ZNF337 protein sequence. Created using SWISS-MODEL.

ZNF568 is a protein coding gene, associated with diseases such as transient neonatal diabetes mellitus. It has transcriptional repression activity, partially through the recruitment of the co-repressor TRIM28, but also has repression activity independently of this interaction. It is specifically important during embryonic development, where it acts as a direct repressor of a placental-specific transcript of IGF2 in early development and regulates convergent extension movements required for axis elongation and tissue morphogenesis in all germ layers. It is also crucial for normal morphogenesis of extraembryonic tissues including the yolk sac, extraembryonic mesoderm and placenta. Interestingly, it may enhance proliferation or maintenance of neural stem cells

== Gene Level Regulation ==
=== Promoter ===
The promoter region was chosen using ElDorado at Genomatrix, which assessed the ZNF337 gene locus for possible promoter regions. Out of the six possible promoter regions and sets, promoter set 6 (GXP_8991829) was chosen as it is the one best supported by transcripts (has six transcript ID's). Its start position is 25696627, its end position is 25697904 and its length is 1278 base pairs. Within GXP_8991829 (-), coding transcript GXT_26235925 was chosen as it has 5 exons, 37,403 CAGE tags, and corresponds with accession number XM_006723558 in NCBI (see Figure 2).

The promoter sequence contains a CpG island with a CpG count of 138. There is also a DNAse cluster (score =1000) present within the promoter sequence.

=== Transcription Factor Binding Sites ===
Possible transcription factors for the ZNF337 promoter region were determined using ElDorado at Genomatrix. These are listed below in Table 2.

Transcription factor	Detailed matrix information	Anchor base/Position	Matrix similarity	Sequence
TF2B	Transcription factor II B (TFIIB) recognition element	984	1.0	ccgCGCC
VTBP	Avian C-type LTR TATA box	21	0.814	ctatagtTAAGaacaat
	Avian C-type LTR TATA box	743	0.825	ttttattTAGGtagccc
	Lentivirus LTR TATA box	314	0.83	gtgTATAatatgctgat
	Cellular and viral TATA box elements	177	0.961	ccctaTAAAtatgtaca
	Cellular and viral TATA box elements	275	0.911	aaataTAAAgtctacgt
CAAT	Cellular and viral CCAAT box	553	0.909	taaaCCATtgagaga
CAAT	Nuclear factor Y (Y-box binding factor)	114	0.939	taccCCAAtcaccct
CEBP	CCAAT/enhancer binding protein (C/EBP), epsilon	289	0.974	gtggtttgGCAAgcc

Table 2. Possible transcription factors for ZNF337 promoter region.

There are 340 factors from 129 cell types of Transcription Factor ChIP-seq Clusters (from Encode3). With that said, only the strong ones (indicated as black or dark grey) that also contain peaks within the promoter or enhancer regions are shown in Table 3.

Location	Transcription factor – ChIP	Cell Type(s)
Promoter	CTCF	GM12878 (human lymphoblastoid), H1-hESC (human embryonic stem cells), K562 (myelogenous leukemia cells)
Promoter	RFX5	GM12878 (human lymphoblastoid)
Promoter	STAT1	GM12878 (human lymphoblastoid)
Promoter	TAF1	GM12878 (human lymphoblastoid)
Promoter	TRIM22	GM12878 (human lymphoblastoid)
Promoter	REST	H1-hESC (human embryonic stem cells)
Promoter	GABPA	HeLa-S3 (cervical cancer cell line)
Promoter	MAFK	HeLa-S3 (cervical cancer cell line)
Promoter	TBP	HeLa-S3 (cervical cancer cell line)
Promoter	FOXA1	HepG2 (human liver cancer cell line)
Promoter	SIN3A	HepG2 (human liver cancer cell line)
Promoter	SP1	HepG2 (human liver cancer cell line)
Promoter	GATA2	K562 (myelogenous leukemia cells)
Promoter	MYC	K562 (myelogenous leukemia cells)
Promoter	POLR2A	Body of Pancreas
Promoter	FOS	Endothelial Cell of Umbilical Vein

Table 3. Transcription Factor-ChIP Clusters associated with specific cell types.

According to ORegAnno (literature curated TFBSs), there is no TF-ChIP signal overlap within the promoter/enhancer regions. Most of the ORegAnno citations correlate with a “NANP” gene, while transcription factors CTCF and CEBPA are confirmed in the enhancer region for the ZNF337 gene.

=== Expression Patterns ===
Both RNA sequence data from the Gene database records at NCBI and the Human Protein Atlas using immunohistochemical staining to determine protein in various tissues show that the ZNF337 protein is expressed in many tissues. While ZNF337 mRNA tissue specificity is expressed in low tissue specificity levels, the mRNA is notably expressed in the cerebellum (brain) but is also more highly expressed in all tissues (distribution in all) compared to protein expression, especially higher in female tissues.

An antibody was developed against a recombinant protein corresponding to amino acids: ESSQGQRENPTEIDKVLKGIENSRWGAFKCAERGQDFSRKMMVIIHKKAHSRQKLFTCRECHQGFRDESALLLHQN. The specificity of human ZNF337 antibody was verified on a Protein Array containing target protein plus 383 other non-specific proteins. This isotype is IgG, its clonality is polyclonal, its host is rabbit, and its purity is immunogen affinity purified. This staining of human cerebellum shows cytoplasmic positivity in Purkinje cells (which regulate and coordinate motor movements through inhibitory functions and neurotransmitters).

While there is little-some expressivity in a wide range of tissues, together, these results indicate a trend that expressivity is highest and most present in the brain, particularly the cerebellum. A few experiments and results also indicate expressivity in female (and some male) reproductive tissues.

== Transcript Level Regulation ==
Multiple sequence alignments were created to observe conservation between different species. Specifically, a multiple sequence alignment (MSA) of the ZNF337 promoter region in primates and marsupial (opossum, chimpanzee, human, and rhesus monkey), or closely related species, shows little to no conservation in the beginning of sequences.

There are highly conserved regions in the beginning of both the 5’ UTR and 3’ UTR multiple sequence alignments. These could be functionally important based on stem-loop formations, miRNA binding capacity, or RNA binding protein binding capacity.

== Protein Level Regulation ==
=== Localization ===
The prediction for localization of ZNF337 is highest in the nucleus (nuclear) at 95.7% followed by 4.3% in the mitochondria (mitochondrial).

=== Post-Translational Modifications ===
ZNF337 contains many predicted post-translational domains such as phosphorylation (serine and tyrosine kinases), PEST motifs, O-GlcNAc sites, SUMOylation, and glycation as seen below:

Modification	Amino Acid Number (in sequence)
Phosphorylation	46, 109, 127, 155, 287, 446, 474, 483, 672, 695, 708, 743, 745, 751
PEST motif	598-612
O-GlcNAc sites	109, 142, 231, 384, 750, 751
SUMOylation	633
Glycation	94, 123, 125, 199, 206, 234, 248, 309, 339, 374, 388, 407, 430, 449, 486, 547, 556, 617, 668, 730

Table 4. Different post-translation modifications. Modifications can alter protein structure, thus affecting overall protein function and viability.

- PEST motifs are high in proline (P), glutamic acid (E), serine (S), and threonine (T). PEST motifs are linked to a reduced half-life of proteins and are potential targets for proteolytic degradation/cleavage sites.
- O-GlcNAc modifications may compete with phosphorylation for control of a protein's activation state.
- SUMOylation can interfere with the interaction between the target and its partner, can provide a binding site for an interacting partner, result in a conformational change of the modified target, or facilitate or antagonize ubiquitination.
- Glycation sites indicate the potential for a nonenzymatic process to occur, in which proteins react with reducing sugar molecules and therefore impair the function and change the characteristics of the protein. Because there are quite a few of these glycation sites, there could be a somewhat high probability that it is easy to change the function or characteristic of the protein.

==== Predicted transmembrane domains, new signal peptides, N-terminal signal peptides, and cytoplasmic predictions ====
No predicted transmembrane domains were identified from tests run through SOSUI. A prediction for a new signal peptide is very low and negative at -3.83. The GvH is also very negative at -8.69 (with a possible cleavage site between amino acids 56 and 57), indicating a low possibility that it has a cleavable signal sequence. Thus, ZNF337 is predicted to have no N-terminal signal peptide. Also, Reinhardt's method for cytoplasmic/nuclear discrimination has a cytoplasmic prediction for ZNF337 with a reliability score of 94.1.

The nuclear localization signal is somewhat low at 0.75. Orthologs (P. troglodytes, S. dumerili, and C. asiatica ) were used to confirm the significance of these predictions. Likewise, there were no predictions of no N-terminal peptide signals and transmembrane domains. All these ZNF337 orthologous proteins confirmed the prediction of nuclear location at 95.7%.

== Homology/Evolution ==
An important paralog of the ZNF337 gene is ZNF875.

ZNF337 has many orthologs shown in a wide variety of species (vertebrates and invertebrates), such as primates, bony fishes, rodents, and even some plants as seen in Table 6 below. There are no orthologs found outside plants. Highly conserved amino acids and regions are shown in the middle-end of the ZNF337 protein sequence, suggesting that functions may differ due to less conservation in the beginning of ZNF337 sequences between species.

Phylogenetic trees highlight the evolution of species (specifically in relation to the evolution of the ZNF337 gene). Primates are clumped together closest to humans, while other species such as the megabat and mouse deviate from the cape golden mole or the zig zag eel and flier cichlid deviate from the greater amberjack. Species whose date of divergence from the human lineage (measured in units of millions of years ago) are greater show less sequence similarity and identity, which is also demonstrated through distance shown through phylogenetic trees.

Genus and species	Common name	Taxonomic group	Date of Divergence from Human Lineage (Million Years Ago - MYA)	Accession number	Sequence length (aa)	Sequence identity to human protein (%)	e-value
Homo sapiens	Human	Primates	0	NP_056470	751 aa	100%	0
Gorilla gorilla gorilla	Western gorilla	Primates	8.6	XP_004061979.1	751 aa	99.5%	0
Pongo pygmaeus	Bornean orangutan	Primates	15.2	XP_009231663.1	753 aa	98.3%	0
Colobus angolensis palliates	Angola colobus	Primates	15.2	XP_011807556.1	758 aa	96.7%	0
Aotus nancymaae	Nancy Ma's night monkey	Primates	42.9	XP_012324051.1	751 aa	94.4%	0
Pan troglodytes	Chimpanzee	Primates	6.4	XP_009435254.1	751 aa	95.6%	0
Macaca mulatta	Rhesus macaque	Primates	28.81	XP_028683917.1	751 aa	81.4%	0
Macaca fascicularis	Crab-eating macaque	Primates	28.81	XP_015313198.1	751 aa	81.2%	0
Cebus capucinus imitator	Panamanian white-faced capuchin	Primates	42.9	XP_017376089.1	751 aa	80.4%	0
Pan paniscus	Bonobo	Primates	6.4	XP_014198483.1	827 aa	76.8%	0
Tupaia chinensis	Chinese tree shrew	Scandentia	85	XP_006163813.1	876 aa	50.7%	0
Carlito syrichta	Philippine tarsier	Primates	69	XP_021573536.1	807 aa	52.5%	0
Chrysochloris asiatica	Cape golden mole	Afrosoricida	102	XP_006877795.1	764 aa	45.0%	0
Echinops telfairi	Lesser hedgehog tenrec	Afrosoricida	102	XP_030742187.1	1487 aa	26.1%	0
Seriola dumerili	Greater amberjack	Carangidae ("Bony fishes")	433	XP_022604330.1	763 aa	30.9%	0
Oreochromis niloticus	Nile tilapia	Cichildae ("Bony fishes")	433	XP_019222635.1	1033 aa	10.2%	0
Archocentrus centrachus	Flier cichlid	Cichildae ("Bony fishes")	433	XP_030603298.1	794 aa	28.6%	0
Mastacembelus armatus	Zig-zag eel	Synbrachiformes	433	XP_026164592.1	760 aa	28.7%	0
Pteropodidae	Megabat	Chiroptera	94		751 aa	35.4%	0
Mus musculus	Mouse	Rodentia	89		751 aa	26.5%	3.00e-153
Ciona intestinalis	Sea squirt	Enterogona	603		1278 aa	15.6%	3.00e-96
Petromyzontiformes	Sea lamprey	Lamprey	599		751 aa	7.1%	4.00e-35
Drosophila sechellia	Fruit fly	Fly	736		751 aa	6.9%	4.00e-35
Pristionchus pacificus	Roundworm	Rhabditida	736		751 aa	2.9%	6.00e-15
Caenorhabditis briggsae	Nematode	Rhabditida	736		751 aa	1.9%	2.00e-08
Camellia japonica	Japanese camellia	Plants	1275		751 aa	1.9%	2.00e-08

Table 5. Orthologs to ZNF337.

ZNF337 is evolving at the molecular level very quickly. When compared to fibrinogen protein rate of evolution, the ZNF337 appears to be accumulating the same amount amino acid changes in the same amount of time. It is evolving faster than cytochrome C protein, which is known to evolve slowly, as well as hemoglobin.

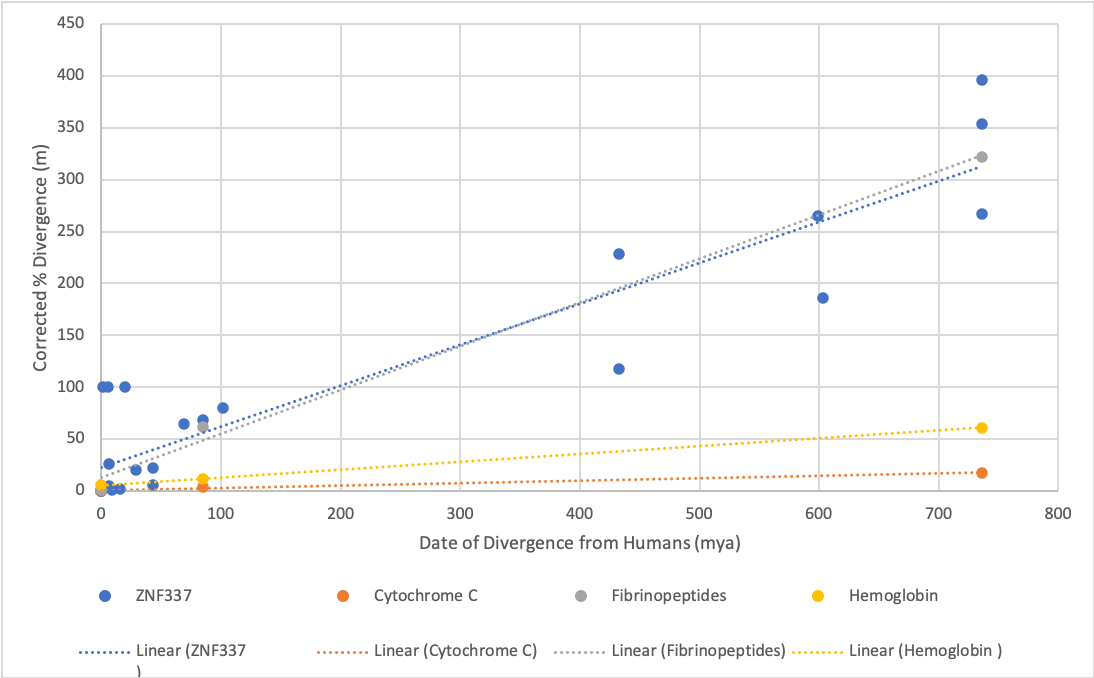
Divergence rate of ZNF337 compared to known fast diverging gene, fibrinogen, and slowly diverging gene, CytC. This graph shows the percent change in amino acid sequence over the date of divergence of the sequence from humans.

== Function/Biochemistry ==
The ZNF337 gene encodes a zinc finger domain containing protein, however, this gene/protein is not yet well understood by the scientific community.

The function of this gene has been proposed to participate in a processes such as the regulation of transcription (DNA-dependent), and proteins are expected to have molecular functions such as DNA binding, metal ion binding, zinc ion binding, which would be further localized in various subcellular locations.

Because ZNF337 has several post-translational modification sites, alternative protein states may be present that permit ZNF337 to have different forms.

ZNF337 also has a variety of interactions with other proteins as discussed above, suggesting it may have a broad range of action. The different transcription factors demonstrate roles in transcription regulation. The KRAB box in the beginning of the sequence may play an important role in cell differentiation and development as well as regulating viral replication and transcription. PHD fingers are found in nuclear proteins involved in epigenetics and chromatin-mediated transcriptional regulation. Zinc finger Cys_{2}His_{2} transcription factors are sequence-specific DNA binding proteins that regulate transcription. They possess DNA-binding domains that are formed from repeated Cys_{2}His_{2} zinc finger motifs. Also, many proteins containing a RING finger play a key role in the ubiquitination pathway.

== Interacting proteins ==
Only the CEBPA transcription factor within the strongest DNAse HS cluster was also detected by GenoMatix. GenoMatix determined that potential transcription factors could include the following: TF2B, VTBP, CAAT, and CEBP. This is confirmed to be associated with the ZNF337 gene by the TF-ChIP ENCODE data and ORegAnno. The cluster score for this overlapping transcription factor, CEBPA, is 1000. Transcription Factors that might bind to regulatory sequences, specifically the enhancer region, includes CEBPA (chr20:25670005-25670302) and CTCF (chr20:25670168-25670507).

== Clinical significance ==
Diseases associated with the ZNF337 gene include the development of adult astrocytic tumors, which is the most common glial (brain cell) tumor occurring within the brain and spinal cord. This observation and association could make sense as there is a high expression of the ZNF337 gene in various parts of the brain (specifically the cerebellum).

There are several notable SNPs in the coding sequence of ZNF337. These mutations include mostly missense and nonsense mutations.
