= TRIM37 =

Protein-coding gene in the species Homo sapiens

Identifiers
- Aliases: TRIM37, MUL, POB1, TEF3, tripartite motif containing 37
- External IDs: OMIM: 605073; MGI: 2153072; GeneCards: TRIM37
Available structures
PDB	Ortholog search: PDBe RCSB
PDB	List of PDB id codes 3LRQ
Enzyme activity
EC #	BRENDA	ExPASy	KEGG	MetaCyc
2.3.2.27	↗	↗	↗	↗

Gene location (Human)
Chr.	Chromosome 17 (human)
Band	17q22	Start	58,982,638 bp
Band	17q22	End	59,106,921 bp

Gene location (Mouse)
Chr.	Chromosome 11 (mouse)
Band	11|11 C	Start	87,017,903 bp
Band	11|11 C	End	87,111,509 bp
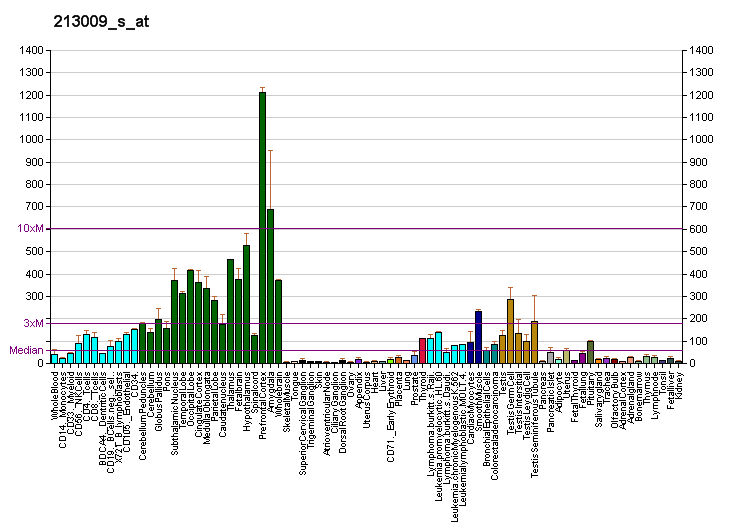
RNA expression pattern
Bgee	Human / Mouse (ortholog); Top expressed in: endothelial cell; secondary oocyte; sperm; Brodmann area 23; middle temporal gyrus; postcentral gyrus; pons; Brodmann area 46; superior frontal gyrus; frontal pole / Top expressed in: spermatocyte; spermatid; medial vestibular nucleus; pontine nuclei; primary motor cortex; deep cerebellar nuclei; medial dorsal nucleus; inferior colliculi; seminiferous tubule; central gray substance of midbrain; More reference expression data
BioGPS	More reference expression data
Gene ontology
Molecular function	protein homodimerization activity; ubiquitin protein ligase activity; zinc ion binding; chromatin binding; metal ion binding; ubiquitin-protein transferase activity; protein binding; tumor necrosis factor receptor binding; ubiquitin protein ligase binding; transferase activity
Cellular component	cytosol; ESC/E(Z) complex; intracellular anatomical structure; aggresome; perinuclear region of cytoplasm; peroxisome; cytoplasm
Biological process	negative regulation of centriole replication; positive regulation of DNA-binding transcription factor activity; negative regulation of transcription by RNA polymerase II; transcription, DNA-templated; positive regulation of NF-kappaB transcription factor activity; protein ubiquitination; negative regulation of NF-kappaB transcription factor activity; aggresome assembly; protein autoubiquitination; histone H2A monoubiquitination; histone H2A-K119 monoubiquitination
Sources:Amigo / QuickGO
Orthologs
Databases	NCBI: entry; OMA: entry
Species	Human	Mouse
Entrez	4591	68729
Ensembl	ENSG00000108395	ENSMUSG00000018548
UniProt	O94972	Q6PCX9
RefSeq (mRNA)	NM_001005207; NM_015294; NM_001320987; NM_001320988; NM_001320989 NM_001320990; NM_001353082; NM_001353083; NM_001353084; NM_001353085; NM_001353086	NM_197987; NM_001363025; NM_001363026; NM_001363027; NM_001363028
RefSeq (protein)	NP_001005207; NP_001307916; NP_001307917; NP_001307918; NP_001307919 NP_056109; NP_001340011; NP_001340012; NP_001340013; NP_001340014; NP_001340015	NP_932104; NP_001349954; NP_001349955; NP_001349956; NP_001349957
Location (UCSC)	Chr 17: 58.98 – 59.11 Mb	Chr 11: 87.02 – 87.11 Mb
PubMed search
- Wikidata
View/Edit Human	View/Edit Mouse

Tripartite motif-containing protein 37 is an E3 ubiquitin ligase in humans that is encoded by the TRIM37 gene.

== Function ==
This gene encodes a member of the tripartite motif (TRIM) family, whose members are involved in diverse cellular functions such as developmental patterning and oncogenesis. The TRIM motif includes zinc-binding domains, a RING finger region, a B-box motif and a coiled-coil domain. The RING finger and B-box domains chelate zinc and might be involved in protein–protein and/or protein–nucleic acid interactions. The gene mutations are associated with mulibrey (muscle-liver-brain-eye) nanism, an autosomal recessive disorder that involves several tissues of mesodermal origin. Alternatively spliced transcript variants encoding the same protein have been identified. It is responsible for the mono-ubiquitination of histone H2A at lysine 119, a modification commonly associated with transcriptional repression.

== Role in breast cancer ==
The 17q23 chromosomal region in which the TRIM37 gene is located has been shown to be amplified in up to 40% of breast cancers. The TRIM37 protein is thought to play a role in breast cancer oncogenesis by ubiquitinating histone H2A in regions occupied by tumor-suppressing genes. This repression of tumor-suppressing genes increases the likelihood that a tumor will occur or that an existing tumor will be more aggressive.

== Interactions ==
TRIM37 has been shown to interact with PRC1. TRIM37 has also been shown to interact with PRC2 to alter its specificity, and when TRIM37 is overexpressed, there are many changes to gene expression that lead to silencing of tumor-suppressing genes. It has also been shown that TRIM37, PRC2, PRC1 work together to co-bind to target genes, resulting in their transcriptional repression. Knockdown of TRIM37 expression via RNA-interference has shown to result in H2A becoming de-ubiquitinated and the dissociation of PRC1 and PRC2 from target genes. These changes allow the target gene to become transcriptionally active.

== See also ==
- Mulibrey nanism
