= DEAR1 =

DEAR1 is a name for multiple unrelated genes:

- DEAR1 (plant) - "DREB and EAR motif protein 1", a plant gene for immunity against infection and arthropods
- TRIM62
