= TRIM11 =

Protein-coding gene in humans

Identifiers
- Aliases: TRIM11, BIA1, RNF92, tripartite motif containing 11
- External IDs: OMIM: 607868; MGI: 2137355; GeneCards: TRIM11
Enzyme activity
EC #	BRENDA	ExPASy	KEGG	MetaCyc
2.3.2.27	↗	↗	↗	↗

Gene location (Human)
Chr.	Chromosome 1 (human)
Band	1q42.13	Start	228,393,673 bp
Band	1q42.13	End	228,406,835 bp

Gene location (Mouse)
Chr.	Chromosome 11 (mouse)
Band	11|11 B1.3	Start	58,868,919 bp
Band	11|11 B1.3	End	58,882,284 bp
RNA expression pattern
Bgee	Human / Mouse (ortholog); Top expressed in: cerebellar hemisphere; right hemisphere of cerebellum; granulocyte; oocyte; mucosa of transverse colon; spleen; mucosa of ileum; blood; cerebellar vermis; monocyte / Top expressed in: granulocyte; secondary oocyte; spermatocyte; zygote; tibiofemoral joint; corneal stroma; thymus; atrium; primary oocyte; lactiferous gland; More reference expression data
BioGPS	n/a
Gene ontology
Molecular function	ubiquitin-protein transferase activity; zinc ion binding; transcription factor binding; protein binding; protein domain specific binding; ubiquitin protein ligase activity; metal ion binding; transferase activity
Cellular component	cytoplasm; intracellular anatomical structure; nucleus; cytosol
Biological process	negative regulation of neurogenesis; innate immune response; negative regulation of transcription, DNA-templated; defense response to virus; protein ubiquitination; negative regulation of viral transcription; negative regulation of viral entry into host cell; positive regulation of viral entry into host cell
Sources:Amigo / QuickGO
Orthologs
Databases	NCBI: entry; OMA: entry
Species	Human	Mouse
Entrez	81559	94091
Ensembl	ENSG00000154370	ENSMUSG00000020455
UniProt	Q96F44	Q99PQ2
RefSeq (mRNA)	NM_145214	NM_001290988; NM_053168
RefSeq (protein)	NP_660215	NP_001277917; NP_444398
Location (UCSC)	Chr 1: 228.39 – 228.41 Mb	Chr 11: 58.87 – 58.88 Mb
PubMed search
- Wikidata
View/Edit Human	View/Edit Mouse

Tripartite motif-containing protein 11 is a protein found in humans that is encoded by the TRIM11 gene.

The protein encoded by this gene is a member of the tripartite motif (TRIM) family. The TRIM motif includes three zinc-binding domains, a RING, a B-box type 1 and a B-box type 2, and a coiled-coil region. This protein localizes to the nucleus and the cytoplasm. Its function has not been identified.
