= TRIM59 =

Human protein-coding gene

Identifiers
- Aliases: TRIM59, MRF1, RNF104, TRIM57, TSBF1, IFT80L, tripartite motif containing 59
- External IDs: OMIM: 616148; MGI: 1914199; GeneCards: TRIM59
Enzyme activity
EC #	BRENDA	ExPASy	KEGG	MetaCyc
2.3.2.27	↗	↗	↗	↗

Gene location (Human)
Chr.	Chromosome 3 (human)
Band	3q25.33	Start	160,432,445 bp
Band	3q25.33	End	160,485,773 bp

Gene location (Mouse)
Chr.	Chromosome 3 (mouse)
Band	3|3 E1	Start	68,942,621 bp
Band	3|3 E1	End	68,952,088 bp
RNA expression pattern
Bgee	Human / Mouse (ortholog); Top expressed in: oocyte; secondary oocyte; ventricular zone; testicle; ganglionic eminence; gonad; corpus callosum; trabecular bone; bone marrow; C1 segment / Top expressed in: primitive streak; fetal liver hematopoietic progenitor cell; Gonadal ridge; epiblast; ureter; abdominal wall; hair follicle; somite; mandibular prominence; maxillary prominence; More reference expression data
BioGPS	n/a
Gene ontology
Molecular function	zinc ion binding; protein binding; metal ion binding; ubiquitin protein ligase activity
Cellular component	intraciliary transport particle B; integral component of membrane; centrosome; cilium; endoplasmic reticulum membrane; endoplasmic reticulum; intracellular anatomical structure; membrane
Biological process	protein ubiquitination; negative regulation of I-kappaB kinase/NF-kappaB signaling; innate immune response; negative regulation of viral entry into host cell; cilium assembly
Sources:Amigo / QuickGO
Orthologs
Databases	NCBI: entry; OMA: entry
Species	Human	Mouse
Entrez	286827	66949
Ensembl	ENSG00000213186	ENSMUSG00000034317
UniProt	Q8IWR1	Q922Y2
RefSeq (mRNA)	NM_173084	NM_025863
RefSeq (protein)	NP_775107	NP_080139
Location (UCSC)	Chr 3: 160.43 – 160.49 Mb	Chr 3: 68.94 – 68.95 Mb
PubMed search
- Wikidata
View/Edit Human	View/Edit Mouse

Tripartite motif containing 59 is a protein that in humans is encoded by the TRIM59 gene.

== Gene ==
The human TRIM59 gene encodes tripartite motif-containing protein 59, a member of the tripartite motif (TRIM) protein family. It is expressed in multiple cell types.

== Structure ==
TRIM59 contains an N-terminal RING finger domain, a B-box domain, a coiled-coil region, and a C-terminal transmembrane domain. Its RING domain has E3 ubiquitin ligase activity.

== Function ==
TRIM59 participates in development, immune responses, and the degradation of proteins through ubiquitination. It has been implicated in tumor invasion and metastasis, as well as immune processes associated with infection, vascular disease, autoimmunity, and cancer immunity. In intrahepatic cholangiocarcinoma cells, TRIM59 has been linked to increased cell proliferation through the Akt/PKB signaling pathway while its transcription is promoted by STAT3.

== Clinical significance ==
Elevated TRIM59 expression has been associated with poorer overall survival in several cancers. A systematic review and meta-analysis supports its potential as a cancer prognostic biomarker. TRIM59 has also been proposed as a potential drug target in cancer and immune-related diseases.
