= TRIM38 =

Protein-coding gene in the species Homo sapiens

Identifiers
- Aliases: TRIM38, RNF15, RORET, tripartite motif containing 38
- External IDs: MGI: 2684869; GeneCards: TRIM38
Enzyme activity
EC #	BRENDA	ExPASy	KEGG	MetaCyc
2.3.2.27	↗	↗	↗	↗

Gene location (Human)
Chr.	Chromosome 6 (human)
Band	6p22.2	Start	25,962,802 bp
Band	6p22.2	End	25,991,231 bp

Gene location (Mouse)
Chr.	Chromosome 13 (mouse)
Band	13|13 A3.1	Start	23,953,896 bp
Band	13|13 A3.1	End	23,975,511 bp
RNA expression pattern
Bgee	Human / Mouse (ortholog); Top expressed in: cardia; renal medulla; pylorus; nipple; buccal mucosa cell; superior surface of tongue; ventral tegmental area; external globus pallidus; vena cava; trigeminal ganglion / Top expressed in: morula; blastocyst; jejunum; zygote; duodenum; colon; primary oocyte; secondary oocyte; embryo; spermatid; More reference expression data
BioGPS	n/a
Gene ontology
Molecular function	zinc ion binding; signal transducer activity; metal ion binding; protein binding; transferase activity
Cellular component	cytosol; intracellular anatomical structure
Biological process	immune system process; interferon-gamma-mediated signaling pathway; positive regulation of DNA-binding transcription factor activity; positive regulation of NF-kappaB transcription factor activity; protein ubiquitination; positive regulation of I-kappaB kinase/NF-kappaB signaling; innate immune response
Sources:Amigo / QuickGO
Orthologs
Databases	NCBI: entry; OMA: entry
Species	Human	Mouse
Entrez	10475	214158
Ensembl	ENSG00000112343	ENSMUSG00000064140
UniProt	O00635	Q5SZ99
RefSeq (mRNA)	NM_006355	NM_001029935
RefSeq (protein)	NP_006346	NP_001025106
Location (UCSC)	Chr 6: 25.96 – 25.99 Mb	Chr 13: 23.95 – 23.98 Mb
PubMed search
- Wikidata
View/Edit Human	View/Edit Mouse

Tripartite motif containing 38 is a protein that in humans is encoded by the TRIM38 gene.

== Function ==
This gene encodes a member of the tripartite motif (TRIM) family. The encoded protein contains a RING-type zinc finger, B box-type zinc finger and SPRY domain. The function of this protein has not been identified. A pseudogene of this gene is located on the long arm of chromosome 4. [provided by RefSeq, Jul 2012].
