= TRIM33 =

Protein-coding gene in humans

Identifiers
- Aliases: TRIM33, ECTO, PTC7, RFG7, TF1G, TIF1G, TIF1GAMMA, TIFGAMMA, tripartite motif containing 33
- External IDs: OMIM: 605769; MGI: 2137357; GeneCards: TRIM33
Available structures
PDB	Ortholog search: PDBe RCSB
PDB	List of PDB id codes 3U5M, 3U5N, 3U5O, 3U5P
Enzyme activity
EC #	BRENDA	ExPASy	KEGG	MetaCyc
2.3.2.27	↗	↗	↗	↗

Gene location (Human)
Chr.	Chromosome 1 (human)
Band	1p13.2	Start	114,392,790 bp
Band	1p13.2	End	114,511,203 bp

Gene location (Mouse)
Chr.	Chromosome 3 (mouse)
Band	3|3 F2.2	Start	103,186,609 bp
Band	3|3 F2.2	End	103,266,091 bp
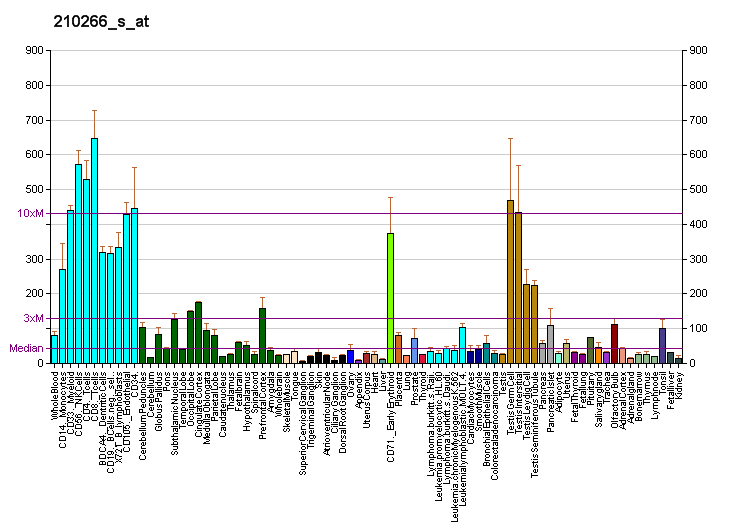

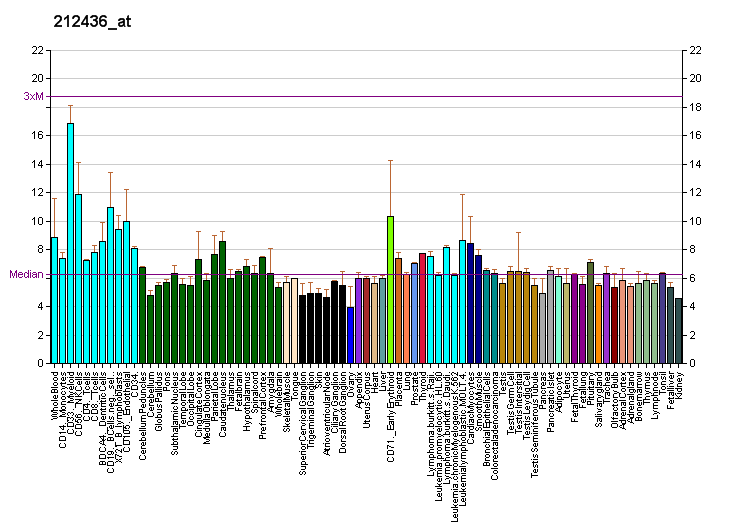

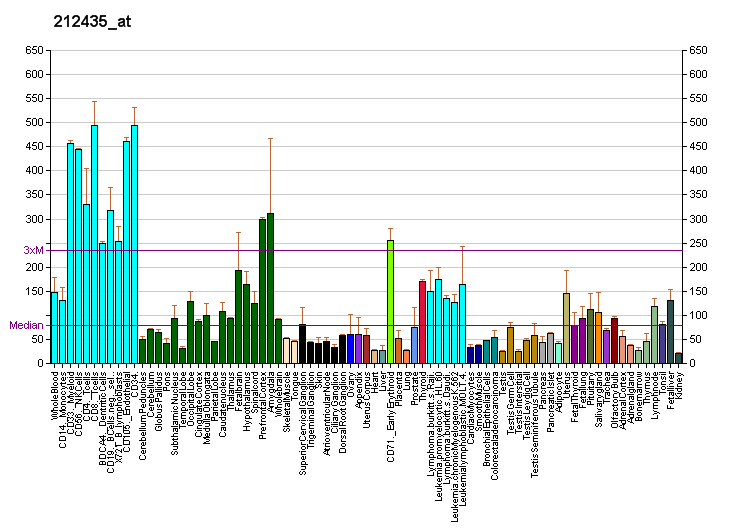
RNA expression pattern
Bgee	Human / Mouse (ortholog); Top expressed in: secondary oocyte; Epithelium of choroid plexus; Brodmann area 23; corpus epididymis; nipple; cerebellar vermis; tibia; Region I of hippocampus proper; epithelium of nasopharynx; seminal vesicula / Top expressed in: genital tubercle; primitive streak; tail of embryo; ciliary body; zygote; trigeminal ganglion; iris; Epithelium of choroid plexus; retinal pigment epithelium; secondary oocyte; More reference expression data
BioGPS	More reference expression data
Gene ontology
Molecular function	DNA binding; R-SMAD binding; co-SMAD binding; zinc ion binding; metal ion binding; ubiquitin-protein transferase activity; protein binding; transferase activity
Cellular component	intracellular anatomical structure; nucleus; nucleoplasm
Biological process	regulation of transcription, DNA-templated; negative regulation of transcription by RNA polymerase II; regulation of transforming growth factor beta receptor signaling pathway; negative regulation of BMP signaling pathway; protein ubiquitination; negative regulation of transcription, DNA-templated; transcription, DNA-templated
Sources:Amigo / QuickGO
Orthologs
Databases	NCBI: entry; OMA: entry
Species	Human	Mouse
Entrez	51592	94093
Ensembl	ENSG00000197323	ENSMUSG00000033014
UniProt	Q9UPN9	Q99PP7
RefSeq (mRNA)	NM_015906; NM_033020	NM_001079830; NM_053170
RefSeq (protein)	NP_056990; NP_148980	NP_001073299; NP_444400
Location (UCSC)	Chr 1: 114.39 – 114.51 Mb	Chr 3: 103.19 – 103.27 Mb
PubMed search
- Wikidata
View/Edit Human	View/Edit Mouse

E3 ubiquitin-protein ligase TRIM33, also known as (ectodermin homolog and tripartite motif-containing 33), is a protein encoded in the human by the gene TRIM33, a member of the tripartite motif family.

TRIM33 is thought to be a transcriptional corepressor. However unlike the related TRIM24 and TRIM28 proteins, few transcription factors such as SMAD4 that interact with TRIM33 have been identified.

== Structure ==
The protein is a member of the tripartite motif family. This motif includes three zinc-binding domains:

- RING
- B-box type 1 zinc finger
- B-box type 2 zinc finger

and a coiled-coil region.

Three alternatively spliced transcript variants for this gene have been described, however, the full-length nature of one variant has not been determined.

== Interactions ==
TRIM33 has been shown to interact with TRIM24.

== Role in cancer ==
TRIM33 acts as a tumor suppressor gene preventing the development chronic myelomonocytic leukemia. TRIM33 regulates also the TRIM28 receptor and promotes physiological aging of hematopoietic stem cells. TRIM33 acts as an oncogene by preventing apoptosis in B-cell leukemias.
