= TRIM45 =

Protein-coding gene in humans

Identifiers
- Aliases: TRIM45, RNF99, tripartite motif containing 45
- External IDs: OMIM: 609318; MGI: 1918187; GeneCards: TRIM45
Available structures
PDB	Ortholog search: PDBe RCSB
PDB	List of PDB id codes 2DS4
Enzyme activity
EC #	BRENDA	ExPASy	KEGG	MetaCyc
2.3.2.27	↗	↗	↗	↗

Gene location (Human)
Chr.	Chromosome 1 (human)
Band	1p13.1	Start	117,111,060 bp
Band	1p13.1	End	117,122,587 bp

Gene location (Mouse)
Chr.	Chromosome 3 (mouse)
Band	3|3 F2.2	Start	100,829,518 bp
Band	3|3 F2.2	End	100,844,236 bp
RNA expression pattern
Bgee	Human / Mouse (ortholog); Top expressed in: secondary oocyte; right uterine tube; apex of heart; testicle; muscle of thigh; gastrocnemius muscle; right auricle of heart; gonad; tibialis anterior muscle; deltoid muscle / Top expressed in: otolith organ; utricle; vestibular sensory epithelium; olfactory system; olfactory epithelium; seminiferous tubule; internal carotid artery; external carotid artery; spermatid; Jacobson's organ; More reference expression data
BioGPS	n/a
Gene ontology
Molecular function	zinc ion binding; metal ion binding
Cellular component	intracellular anatomical structure; nucleus; nucleoplasm; intercellular bridge; cytoplasm; cytosol
Biological process	bone development
Sources:Amigo / QuickGO
Orthologs
Databases	NCBI: entry; OMA: entry
Species	Human	Mouse
Entrez	80263	229644
Ensembl	ENSG00000134253	ENSMUSG00000033233
UniProt	Q9H8W5	Q6PFY8
RefSeq (mRNA)	NM_001145635; NM_025188	NM_001165952; NM_001165953; NM_194343
RefSeq (protein)	NP_001139107; NP_079464	NP_001159424; NP_001159425; NP_919324
Location (UCSC)	Chr 1: 117.11 – 117.12 Mb	Chr 3: 100.83 – 100.84 Mb
PubMed search
- Wikidata
View/Edit Human	View/Edit Mouse

tripartite motif containing 45, also known as TRIM45, is a human gene.

This gene encodes a member of the tripartite motif family. The encoded protein may function as a [transcriptional repressor of the mitogen-activated protein kinase pathway. Alternatively spliced transcript variants have been described.
