= TRIM52 =

Protein-coding gene found in humans

Identifiers
- Aliases: TRIM52, RNF102, tripartite motif containing 52
- External IDs: MGI: 3045276; GeneCards: TRIM52
Enzyme activity
EC #	BRENDA	ExPASy	KEGG	MetaCyc
2.3.2.27	↗	↗	↗	↗

Gene location (Human)
Chr.	Chromosome 5 (human)
Band	5q35.3	Start	181,254,077 bp
Band	5q35.3	End	181,261,150 bp

Gene location (Mouse)
Chr.	Chromosome 14 (mouse)
Band	14|14 E2.3	Start	106,343,632 bp
Band	14|14 E2.3	End	106,373,293 bp
RNA expression pattern
Bgee	Human / Mouse (ortholog); Top expressed in: buccal mucosa cell; cerebellar hemisphere; right hemisphere of cerebellum; right uterine tube; left lobe of thyroid gland; right lobe of thyroid gland; granulocyte; pituitary gland; anterior pituitary; left ovary / Top expressed in: testicle; spermatid; spermatocyte; embryo; primary oocyte; secondary oocyte; zygote; blastocyst; liver; spleen; More reference expression data
BioGPS	n/a
Gene ontology
Molecular function	zinc ion binding; metal ion binding
Cellular component	intracellular anatomical structure; nuclear body
Biological process	positive regulation of NF-kappaB transcription factor activity
Sources:Amigo / QuickGO
Orthologs
Databases	NCBI: entry; OMA: entry
Species	Human	Mouse
Entrez	84851	212085
Ensembl	ENSG00000183718	ENSMUSG00000022113
UniProt	Q96A61	Q8CDV4
RefSeq (mRNA)	NM_032765; NM_001346048; NM_001346049; NM_001346050; NM_001346051	NM_198601
RefSeq (protein)	NP_001332977; NP_001332978; NP_001332979; NP_001332980; NP_116154 NP_116154.1	NP_941003
Location (UCSC)	Chr 5: 181.25 – 181.26 Mb	Chr 14: 106.34 – 106.37 Mb
PubMed search
- Wikidata
View/Edit Human	View/Edit Mouse

TRIM52, also known as RNF102, is a protein in the tripartite motif family. In humans, it is encoded by the gene of the same name. Knockdown of this gene induces apoptosis. This gene's overexpression has been implicated in multiple types of cancer including ovarian cancer, gastric cancer, and colon cancer.
