= Tripartite motif containing 65 =

Protein-coding gene in the species Homo sapiens

TRIM65

Identifiers
- Aliases: TRIM65, 4732463G12Rik, tripartite motif containing 65
- External IDs: MGI: 2442815; GeneCards: TRIM65
Enzyme activity
EC #	BRENDA	ExPASy	KEGG	MetaCyc
2.3.2.27	↗	↗	↗	↗

Gene location (Human)
Chr.	Chromosome 17 (human)
Band	17q25.1	Start	75,880,335 bp
Band	17q25.1	End	75,896,951 bp

Gene location (Mouse)
Chr.	Chromosome 11 (mouse)
Band	11|11 E2	Start	116,012,672 bp
Band	11|11 E2	End	116,021,954 bp
RNA expression pattern
Bgee	Human / Mouse (ortholog); Top expressed in: buccal mucosa cell; tendon of biceps brachii; mucosa of ileum; granulocyte; cerebellar hemisphere; right hemisphere of cerebellum; canal of the cervix; body of uterus; right coronary artery; ectocervix / Top expressed in: aortic valve; ascending aorta; esophagus; right kidney; muscle of thigh; proximal tubule; Paneth cell; thymus; blood; duodenum; More reference expression data
BioGPS	n/a
Gene ontology
Molecular function	zinc ion binding; metal ion binding
Cellular component	intracellular anatomical structure; nucleus; nucleoplasm; cytosol
Biological process	positive regulation of autophagy
Sources:Amigo / QuickGO
Orthologs
Databases	NCBI: entry; OMA: entry
Species	Human	Mouse
Entrez	201292	338364
Ensembl	ENSG00000141569	ENSMUSG00000054517
UniProt	Q6PJ69	Q8BFW4
RefSeq (mRNA)	NM_001256124; NM_173547	NM_178802
RefSeq (protein)	NP_001243053; NP_775818	NP_848917
Location (UCSC)	Chr 17: 75.88 – 75.9 Mb	Chr 11: 116.01 – 116.02 Mb
PubMed search
- Wikidata
View/Edit Human	View/Edit Mouse

E3 ubiquitin-protein ligase TRIM65 is a protein that in humans is encoded by the TRIM65 gene. The protein is a member of tripartite motif family (TRIM).

== See also ==
- E3 ubiquitin-protein ligase
