= TRIM16 =

Gene of the species Homo sapiens

Identifiers
- Aliases: TRIM16, EBBP, tripartite motif containing 16
- External IDs: OMIM: 609505; MGI: 2137356; GeneCards: TRIM16
Enzyme activity
EC #	BRENDA	ExPASy	KEGG	MetaCyc
2.3.2.27	↗	↗	↗	↗

Gene location (Mouse)
Chr.	Chromosome 11 (mouse)
Band	11|11 B2	Start	62,711,057 bp
Band	11|11 B2	End	62,741,634 bp
Gene ontology
Molecular function	DNA binding; zinc ion binding; interleukin-1 binding; protein binding; metal ion binding; NACHT domain binding; transferase activity
Cellular component	cytoplasm; PML body; intracellular anatomical structure; cytosol; plasma membrane
Biological process	histone H4 acetylation; positive regulation of keratinocyte differentiation; positive regulation of transcription, DNA-templated; response to organophosphorus; positive regulation of retinoic acid receptor signaling pathway; response to retinoic acid; histone H3 acetylation; response to growth hormone
Sources:Amigo / QuickGO
Orthologs
Databases	NCBI: entry; OMA: entry
Species	Human	Mouse
Entrez	10626	94092
Ensembl	ENSG00000221926	ENSMUSG00000047821
UniProt	O95361	Q99PP9
RefSeq (mRNA)	NM_006470	NM_053169
RefSeq (protein)	NP_006461; NP_001335049; NP_001335050; NP_001335051; NP_001335053 NP_001335054; NP_001335055; NP_001335048	NP_444399
Location (UCSC)	n/a	Chr 11: 62.71 – 62.74 Mb
PubMed search
- Wikidata
View/Edit Human	View/Edit Mouse

Tripartite motif-containing protein 16 is a protein that in humans is encoded by the TRIM16 gene.

This gene was identified as an estrogen and anti-estrogen regulated gene in epithelial cells stably expressing estrogen receptor. The protein encoded by this gene contains two B box domains and a coiled-coiled region that are characteristic of the B box zinc finger protein family.

The proteins of this family have been reported to be involved in a variety of biological processes including cell growth, differentiation and pathogenesis. Recent research has showed that TRIM16 acts as an E3 ubiquitin ligase and molecular scaffold that participates in protein-quality control, tumor suppression, and protection against cardiac hypertrophy. TRIM16 is expressed in many tissues and participates in cellular pathways that maintain proteostasis and regulate stress responses.

== Structure ==
The protein contains two B-box domains and a coiled-coil motif typical of the TRIM family, but lacks a canonical RING domain. These structural elements allow TRIM16 to mediate protein-protein interactions and to act as a ubiquitin-ligase adaptor. Early studies identified it as an estrogen-responsive gene in epithelial cells expressing the estrogen receptor, and expression has since been observed in most human tissues.

== Function ==
TRIM16 has indeed been found to modulate both the formation and turnover of misfolded protein aggregates. TRIM16 functions as an E3 ubiquitin ligase that bridges ubiquitinated substrates to autophagic receptors, integrating the sequestration of aggregation-prone proteins and stimulating their autophagic degradation. In light of its two roles in the formation and removal of aggregates, TRIM16 may play a role in maintaining protein homeostasis under cellular stress.

Further investigation revealed that TRIM16 is intimately associated with the p62-KEAP1-NRF2 pathway, a significant oxidative stress regulator. Usually, KEAP1 binds NRF2 and targets it for degradation, but under oxidative stress, TRIM16 disrupts this interaction and stabilizes NRF2, leading to the increased expression of antioxidant genes. TRIM16 thus serves as a link between the antioxidant response and the protein-quality control system.

TRIM16 also acts as a platform for other autophagy-related proteins, including ULK1, ATG16L1, and LC3B, thereby facilitating the formation of autophagosomes responsible for the degradation of damaged proteins.In this regard, TRIM16 helps cells cope with a proteotoxic environment by orchestrating protein aggregate formation and subsequent disassembly. Because TRIM16 can promote aggregate formation when conditions require it and then favor its subsequent degradation, this makes TRIM16 an exceptionally versatile component of the proteostasis network.

TRIM16 also interacts with transcription factor E2F1 and cytoskeletal protein vimentin, thus modulating cell-cycle progression and structural stability, and further extends its reach outside of stress regulation into the realm of general cell behavior.

== Clinical significance ==
=== Tumor suppression ===
In neuroblastoma and other cancer models, TRIM16 can take on a tumor suppressive function. Its interaction with vimentin prevents cell migration and proliferation.Such interactions reduce tumor growth and oncogenic signaling, suggesting loss in the activity of TRIM16 may facilitate cancer development.

Further study has identified that many aggressive cancers have reduced expression of TRIM16, which impairs the cell's ability to regulate cell proliferation and maintain structural integrity. The tumor suppressor capabilities of TRIM16 were also supported by studies where forced expression of TRIM16 in tumor cells diminished growth and metastatic potential. TRIM16 also was associated with the retinoic acid signaling pathway, a differentiation pathway that can push cancer cells toward less malignant states.

=== Cardiac hypertrophy ===
TRIM16 also has a protective function in the cardiovascular system. TRIM16 restricts oxidative stress and cardiomyocyte hypertrophy by repressing pathological cardiac hypertrophy through the PRDX1-Nrf2 antioxidant pathway.

TRIM16 also controls the activity of SRC kinase by labeling it for K48-linked ubiquintation, thereby decreasing SRC's contribution to hypertrophic signaling. It further modulates the activity of PRDX1 to promote NRF2-HO-1 pathway activation and increase antioxidant capacity in cardiomyocytes. This set of interactions protects the heart from oxidative damage and abnormal structural enlargement.

Overexpression of TRIM16 in mouse models prevented the development of more severe hypertrophy, increased fibrosis, and decreased heart function caused by TRIM16 loss. In addition, reduced TRIM16 levels were found in human hypertrophic heart samples, suggesting a potential diagnostic or therapeutic role.
