= TRIM6 =

Protein-coding gene in the species Homo sapiens

Identifiers
- Aliases: TRIM6, RNF89, tripartite motif containing 6
- External IDs: OMIM: 607564; MGI: 2137352; GeneCards: TRIM6
Enzyme activity
EC #	BRENDA	ExPASy	KEGG	MetaCyc
2.3.2.27	↗	↗	↗	↗

Gene location (Human)
Chr.	Chromosome 11 (human)
Band	11p15.4	Start	5,596,109 bp
Band	11p15.4	End	5,612,958 bp

Gene location (Mouse)
Chr.	Chromosome 7 (mouse)
Band	7 E3|7 55.55 cM	Start	103,868,000 bp
Band	7 E3|7 55.55 cM	End	103,884,359 bp
RNA expression pattern
Bgee	Human / Mouse (ortholog); Top expressed in: oocyte; secondary oocyte; gonad; human kidney; parotid gland; palpebral conjunctiva; germinal epithelium; tibia; testicle; parietal pleura / Top expressed in: yolk sac; morula; blastocyst; embryo; epiblast; primitive streak; spermatocyte; embryo; tail of embryo; secondary oocyte; More reference expression data
BioGPS	n/a
Gene ontology
Molecular function	protein-macromolecule adaptor activity; protein tyrosine kinase binding; ubiquitin protein ligase activity; zinc ion binding; transcription factor binding; metal ion binding; protein binding; protein kinase binding; transferase activity
Cellular component	cytoplasm; cytosol; intracellular anatomical structure; nucleus
Biological process	positive regulation of transcription regulatory region DNA binding; cellular response to virus; positive regulation of type I interferon-mediated signaling pathway; regulation of NIK/NF-kappaB signaling; free ubiquitin chain polymerization; cellular response to interferon-beta; protein trimerization; protein polyubiquitination; negative regulation of gene expression; positive regulation of peptidyl-serine phosphorylation; negative regulation of stem cell differentiation; response to lipopolysaccharide; negative regulation of viral genome replication; positive regulation of gene expression; positive regulation of peptidyl-threonine phosphorylation; protein ubiquitination; negative regulation of transcription, DNA-templated; positive regulation of defense response to virus by host; viral process
Sources:Amigo / QuickGO
Orthologs
Databases	NCBI: entry; OMA: entry
Species	Human	Mouse
Entrez	117854	94088
Ensembl	ENSG00000121236	ENSMUSG00000072244
UniProt	Q9C030	Q8BGE7
RefSeq (mRNA)	NM_058166; NM_001003818; NM_001198644; NM_001198645	NM_001013616
RefSeq (protein)	NP_001003818; NP_001185573; NP_001185574; NP_477514	NP_001013637
Location (UCSC)	Chr 11: 5.6 – 5.61 Mb	Chr 7: 103.87 – 103.88 Mb
PubMed search
- Wikidata
View/Edit Human	View/Edit Mouse

Tripartite motif-containing protein 6 is a protein that in humans is encoded by the TRIM6 gene.

The protein encoded by this gene is a member of the tripartite motif (TRIM) family. The TRIM motif includes three zinc-binding domains, a RING, a B-box type 1 and a B-box type 2, and a coiled-coil region.

The protein localizes to the nucleus, but its specific function has not been identified. This gene is mapped to chromosome 11p15, where it resides within a TRIM gene cluster. Two alternatively spliced transcript variants encoding distinct isoforms have been found for this gene. A read-through transcript transcribed from this gene and TRIM34 has been observed.
