= Tripartite motif containing 34 =

Protein found in humans

TRIM34

Identifiers
- Aliases: TRIM34, IFP1, RNF21, tripartite motif containing 34
- External IDs: OMIM: 605684; GeneCards: TRIM34
Available structures
PDB	Human UniProt search: PDBe RCSB
PDB	List of PDB id codes 2EGP
Enzyme activity
EC #	BRENDA	ExPASy	KEGG	MetaCyc
2.3.2.27	↗	↗	↗	↗

Gene location (Human)
Chr.	Chromosome 11 (human)
Band	11p15.4	Start	5,619,764 bp
Band	11p15.4	End	5,644,398 bp
RNA expression pattern
Bgee	Human / Mouse (ortholog); Top expressed in: monocyte; lymph node; blood; spleen; placenta; granulocyte; appendix; right adrenal gland; right adrenal cortex; rectum / n/a; More reference expression data
BioGPS	n/a
Gene ontology
Molecular function	zinc ion binding; metal ion binding; molecular function
Cellular component	cytoplasm; cytosol; intracellular anatomical structure
Biological process	protein trimerization; positive regulation of DNA-binding transcription factor activity; defense response to virus; interferon-gamma-mediated signaling pathway
Sources:Amigo / QuickGO
Orthologs
Databases	NCBI: entry; OMA: entry
Species	Human	Mouse
Entrez	53840	n/a
Ensembl	ENSG00000258659	n/a
UniProt	Q9BYJ4	n/a
RefSeq (mRNA)	NM_130390; NM_001003827; NM_021616; NM_130389	n/a
RefSeq (protein)	NP_001003827; NP_067629; NP_569074	n/a
Location (UCSC)	Chr 11: 5.62 – 5.64 Mb	n/a
PubMed search		n/a
- Wikidata
View/Edit Human

Tripartite motif containing 34 is a protein that, in humans, is encoded by the TRIM34 gene.

== Function ==
The protein encoded by this gene is a member of the tripartite motif family (TRIM). The TRIM motif includes three zinc-binding domains, a RING, B-box type 1 and B-box type 2 domain, and a coiled-coil region. Expression of this gene is up-regulated by interferon. This gene is mapped to chromosome 11p15, where it resides within a TRIM gene cluster. Alternative splicing results in multiple transcript variants. A read-through transcript from the upstream TRIM6 gene has also been observed, which results in a fusion product from these neighboring family members.
