= TRIM50 =

Protein found in humans

Identifiers
- Aliases: TRIM50, TRIM50A, tripartite motif containing 50
- External IDs: OMIM: 612548; MGI: 2664992; GeneCards: TRIM50
Enzyme activity
EC #	BRENDA	ExPASy	KEGG	MetaCyc
2.3.2.27	↗	↗	↗	↗

Gene location (Human)
Chr.	Chromosome 7 (human)
Band	7q11.23	Start	73,312,536 bp
Band	7q11.23	End	73,328,082 bp

Gene location (Mouse)
Chr.	Chromosome 5 (mouse)
Band	5|5 G2	Start	135,382,149 bp
Band	5|5 G2	End	135,396,859 bp
RNA expression pattern
Bgee	Human / Mouse (ortholog); Top expressed in: body of pancreas; body of stomach; gonad; oocyte; secondary oocyte; right testis; left testis; fundus; human kidney; cardia / Top expressed in: stomach; embryo; embryo; secondary oocyte; primary oocyte; pancreas; ovary; blastocyst; islet of Langerhans; duodenum; More reference expression data
BioGPS	n/a
Gene ontology
Molecular function	metal ion binding; zinc ion binding; identical protein binding; transferase activity
Cellular component	cytoplasm; intracellular anatomical structure; cytosol; aggresome
Biological process	metabolism; regulation of establishment of protein localization
Sources:Amigo / QuickGO
Orthologs
Databases	NCBI: entry; OMA: entry
Species	Human	Mouse
Entrez	135892	215061
Ensembl	ENSG00000146755	ENSMUSG00000053388
UniProt	Q86XT4	Q810I2
RefSeq (mRNA)	NM_001281450; NM_001281451; NM_178125	NM_178240; NM_001346745
RefSeq (protein)	NP_001268379; NP_001268380; NP_835226	NP_001333674; NP_839971
Location (UCSC)	Chr 7: 73.31 – 73.33 Mb	Chr 5: 135.38 – 135.4 Mb
PubMed search
- Wikidata
View/Edit Human	View/Edit Mouse

Tripartite motif-containing 50, also known as TRIM50, is a human gene. TRIM50 encodes an E3 ubiquitin ligase. The protein encoded by this gene is a member of the tripartite motif (TRIM) family, also called the 'RING-B-box-coiled-coil' (RBCC) subgroup of RING finger proteins. The gene is located at 7q11.23, near two homologous genes, TRIM73 and TRIM74. TRIM50 is deleted in Williams syndrome, a multisystem developmental disorder caused by the deletion of contiguous genes at 7q11.23.
