= TRIM15 =

Protein-coding gene in the species Homo sapiens

Identifiers
- Aliases: TRIM15, RNF93, ZNF178, ZNFB7, tripartite motif containing 15
- External IDs: MGI: 1916347; GeneCards: TRIM15
Enzyme activity
EC #	BRENDA	ExPASy	KEGG	MetaCyc
2.3.2.27	↗	↗	↗	↗

Gene location (Human)
Chr.	Chromosome 6 (human)
Band	6p22.1	Start	30,163,206 bp
Band	6p22.1	End	30,172,693 bp

Gene location (Mouse)
Chr.	Chromosome 17 (mouse)
Band	17|17 B1	Start	37,171,583 bp
Band	17|17 B1	End	37,178,102 bp
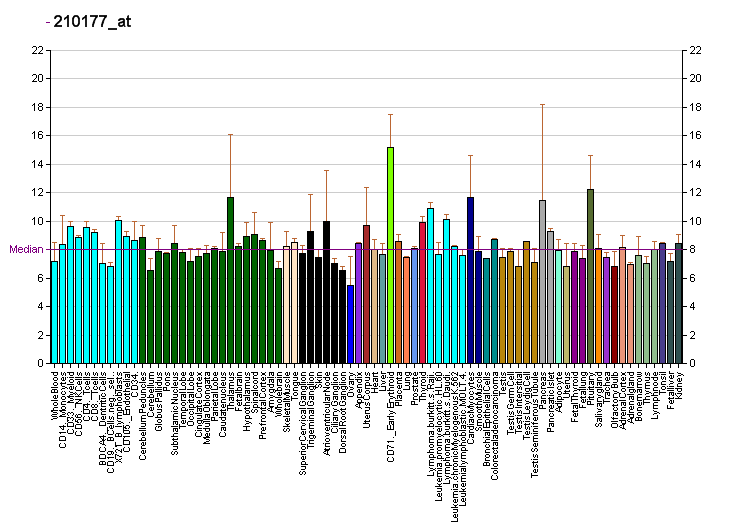

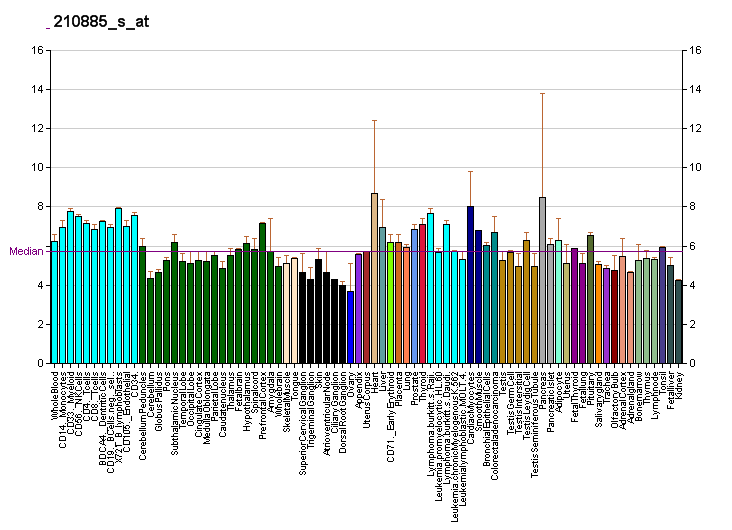

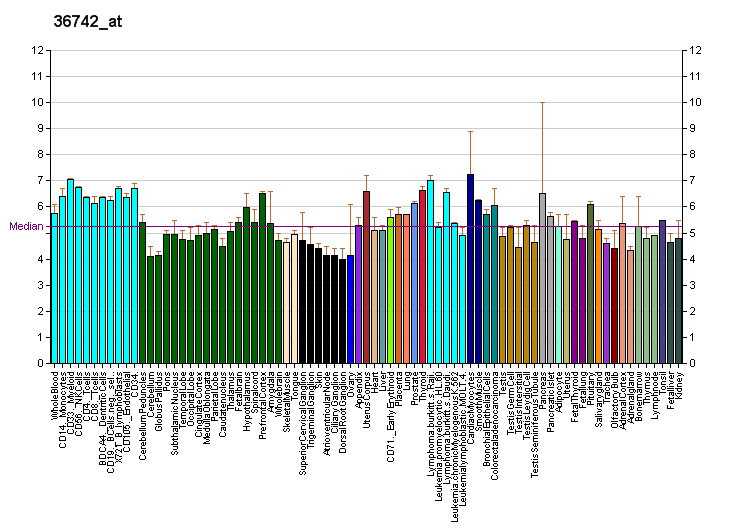
RNA expression pattern
Bgee	Human / Mouse (ortholog); Top expressed in: duodenum; mucosa of transverse colon; rectum; right lobe of liver; gallbladder; human kidney; appendix; epithelium of colon; smooth muscle tissue; islet of Langerhans / Top expressed in: intestinal villus; ileum; jejunum; primary oocyte; epithelium of small intestine; duodenum; secondary oocyte; zygote; yolk sac; embryo; More reference expression data
BioGPS	More reference expression data
Gene ontology
Molecular function	zinc ion binding; protein binding; metal ion binding
Cellular component	intracellular anatomical structure
Biological process	mesodermal cell fate determination; positive regulation of DNA-binding transcription factor activity; innate immune response; positive regulation of RIG-I signaling pathway; positive regulation of NF-kappaB transcription factor activity; positive regulation of type I interferon production; negative regulation of intracellular transport of viral material
Sources:Amigo / QuickGO
Orthologs
Databases	NCBI: entry; OMA: entry
Species	Human	Mouse
Entrez	89870	69097
Ensembl	ENSG00000235960; ENSG00000227147; ENSG00000233599; ENSG00000204610; ENSG00000224145 ENSG00000235905; ENSG00000137384; ENSG00000235259	ENSMUSG00000050747
UniProt	Q9C019	n/a
RefSeq (mRNA)	NM_033229; NM_052812	NM_001024134; NM_001177872
RefSeq (protein)	NP_150232	n/a
Location (UCSC)	Chr 6: 30.16 – 30.17 Mb	Chr 17: 37.17 – 37.18 Mb
PubMed search
- Wikidata
View/Edit Human	View/Edit Mouse

Tripartite motif-containing protein 15 is a protein that in humans is encoded by the TRIM15 gene.

The protein encoded by this gene is a member of the tripartite motif (TRIM) family. The TRIM motif includes three zinc-binding domains, a RING, a B-box type 1 and a B-box type 2, and a coiled-coil region. The protein localizes to the cytoplasm. Its function has not been identified. Alternate splicing of this gene results in two transcript variants encoding different isoforms.
