= TRIM24 =

Protein-coding gene in the species Homo sapiens

Identifiers
- Aliases: TRIM24, PTC6, RNF82, TF1A, TIF1, TIF1A, TIF1ALPHA, hTIF1, tripartite motif containing 24
- External IDs: OMIM: 603406; MGI: 109275; GeneCards: TRIM24
Available structures
PDB	Ortholog search: PDBe RCSB
PDB	List of PDB id codes 2YYN, 3O33, 3O34, 3O35, 3O36, 3O37, 4YAB, 4YAD, 4YAT, 4YAX, 4YBM, 4YBS, 4YBT, 4YC9, 4ZQL
Enzyme activity
EC #	BRENDA	ExPASy	KEGG	MetaCyc
2.3.2.27	↗	↗	↗	↗

Gene location (Human)
Chr.	Chromosome 7 (human)
Band	7q33-q34	Start	138,460,259 bp
Band	7q33-q34	End	138,589,996 bp

Gene location (Mouse)
Chr.	Chromosome 6 (mouse)
Band	6|6 B1	Start	37,847,746 bp
Band	6|6 B1	End	37,943,231 bp
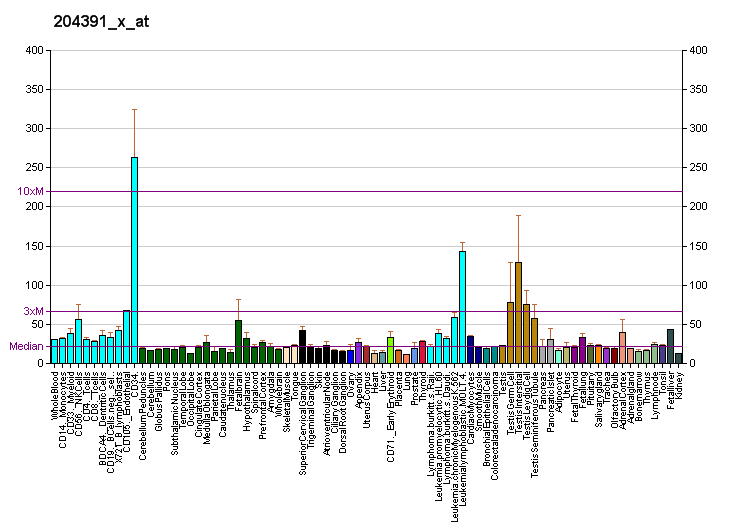

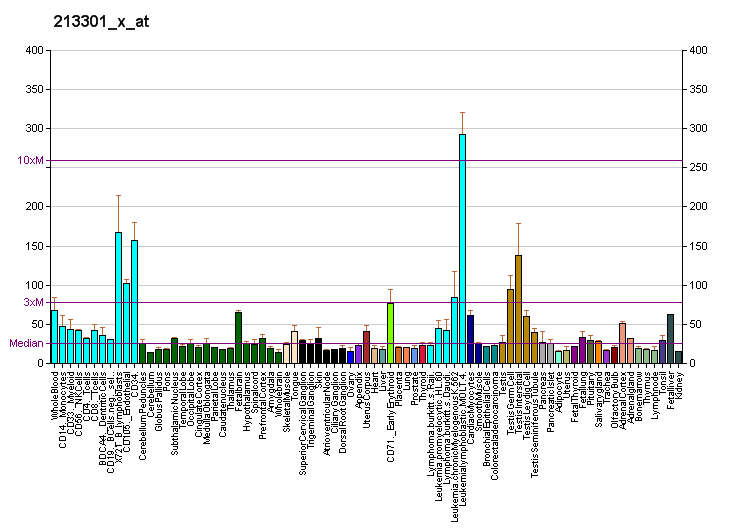
RNA expression pattern
Bgee	Human / Mouse (ortholog); Top expressed in: sperm; ganglionic eminence; ventricular zone; right adrenal cortex; parotid gland; left adrenal gland; endothelial cell; left adrenal cortex; gonad; Skeletal muscle tissue of biceps brachii / Top expressed in: zygote; secondary oocyte; spermatid; spermatocyte; genital tubercle; seminiferous tubule; tail of embryo; primary oocyte; lacrimal gland; parotid gland; More reference expression data
BioGPS	More reference expression data
Gene ontology
Molecular function	protein kinase activity; sequence-specific DNA binding; DNA binding; ubiquitin protein ligase activity; transcription coactivator activity; zinc ion binding; p53 binding; chromatin binding; metal ion binding; ubiquitin-protein transferase activity; methylated histone binding; estrogen response element binding; protein binding; nuclear receptor binding; lysine-acetylated histone binding; signaling receptor binding; protein tyrosine kinase activity; transferase activity
Cellular component	cytoplasm; cytosol; intracellular anatomical structure; perichromatin fibrils; nucleus; nucleoplasm
Biological process	regulation of apoptotic process; regulation of transcription, DNA-templated; regulation of protein stability; calcium ion homeostasis; regulation of signal transduction by p53 class mediator; regulation of vitamin D receptor signaling pathway; transcription by RNA polymerase II; transcription, DNA-templated; cellular response to estrogen stimulus; positive regulation of transcription, DNA-templated; protein phosphorylation; positive regulation of gene expression; protein catabolic process; protein ubiquitination; protein autophosphorylation; negative regulation of transcription, DNA-templated; negative regulation of cell population proliferation; peptidyl-tyrosine phosphorylation
Sources:Amigo / QuickGO
Orthologs
Databases	NCBI: entry; OMA: entry
Species	Human	Mouse
Entrez	8805	21848
Ensembl	ENSG00000122779	ENSMUSG00000029833
UniProt	O15164	Q64127
RefSeq (mRNA)	NM_003852; NM_015905	NM_001272064; NM_001272076; NM_145076
RefSeq (protein)	NP_003843; NP_056989	NP_001258993; NP_001259005; NP_659542
Location (UCSC)	Chr 7: 138.46 – 138.59 Mb	Chr 6: 37.85 – 37.94 Mb
PubMed search
- Wikidata
View/Edit Human	View/Edit Mouse

Tripartite motif-containing 24 (TRIM24) also known as transcriptional intermediary factor 1α (TIF1α) is a protein that, in humans, is encoded by the TRIM24 gene.

== Function ==
The protein encoded by this gene mediates transcriptional control by interaction with the activation function 2 (AF2) region of several nuclear receptors, including the estrogen, retinoic acid, and vitamin D_{3} receptors. The protein localizes to nuclear bodies and is thought to associate with chromatin and heterochromatin-associated factors. The protein is a member of the tripartite motif (TRIM) family. The TRIM motif includes three zinc-binding domains – a RING, a B-box type 1 and a B-box type 2 – and a coiled-coil region. Two alternatively spliced transcript variants encoding different isoforms have been described for this gene.

== Interactions ==
TRIM24 has been shown to interact with Mineralocorticoid receptor, TRIM33, Estrogen receptor alpha and Retinoid X receptor alpha.

== See also ==
- Transcription coregulator
