= Pan troglodytes endogenous retrovirus-1 =

Virus classification
- (unranked): Virus
- Realm: Riboviria
- Kingdom: Pararnavirae
- Phylum: Artverviricota
- Class: Revtraviricetes
- Order: Ortervirales
- Family: Retroviridae
- Genus: Gammaretrovirus
- Species: incertae sedis
- Virus: Pan troglodytes endogenous retrovirus-1

Virus that possibly infected ancient chimpanzees

Pan troglodytes endogenous retrovirus-1 (PtERV1), or chimpanzee endogenous retrovirus-1 (CERV1), is a retrovirus that putatively infected chimpanzees about 4 million years ago, and may have been involved in the process of speciation, making the chimpanzee and human lines diverge.

Kaiser et al. have suggested that TRIM5α may have played a critical role in the human immune defense system about 4 million years ago, when the retrovirus was infecting chimpanzees. While no trace of PtERV1 has yet been found in the human genome, about 130 traces of PtERV1 DNA have been found endogenized in the genome of modern chimpanzees. After recreating part of the PtERV1 retrovirus, it was reported that TRIM5α prevents the virus from entering human cells in vitro. While this cellular defense mechanism may have been very useful 4 million years ago when facing a PtERV1 epidemic, it has the side effect of leaving cells more susceptible to attack by the HIV-1 retrovirus. Recently, doubt has been cast over the conclusions made by Kaiser et al. By using a PtERV1 capsid, which produces higher titer virus-like particles, Perez-Caballero et al. reported that PtERV1 is not restricted by either human or chimpanzee TRIM5α.
