= TRIM5 =

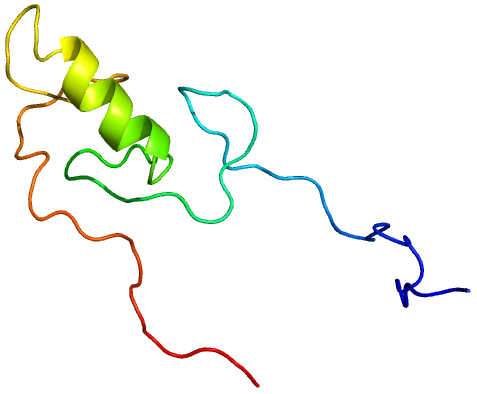

Identifiers
- Aliases: TRIM5, RNF88, TRIM5alpha, tripartite motif containing 5
- External IDs: OMIM: 608487; MGI: 4821183; GeneCards: TRIM5
Available structures
PDB	Ortholog search: PDBe RCSB
PDB	List of PDB id codes 2ECV, 2YRG
Enzyme activity
EC #	BRENDA	ExPASy	KEGG	MetaCyc
2.3.2.27	↗	↗	↗	↗

Gene location (Human)
Chr.	Chromosome 11 (human)
Band	11p15.4	Start	5,663,195 bp
Band	11p15.4	End	5,938,619 bp

Gene location (Mouse)
Chr.	Chromosome 7 (mouse)
Band	7|7 E3	Start	103,987,961 bp
Band	7|7 E3	End	104,002,569 bp
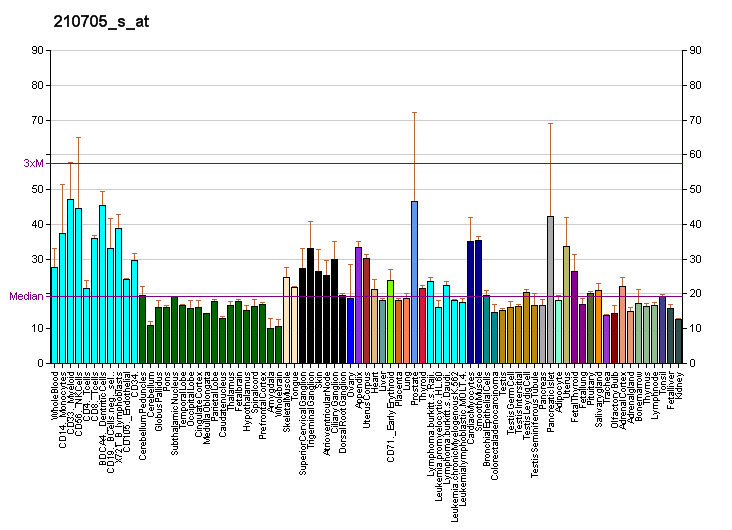
RNA expression pattern
Bgee	Human / Mouse (ortholog); Top expressed in: sural nerve; germinal epithelium; palpebral conjunctiva; stromal cell of endometrium; body of pancreas; seminal vesicula; monocyte; Descending thoracic aorta; visceral pleura; blood / Top expressed in: granulocyte; thymus; female urethra; duodenum; bone marrow; aortic valve; spleen; ascending aorta; esophagus; mesenteric lymph nodes; More reference expression data
BioGPS	More reference expression data
Gene ontology
Molecular function	protein-macromolecule adaptor activity; protein homodimerization activity; pattern recognition receptor activity; zinc ion binding; metal ion binding; protein binding; identical protein binding; protein kinase binding; transferase activity; ubiquitin-protein transferase activity
Cellular component	cytoplasm; cytosol; omegasome; intracellular anatomical structure; nucleus; P-body
Biological process	regulation of lipopolysaccharide-mediated signaling pathway; interferon-gamma-mediated signaling pathway; protein K63-linked ubiquitination; immune system process; protein trimerization; positive regulation of DNA-binding transcription factor activity; regulation of protein localization; autophagy; positive regulation of NF-kappaB transcription factor activity; defense response to virus; protein ubiquitination; activation of innate immune response; positive regulation of I-kappaB kinase/NF-kappaB signaling; innate immune response; viral process; positive regulation of MAPK cascade; pattern recognition receptor signaling pathway; negative regulation of viral entry into host cell
Sources:Amigo / QuickGO
Orthologs
Databases	NCBI: entry; OMA: entry
Species	Human	Mouse
Entrez	85363	319236
Ensembl	ENSG00000132256	ENSMUSG00000057143
UniProt	Q9C035	D3Z3L3
RefSeq (mRNA)	NM_033034; NM_033092; NM_033093	NM_001146007; NM_175677
RefSeq (protein)	NP_149023; NP_149083; NP_149084	NP_001139479; NP_783608
Location (UCSC)	Chr 11: 5.66 – 5.94 Mb	Chr 7: 103.99 – 104 Mb
PubMed search
- Wikidata
View/Edit Human	View/Edit Mouse

Tripartite motif-containing protein 5 also known as RING finger protein 88 is a protein that in humans is encoded by the TRIM5 gene. The alpha isoform of this protein, TRIM5α, is a retrovirus restriction factor, which mediates a species-specific early block to retrovirus infection.

TRIM5α is composed of 493 amino acids which is found in the cells of most primates. TRIM5α is an intrinsic immune factor important in the innate immune defense against retroviruses, along with the APOBEC family of proteins, tetherin and TRIM22.

== Structure ==
TRIM5α belongs to the TRIM protein family (TRIM stands for TRIpartite Motif); this family was first identified by Reddy in 1992 as a set of proteins which contain a RING type zinc finger domain, a B-box zinc binding domain, followed by a coiled-coil region. TRIM5α bears the C-terminal PRY-SPRY or B30.2 domain in addition to the other domains.

== Function ==
TRIM5α is a cytosolic protein that recognizes specific motifs on incoming viral capsids. Upon recognition, TRIM5α assembles into a hexagonal lattice that coats the capsid surface in a highly regular, tessellated manner. Each hexagon in this lattice is formed by interactions between trimeric hub-and-spoke structures. This coating disrupts the normal uncoating process, thereby (1) blocking nuclear import of the viral genome and (2) interfering with reverse transcription of viral RNA into DNA, which is required for integration into the host genome and subsequent viral gene expression.

While the full mechanism remains incompletely understood, it is known that TRIM5α promotes proteasome-dependent degradation of capsid proteins from restricted viruses. This process involves the recruitment of ubiquitin by the TRIM5α lattice, which subsequently targets the capsid for degradation by the proteasome. Additional host proteins may participate in TRIM5α-mediated restriction, though definitive evidence is still lacking. One known cofactor is Cyclophilin A, which is required for TRIM5α-mediated HIV-1 inhibition in Old World monkey cells. The specificity of TRIM5α-mediated restriction—that is, which retroviruses are targeted—is determined by the amino acid sequence of its C-terminal domain, known as the B30.2 or PRY-SPRY domain. Within this domain, amino acid residue 332 plays a particularly important role in determining which retroviruses are restricted.

When a retrovirus enters the host cell cytosol, its capsid was once thought to undergo complete uncoating immediately. However, this model is now considered oversimplified. Current understanding suggests that uncoating is a progressive process that begins in the cytosol and continues as the capsid approaches the nucleus, with final disassembly typically—but not always—occurring within the nucleus. Reverse transcription of the viral genome also occurs within the intact or partially uncoated capsid, producing viral DNA necessary for the formation of daughter virions.

== Clinical significance ==
=== PtERV1 resistance ===
TRIM5α may have played a critical role in the human immune defense system about 4 million years ago, when the retrovirus PtERV1 was infecting the ancestors of modern chimpanzees. While no trace of PtERV1 has yet been found in the human genome, about 130 traces of PtERV1 DNA have been found in the genome of modern chimpanzees. After recreating part of the PtERV1 retrovirus, it was reported that TRIM5α prevents the virus from entering human cells in vitro. While this cellular defense mechanism may have been very useful 4 million years ago when facing a PtERV1 epidemic, it has the side effect of leaving cells more susceptible to attack by the HIV-1 retrovirus. Recently, doubt has been cast over these conclusions. By using a PtERV1 capsid, which produces higher titer virus-like particles, Perez-Caballero et al. reported that PtERV1 is not restricted by either human or chimpanzee TRIM5α.

=== HIV-1 resistance ===
Rhesus macaques, a species of Old World monkeys, are almost completely resistant to HIV-1, the virus that causes AIDS in humans. This resistance is due to a version of the antiviral protein TRIM5α that binds the HIV-1 capsid with high affinity and rapidly induces its degradation, effectively neutralizing the virus.

Humans also express TRIM5α, but the human variant is not sufficiently adapted to block HIV-1 effectively. However, it can restrict other retroviruses, including certain strains of murine leukemia virus (MLV) and equine infectious anemia virus (EIAV). Before TRIM5α was identified as the underlying restriction factor, this antiviral activity had been observed and termed Ref1 in human cells and Lv1 in monkey cells. These terms are now largely obsolete.

A related protein, known as TRIMCyp (or TRIM5-CypA), was discovered in the owl monkey, a species of New World monkey. This fusion protein potently inhibits HIV-1 infection. A similar TRIMCyp protein has independently evolved in several species of Old World monkeys, including various macaques.

More recently, it has been shown that stimulation with interferon-α can activate the immunoproteasome, enabling human TRIM5α to effectively block HIV-1 by interfering with capsid-dependent DNA synthesis and infection.

== See also ==
- Peptidylprolyl isomerase A
