= Mulibrey nanism =

- Other names: Perheentupa syndrome and Pericardial constriction with growth failure
- Mulibrey nanism has an autosomal recessive pattern of inheritance.
- Specialty: Rheumatology, medical genetics
- Symptoms: Infertility
- Causes: Mutation of the TRIM37 gene
- Diagnostic method: Genetic testing
- Differential diagnosis: Silver-Russell syndrome
- Treatment: Growth hormone treatment, Regular pelvic exams

Mulibrey nanism ("MUscle-LIver-BRain-EYe nanism") is a rare autosomal recessive congenital disorder. It causes severe growth failure along with abnormalities of the heart, muscle, liver, brain and eye. TRIM37 is responsible for various cellular functions including developmental patterning.

== Signs and symptoms ==
An individual with Mulibrey nanism has growth retardation, a short broad neck, misshapen sternum, small thorax, square shoulders, enlarged liver, and yellowish dots in the ocular fundi. Individuals with Mulibrey nanism have also been reported to have intellectual disability, tumors, and infertility.

== Genetics ==
Chr 17

Mulibrey nanism is caused by mutations of the TRIM37 gene, located at human chromosome 17q22-23. The disorder is inherited in an autosomal recessive manner. This means the defective gene responsible for the disorder is located on an autosome (chromosome 17 is an autosome), and two copies of the defective gene (one inherited from each parent) are required in order to be born with the disorder. The parents of an individual with an autosomal recessive disorder both carry one copy of the defective gene, but usually do not experience any symptoms of the disorder.

== Diagnosis ==
The diagnosis of Mulibrey nanism can be done via genetic testing, as well as by the physical characteristics (signs/symptoms) displayed by the individual.

== Treatment ==
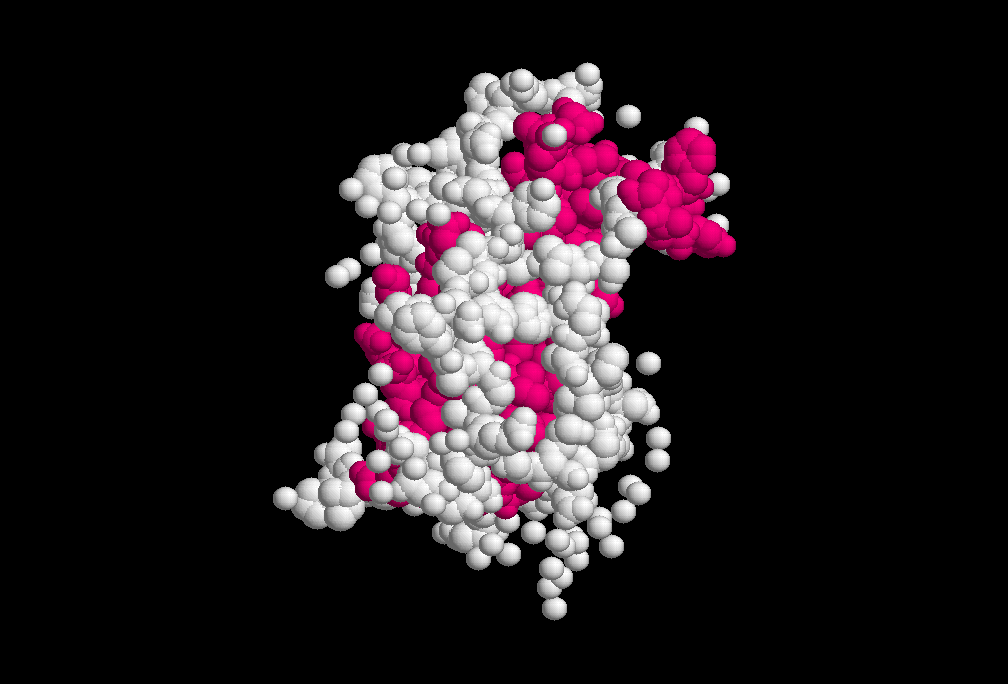
Growth hormone

In terms of treatment/management for those with Mulibrey nanism should have routine medical follow-ups, additionally the following can be done:

- Growth hormone treatment
- Regular pelvic exams
- Pericardiectomy

== Prevalence ==
Worldwide, it has been documented in 110 persons, 85 of them Finnish. It is a recessive genetic disease. Many people with Mulibrey nanism have parents who are closely related, consanguine. Signs and symptoms are variable: siblings who suffer this disease sometimes do not share the same symptoms.

== See also ==
- Wilms' tumour
