= TRIM22 =

Protein-coding gene in the species Homo sapiens

Identifiers
- Aliases: TRIM22, GPSTAF50, RNF94, STAF50, tripartite motif containing 22
- External IDs: OMIM: 606559; GeneCards: TRIM22
Enzyme activity
EC #	BRENDA	ExPASy	KEGG	MetaCyc
2.3.2.27	↗	↗	↗	↗

Gene location (Human)
Chr.	Chromosome 11 (human)
Band	11p15.4	Start	5,689,697 bp
Band	11p15.4	End	5,737,089 bp
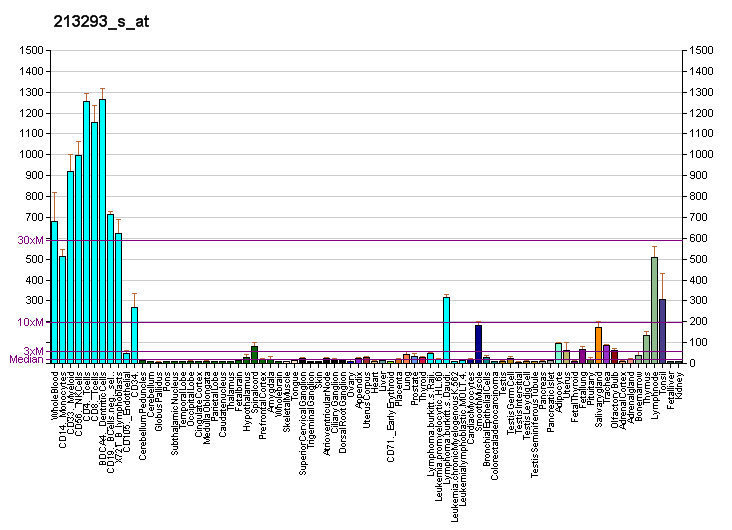
RNA expression pattern
Bgee	Human / Mouse (ortholog); Top expressed in: monocyte; spleen; lymph node; Achilles tendon; granulocyte; gallbladder; palpebral conjunctiva; appendix; right uterine tube; blood / n/a; More reference expression data
BioGPS	More reference expression data
Gene ontology
Molecular function	protein-macromolecule adaptor activity; transcription corepressor activity; DNA-binding transcription factor activity; zinc ion binding; metal ion binding; protein binding; protein kinase binding; transferase activity
Cellular component	cytoplasm; cytosol; Cajal body; nuclear speck; intracellular anatomical structure; nucleoplasm; nucleus; nuclear body; Golgi apparatus
Biological process	regulation of transcription, DNA-templated; positive regulation of autophagy; interferon-gamma-mediated signaling pathway; protein trimerization; response to virus; positive regulation of DNA-binding transcription factor activity; transcription, DNA-templated; regulation of protein localization; positive regulation of NF-kappaB transcription factor activity; defense response to virus; protein ubiquitination; immune response; positive regulation of I-kappaB kinase/NF-kappaB signaling; viral process; negative regulation of nucleic acid-templated transcription
Sources:Amigo / QuickGO
Orthologs
Databases	NCBI: entry; OMA: entry
Species	Human	Mouse
Entrez	10346	n/a
Ensembl	ENSG00000132274	n/a
UniProt	Q8IYM9	n/a
RefSeq (mRNA)	NM_006074; NM_001199573	n/a
RefSeq (protein)	NP_001186502; NP_006065	n/a
Location (UCSC)	Chr 11: 5.69 – 5.74 Mb	n/a
PubMed search		n/a
- Wikidata
View/Edit Human

Tripartite motif-containing 22, also known as TRIM22, is a protein which in humans is encoded by the TRIM22 gene.

== Function ==
The protein encoded by this gene is a member of the tripartite motif (TRIM) family. The TRIM motif includes three zinc-binding domains, a RING, a B-box type 1 and a B-box type 2, and a coiled-coil region. This protein localizes to the cytoplasm and its expression is induced by interferon. TRIM22 is also a target gene of the tumor suppressor protein p53.

TRIM22 possesses E3 ubiquitin ligase activity and is able to ubiquitinate itself with the assistance of the E2 enzyme UbcH5B. Furthermore, TRIM22 is located in the nucleus and therefore may function as a nuclear E3 ubiquitin ligase.

== Clinical significance ==
The protein down-regulates transcription from the HIV-1 long terminal repeat promoter region, suggesting that function of this protein may be to mediate interferon's antiviral effects. Other proteins that function to restrict HIV replication include TRIM5alpha and APOBEC3G.

It has been demonstrated that treatment of cells with interferon type I inhibits HIV replication and TRIM22 is strongly up-regulated by interferon treatment. Furthermore, HIV particle release from cells depleted of TRIM22 with RNA interference is enhanced. TRIM22 appears to prevent the movement of the HIV Gag protein to the plasma membrane and hence TRIM22 can block HIV replication in cell cultures by preventing the assembly of the virus.
