= TRIM62 =

Protein-coding gene found in humans

Identifiers
- Aliases: TRIM62, DEAR1, tripartite motif containing 62
- External IDs: OMIM: 616755; MGI: 1914775; GeneCards: TRIM62
Enzyme activity
EC #	BRENDA	ExPASy	KEGG	MetaCyc
2.3.2.27	↗	↗	↗	↗

Gene location (Human)
Chr.	Chromosome 1 (human)
Band	1p35.1	Start	33,145,399 bp
Band	1p35.1	End	33,182,059 bp

Gene location (Mouse)
Chr.	Chromosome 4 (mouse)
Band	4|4 D2.2	Start	128,777,373 bp
Band	4|4 D2.2	End	128,805,121 bp
RNA expression pattern
Bgee	Human / Mouse (ortholog); Top expressed in: oocyte; secondary oocyte; gonad; parotid gland; granulocyte; testicle; right hemisphere of cerebellum; skin of leg; pars reticulata; skin of abdomen / Top expressed in: cerebellar cortex; lobe of cerebellum; cerebellar vermis; saccule; Gonadal ridge; habenula; otic vesicle; transitional epithelium of urinary bladder; lumbar spinal ganglion; genital tubercle; More reference expression data
BioGPS	n/a
Gene ontology
Molecular function	zinc ion binding; metal ion binding; ubiquitin-protein transferase activity; transferase activity
Cellular component	cytoplasm; cytosol; intracellular anatomical structure
Biological process	positive regulation of I-kappaB kinase/NF-kappaB signaling; positive regulation of DNA-binding transcription factor activity; innate immune response; positive regulation of NF-kappaB transcription factor activity; protein ubiquitination; negative regulation of epithelial to mesenchymal transition; interferon-gamma-mediated signaling pathway; negative regulation of viral transcription; regulation of viral entry into host cell
Sources:Amigo / QuickGO
Orthologs
Databases	NCBI: entry; OMA: entry
Species	Human	Mouse
Entrez	55223	67525
Ensembl	ENSG00000116525	ENSMUSG00000041000
UniProt	Q9BVG3	Q80V85
RefSeq (mRNA)	NM_018207; NM_001330483	NM_178110; NM_001370756; NM_001370757
RefSeq (protein)	NP_001317412; NP_060677	NP_835211; NP_001357685; NP_001357686
Location (UCSC)	Chr 1: 33.15 – 33.18 Mb	Chr 4: 128.78 – 128.81 Mb
PubMed search
- Wikidata
View/Edit Human	View/Edit Mouse

TRIM62, also called DEAR1 (for ductal epithelium–associated RING chromosome 1), is a protein in the tripartite motif family. In human it is encoded by the gene TRIM62. TRIM62 is involved in the morphogenesis of the mammary gland, and loss of TRIM62 gene expression in breast is associated with a higher risk of recurrence in early-onset breast cancer.
