= Zinc finger C2HC-type containing 1B =

Protein-coding gene in the species Homo sapiens

ZC2HC1B

Identifiers
- Aliases: ZC2HC1B, C6orf94, FAM164B, dJ468K18.5, zinc finger C2HC-type containing 1B
- External IDs: MGI: 1922372; GeneCards: ZC2HC1B

Gene location (Human)
Chr.	Chromosome 6 (human)
Band	6q24.2	Start	143,864,436 bp
Band	6q24.2	End	143,938,343 bp

Gene location (Mouse)
Chr.	Chromosome 10 (mouse)
Band	10|10 A2	Start	13,025,284 bp
Band	10|10 A2	End	13,053,767 bp
RNA expression pattern
Bgee	Human / Mouse (ortholog); Top expressed in: testicle; left testis; right testis; placenta; ventricular zone; skeletal muscle tissue; appendix; Achilles tendon; endometrium; muscle of thigh / Top expressed in: gastrula; epithelium of small intestine; seminiferous tubule; pineal gland; embryo; paraventricular nucleus of hypothalamus; ventral tegmental area; lobe of cerebellum; habenula; body of femur; More reference expression data
BioGPS	n/a
Orthologs
Databases	NCBI: entry; OMA: entry
Species	Human	Mouse
Entrez	153918	75122
Ensembl	ENSG00000118491	ENSMUSG00000019815
UniProt	Q5TFG8	Q9D534
RefSeq (mRNA)	NM_001013623	NM_029172
RefSeq (protein)	NP_001013645	NP_083448
Location (UCSC)	Chr 6: 143.86 – 143.94 Mb	Chr 10: 13.03 – 13.05 Mb
PubMed search
- Wikidata
View/Edit Human	View/Edit Mouse

Zinc finger C2HC-type containing 1B is a protein that in humans is encoded by the ZC2HC1B gene.
