= TRIM69 =

Protein-coding gene in the species Homo sapiens

Identifiers
- Aliases: TRIM69, HSD-34, HSD34, RNF36, Trif, tripartite motif containing 69
- External IDs: OMIM: 616017; MGI: 1918178; GeneCards: TRIM69
Available structures
PDB	Ortholog search: PDBe RCSB
PDB	List of PDB id codes 4NQJ
Enzyme activity
EC #	BRENDA	ExPASy	KEGG	MetaCyc
2.3.2.27	↗	↗	↗	↗

Gene location (Human)
Chr.	Chromosome 15 (human)
Band	15q21.1	Start	44,728,988 bp
Band	15q21.1	End	44,767,829 bp

Gene location (Mouse)
Chr.	Chromosome 2 (mouse)
Band	2|2 E5	Start	121,991,181 bp
Band	2|2 E5	End	122,009,508 bp
RNA expression pattern
Bgee	Human / Mouse (ortholog); Top expressed in: granulocyte; epithelium of colon; thymus; prefrontal cortex; muscle of thigh; left testis; skeletal muscle tissue; putamen; left ventricle; caudate nucleus / Top expressed in: spermatid; spermatocyte; seminiferous tubule; embryo; embryo; blastocyst; morula; jejunum; endocrine system; pancreas; More reference expression data
BioGPS	n/a
Gene ontology
Molecular function	protein binding; metal ion binding; ubiquitin-protein transferase activity; transferase activity
Cellular component	cytoplasm; nuclear speck; nucleus; cytosol
Biological process	protein ubiquitination; apoptotic process; protein polyubiquitination
Sources:Amigo / QuickGO
Orthologs
Databases	NCBI: entry; OMA: entry
Species	Human	Mouse
Entrez	140691	70928
Ensembl	ENSG00000278211; ENSG00000185880	ENSMUSG00000033368
UniProt	Q86WT6	Q80X56
RefSeq (mRNA)	NM_182985; NM_001301144; NM_001301145; NM_001301146; NM_080745	NM_080510; NM_001379369
RefSeq (protein)	NP_001288073; NP_001288074; NP_001288075; NP_542783; NP_892030	NP_536771; NP_001366298
Location (UCSC)	Chr 15: 44.73 – 44.77 Mb	Chr 2: 121.99 – 122.01 Mb
PubMed search
- Wikidata
View/Edit Human	View/Edit Mouse

Tripartite motif containing 69 is a protein that in humans is encoded by the TRIM69 gene.

== Function ==
This gene encodes a member of the RING-B-box-coiled-coil (RBCC) family and encodes a protein with an N-terminal RING finger motif, a PRY domain and a C-terminal SPRY domain. The mouse ortholog of this gene is specifically expressed in germ cells at the round spermatid stages during spermatogenesis and, when overexpressed, induces apoptosis. Alternatively spliced transcript variants encoding distinct isoforms have been described.
