= TRIM23 =

Protein-coding gene in the species Homo sapiens

Identifiers
- Aliases: TRIM23, ARD1, ARFD1, RNF46, tripartite motif containing 23
- External IDs: OMIM: 601747; MGI: 1933161; GeneCards: TRIM23
Enzyme activity
EC #	BRENDA	ExPASy	KEGG	MetaCyc
2.3.2.27	↗	↗	↗	↗

Gene location (Human)
Chr.	Chromosome 5 (human)
Band	5q12.3	Start	65,589,690 bp
Band	5q12.3	End	65,625,975 bp

Gene location (Mouse)
Chr.	Chromosome 13 (mouse)
Band	13|13 D1	Start	104,315,305 bp
Band	13|13 D1	End	104,339,880 bp
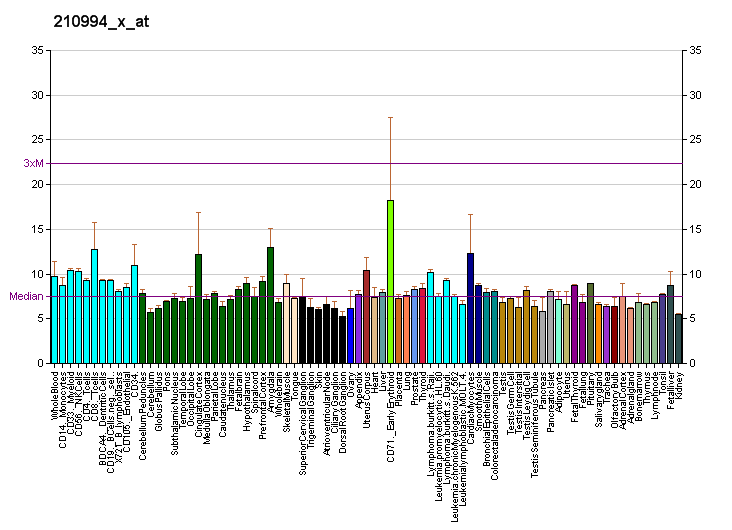

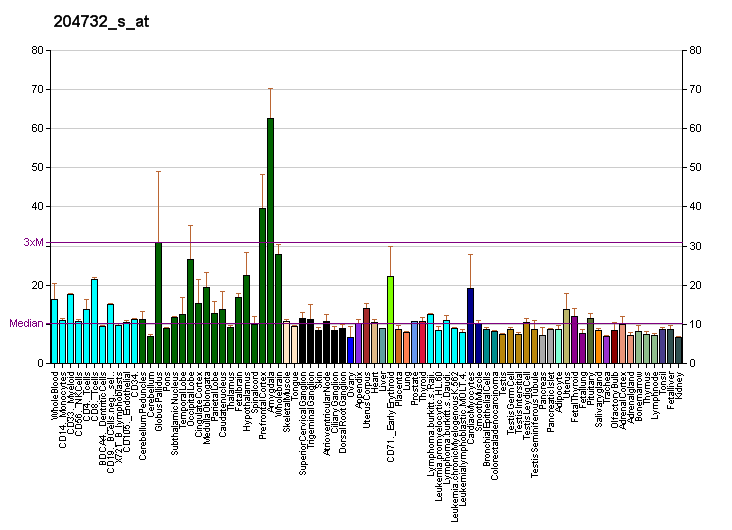

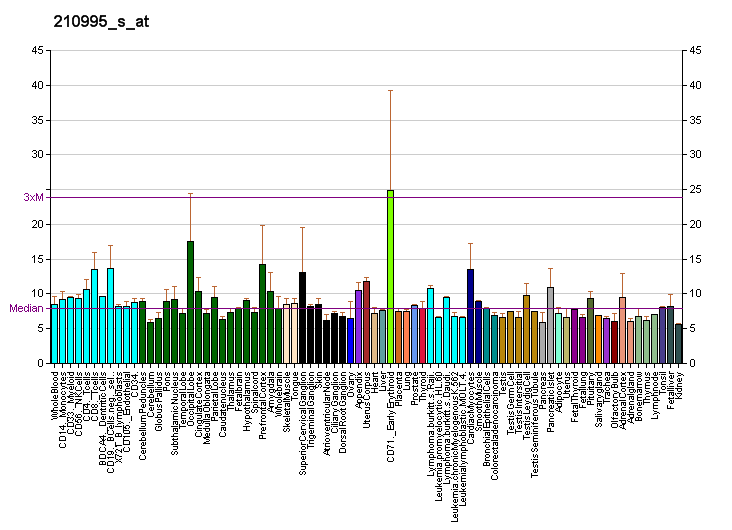
RNA expression pattern
Bgee	Human / Mouse (ortholog); Top expressed in: cerebellar vermis; frontal pole; Achilles tendon; corpus callosum; prefrontal cortex; Brodmann area 10; inferior ganglion of vagus nerve; lateral nuclear group of thalamus; pars compacta; ventricular zone / Top expressed in: spermatocyte; lobe of cerebellum; amygdala; dentate gyrus of hippocampal formation granule cell; intercostal muscle; lateral septal nucleus; mammillary body; triceps brachii muscle; superior frontal gyrus; hippocampus proper; More reference expression data
BioGPS	More reference expression data
Gene ontology
Molecular function	enzyme activator activity; identical protein binding; GTPase activity; ubiquitin-protein transferase activity; protein binding; GDP binding; zinc ion binding; metal ion binding; nucleotide binding; GTP binding; transferase activity; nucleic acid binding
Cellular component	endomembrane system; Golgi membrane; nucleus; lysosomal membrane; intracellular anatomical structure; membrane; lysosome; cytoplasm; Golgi apparatus; plasma membrane
Biological process	protein ubiquitination; viral process; positive regulation of catalytic activity; immune system process; innate immune response; intracellular protein transport; Golgi to plasma membrane transport; vesicle-mediated transport
Sources:Amigo / QuickGO
Orthologs
Databases	NCBI: entry; OMA: entry
Species	Human	Mouse
Entrez	373	81003
Ensembl	ENSG00000113595	ENSMUSG00000021712
UniProt	P36406	Q8BGX0
RefSeq (mRNA)	NM_001656; NM_033227; NM_033228	NM_030731; NM_001361538; NM_001361539
RefSeq (protein)	NP_001647; NP_150230; NP_150231	NP_001348467; NP_001348468
Location (UCSC)	Chr 5: 65.59 – 65.63 Mb	Chr 13: 104.32 – 104.34 Mb
PubMed search
- Wikidata
View/Edit Human	View/Edit Mouse

GTP-binding protein ARD-1 is a protein that in humans is encoded by the TRIM23 gene.

== Function ==
The protein encoded by this gene is a member of the tripartite motif (TRIM) family. The TRIM motif includes three zinc-binding domains, a RING, a B-box type 1 and a B-box type 2, and a coiled-coil region. This protein is also a member of the ADP ribosylation factor family of guanine nucleotide-binding family of proteins. Its carboxy terminus contains an ADP-ribosylation factor domain and a guanine nucleotide binding site, while the amino terminus contains a GTPase activating protein domain which acts on the guanine nucleotide binding site. The protein localizes to lysosomes and the Golgi apparatus. It plays a role in the formation of intracellular transport vesicles, their movement from one compartment to another, and phospholipase D activation. Three alternatively spliced transcript variants for this gene have been described.

== Interactions ==
TRIM23 has been shown to interact with TRIM31, TRIM29 and PSCD1.
