= TRIM31 =

Protein-coding gene in the species Homo sapiens

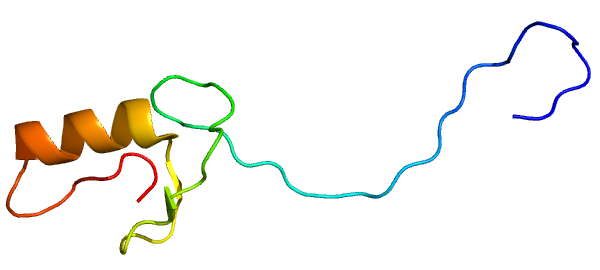

Identifiers
- Aliases: TRIM31, C6orf13, HCG1, HCGI, RNF, tripartite motif containing 31
- External IDs: OMIM: 609316; MGI: 2385051; GeneCards: TRIM31
Available structures
PDB	Ortholog search: PDBe RCSB
PDB	List of PDB id codes 2YSJ, 2YSL
Enzyme activity
EC #	BRENDA	ExPASy	KEGG	MetaCyc
2.3.2.27	↗	↗	↗	↗

Gene location (Human)
Chr.	Chromosome 6 (human)
Band	6p22.1	Start	30,102,897 bp
Band	6p22.1	End	30,113,090 bp

Gene location (Mouse)
Chr.	Chromosome 17 (mouse)
Band	17|17 B1	Start	37,209,010 bp
Band	17|17 B1	End	37,221,106 bp
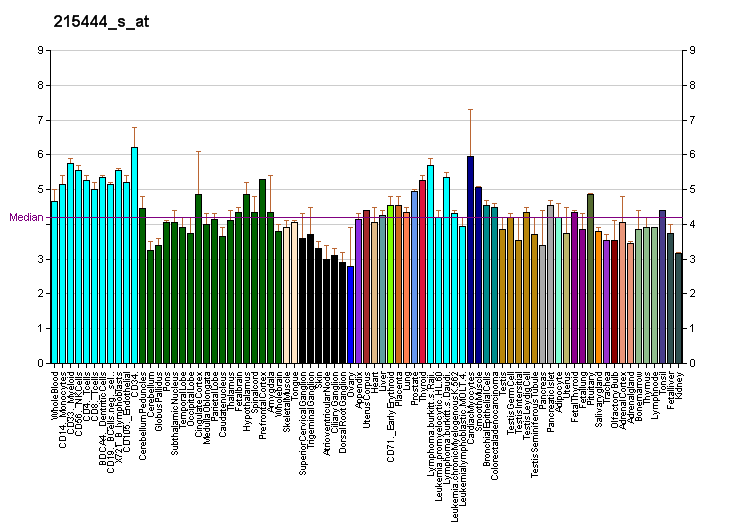

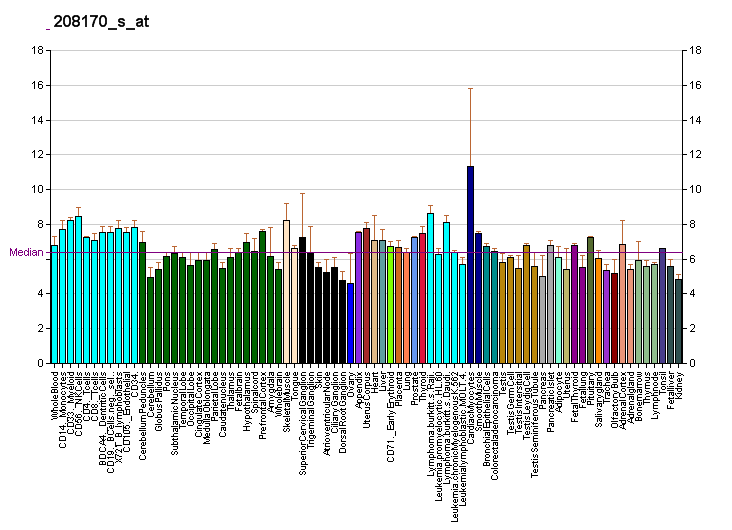

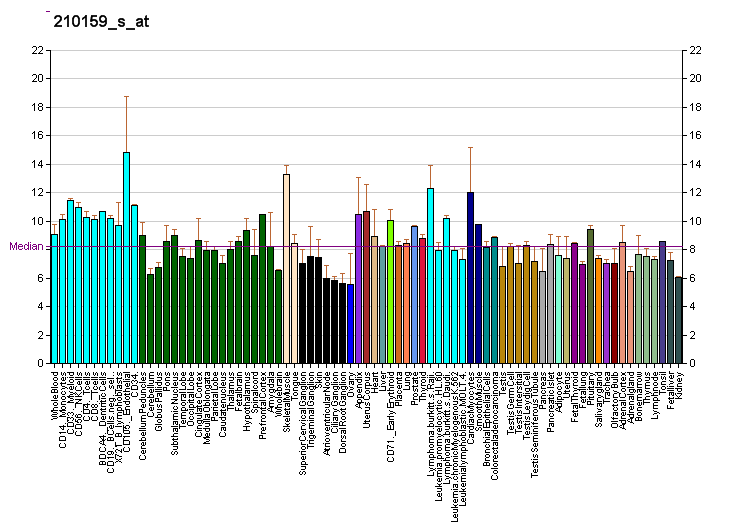
RNA expression pattern
Bgee	Human / Mouse (ortholog); Top expressed in: mucosa of transverse colon; rectum; duodenum; appendix; gallbladder; urinary bladder; testicle; epithelium of colon; right testis; left testis / Top expressed in: intestinal villus; jejunum; duodenum; left colon; ileum; epithelium of small intestine; Paneth cell; crypt of lieberkuhn of small intestine; migratory enteric neural crest cell; zygote; More reference expression data
BioGPS	More reference expression data
Gene ontology
Molecular function	zinc ion binding; protein binding; metal ion binding; transferase activity
Cellular component	cytoplasm; cytosol; intracellular anatomical structure; mitochondrion
Biological process	positive regulation of DNA-binding transcription factor activity; protein ubiquitination; interferon-gamma-mediated signaling pathway; negative regulation of viral transcription; innate immune response; negative regulation of viral entry into host cell
Sources:Amigo / QuickGO
Orthologs
Databases	NCBI: entry; OMA: entry
Species	Human	Mouse
Entrez	11074	224762
Ensembl	ENSG00000223531; ENSG00000137397; ENSG00000233573; ENSG00000224168; ENSG00000225130 ENSG00000226402; ENSG00000224542; ENSG00000204616	ENSMUSG00000058063
UniProt	Q9BZY9; Q2L6J1	Q8R0K2
RefSeq (mRNA)	NM_007028	NM_146077
RefSeq (protein)	NP_008959; NP_008959.3	NP_666189
Location (UCSC)	Chr 6: 30.1 – 30.11 Mb	Chr 17: 37.21 – 37.22 Mb
PubMed search
- Wikidata
View/Edit Human	View/Edit Mouse

Tripartite motif-containing protein 31 is a protein that in humans is encoded by the TRIM31 gene.

The protein encoded by this gene is a member of the tripartite motif (TRIM) family. The TRIM motif includes three zinc-binding domains, a RING, a B-box type 1 and a B-box type 2, and a coiled-coil region. The protein localizes to both the cytoplasm and the nucleus. Its function has not been identified.

== Interactions ==
TRIM31 has been shown to interact with TRIM23.
