= Zinc finger protein 875 =

Protein found in humans

ZNF875

Identifiers
- Aliases: ZNF875, HKR1, GLI-Kruppel zinc finger family member, zinc finger protein 875, HKR1
- External IDs: OMIM: 165250; GeneCards: ZNF875

Gene location (Human)
Chr.	Chromosome 19 (human)
Band	19q13.12	Start	37,312,837 bp
Band	19q13.12	End	37,369,365 bp
RNA expression pattern
Bgee	Human / Mouse (ortholog); Top expressed in: pancreatic ductal cell; endothelial cell; right uterine tube; right lobe of thyroid gland; left lobe of thyroid gland; right hemisphere of cerebellum; anterior pituitary; apex of heart; right adrenal cortex; left adrenal cortex / n/a; More reference expression data
BioGPS	n/a
Gene ontology
Molecular function	DNA binding; metal ion binding; nucleic acid binding; DNA-binding transcription factor activity, RNA polymerase II-specific
Cellular component	intracellular anatomical structure; nucleus
Biological process	multicellular organism development; regulation of transcription, DNA-templated; transcription, DNA-templated; regulation of transcription by RNA polymerase II
Sources:Amigo / QuickGO
Orthologs
Databases	NCBI: entry; OMA: entry
Species	Human	Mouse
Entrez	284459	n/a
Ensembl	ENSG00000181666	n/a
UniProt	P10072	n/a
RefSeq (mRNA)	NM_001329761; NM_001329762; NM_001329763; NM_001329764; NM_001329765 NM_001329766; NM_001329767; NM_001329768; NM_001329769; NM_001329770; NM_001329771; NM_001329772; NM_001329773; NM_001329774; NM_001329775; NM_001329776; NM_001329777; NM_001329778; NM_001329779; NM_181786; NM_001353803; NM_001353804	n/a
RefSeq (protein)	NP_001316690; NP_001316691; NP_001316692; NP_001316693; NP_001316694 NP_001316695; NP_001316696; NP_001316697; NP_001316698; NP_001316699; NP_001316700; NP_001316701; NP_001316702; NP_001316703; NP_001316704; NP_001316705; NP_001316706; NP_001316707; NP_001316708; NP_861451; NP_001340732; NP_001340733	n/a
Location (UCSC)	Chr 19: 37.31 – 37.37 Mb	n/a
PubMed search		n/a
- Wikidata
View/Edit Human

Zinc finger protein 875, also called Krueppel-related zinc finger protein 1, is a protein that in humans is encoded by the ZNF875 gene (previously HKR1).
