= TRIM9 =

Protein-coding gene in the species Homo sapiens

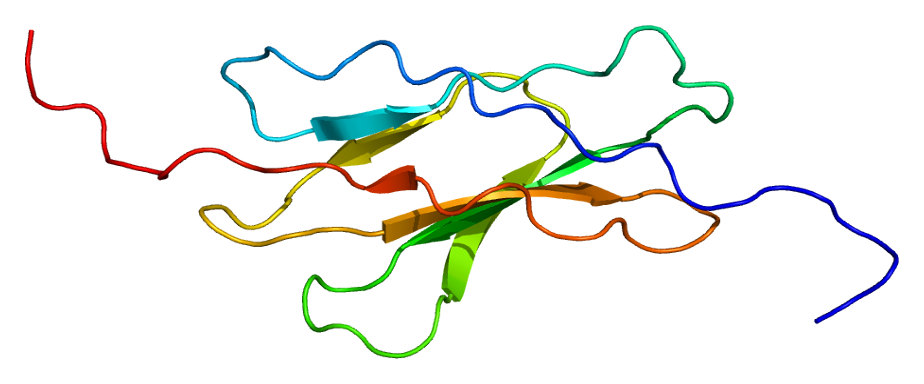

Identifiers
- Aliases: TRIM9, RNF91, SPRING, tripartite motif containing 9
- External IDs: OMIM: 606555; MGI: 2137354; GeneCards: TRIM9
Available structures
PDB	Ortholog search: PDBe RCSB
PDB	List of PDB id codes 2DB8
Enzyme activity
EC #	BRENDA	ExPASy	KEGG	MetaCyc
2.3.2.27	↗	↗	↗	↗

Gene location (Human)
Chr.	Chromosome 14 (human)
Band	14q22.1	Start	50,975,262 bp
Band	14q22.1	End	51,096,061 bp

Gene location (Mouse)
Chr.	Chromosome 12 (mouse)
Band	12|12 C2	Start	70,291,307 bp
Band	12|12 C2	End	70,394,388 bp
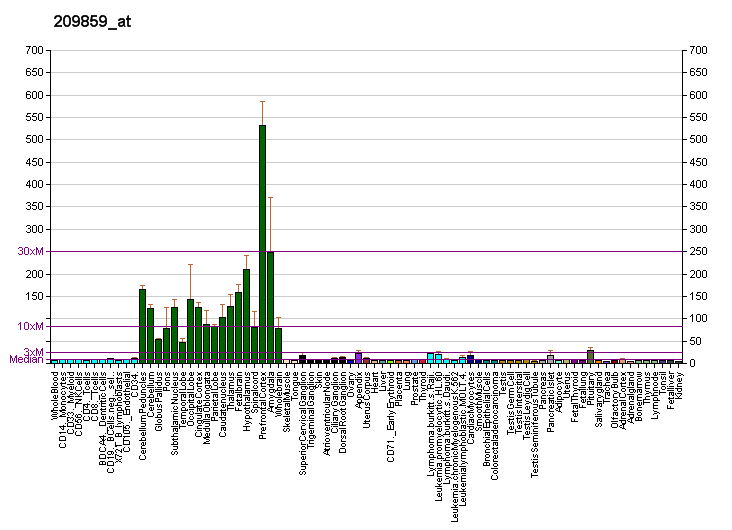
RNA expression pattern
Bgee	Human / Mouse (ortholog); Top expressed in: right hemisphere of cerebellum; right frontal lobe; Brodmann area 23; primary visual cortex; Brodmann area 9; Region I of hippocampus proper; middle temporal gyrus; ventricular zone; nucleus accumbens; caudate nucleus / Top expressed in: piriform cortex; lateral septal nucleus; Rostral migratory stream; primary motor cortex; superior frontal gyrus; subiculum; primary visual cortex; anterior amygdaloid area; olfactory tubercle; medial dorsal nucleus; More reference expression data
BioGPS	More reference expression data
Gene ontology
Molecular function	metal ion binding; zinc ion binding; protein binding; protein homodimerization activity; transferase activity; protein domain specific binding; ubiquitin-protein transferase activity; SNARE binding
Cellular component	cytoplasm; cytoplasmic vesicle; cell junction; dendrite; cell projection; synapse; cytoskeleton; synaptic vesicle; intracellular anatomical structure; cytosol; presynaptic cytosol
Biological process	negative regulation of calcium ion-dependent exocytosis; protein ubiquitination; negative regulation of SNARE complex assembly; synaptic vesicle exocytosis; proteasome-mediated ubiquitin-dependent protein catabolic process
Sources:Amigo / QuickGO
Orthologs
Databases	NCBI: entry; OMA: entry
Species	Human	Mouse
Entrez	114088	94090
Ensembl	ENSG00000100505	ENSMUSG00000021071
UniProt	Q9C026	Q8C7M3
RefSeq (mRNA)	NM_015163; NM_052978	NM_001110202; NM_001110203; NM_001286386; NM_001286387; NM_001286388 NM_053167
RefSeq (protein)	NP_055978; NP_443210	NP_001103672; NP_001103673; NP_001273315; NP_001273316; NP_001273317 NP_444397; NP_001392290; NP_001392291; NP_001392292; NP_001392293; NP_001392294; NP_001392295; NP_001392296; NP_001392297; NP_001392298; NP_001392299; NP_001392300; NP_001392301; NP_001392302; NP_001392303; NP_001392304; NP_001392305; NP_001392306; NP_001392307; NP_001392308; NP_001392309; NP_001392310; NP_001392311; NP_001392312; NP_001392313; NP_001392314; NP_001392315; NP_001392316
Location (UCSC)	Chr 14: 50.98 – 51.1 Mb	Chr 12: 70.29 – 70.39 Mb
PubMed search
- Wikidata
View/Edit Human	View/Edit Mouse

Tripartite motif-containing protein 9 is a protein that in humans is encoded by the TRIM9 gene.

The protein encoded by this gene is a member of the tripartite motif (TRIM) family. The TRIM motif includes three zinc-binding domains, a RING, a B-box type 1 and a B-box type 2, and a coiled-coil region. The protein localizes to cytoplasmic bodies. Its function has not been identified. Alternate splicing of this gene generates two transcript variants encoding different isoforms.

== Interactions ==
TRIM9 has been shown to interact with SNAP-25.
