= B-box zinc finger domain =

zf-B_box
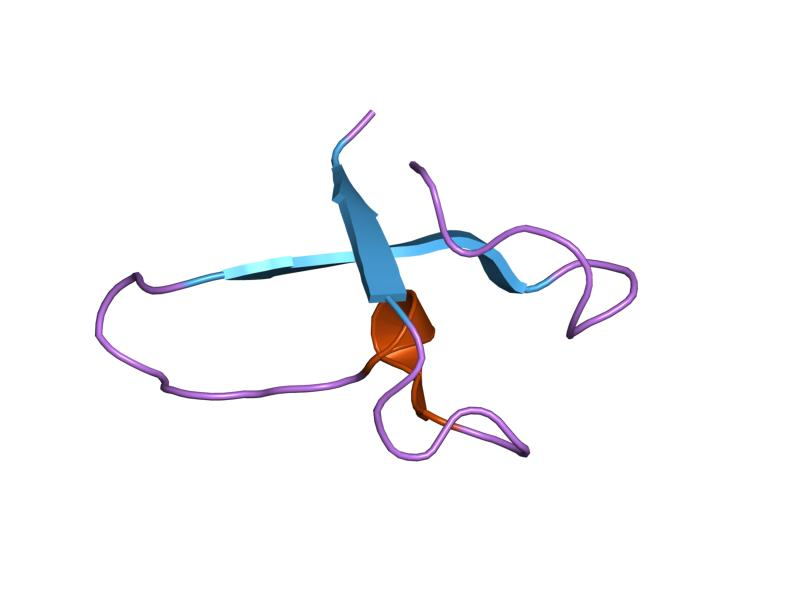
- Structure of the xnf7 B-box, developmental protein

Identifiers
- Symbol: zf-B_box
- Pfam: PF00643
- InterPro: IPR000315
- PROSITE: PDOC50015
- SCOP2: 1fre / SCOPe / SUPFAM
- CDD: cd00021
Available protein structures:
- PDB: IPR000315 PF00643 (ECOD; PDBsum)
- AlphaFold: IPR000315; PF00643

In molecular biology the B-box-type zinc finger domain is a short protein domain of around 40 amino acid residues in length. B-box zinc fingers can be divided into two groups, where types 1 and 2 B-box domains differ in their consensus sequence and in the spacing of the 7-8 zinc-binding residues. Several proteins contain both types 1 and 2 B-boxes, suggesting some level of cooperativity between these two domains.

== Occurrence ==
B-box domains are found in over 1500 proteins from a variety of organisms. They are found in TRIM (tripartite motif) proteins that consist of an N-terminal RING finger (originally called an A-box), followed by 1-2 B-box domains and a coiled-coil domain (also called RBCC for Ring, B-box, Coiled-Coil). TRIM proteins contain a type 2 B-box domain, and may also contain a type 1 B-box. In proteins that do not contain RING or coiled-coil domains, the B-box domain is primarily type 2. Many type 2 B-box proteins are involved in ubiquitinylation. Proteins containing a B-box zinc finger domain include transcription factors, ribonucleoproteins and proto-oncoproteins; for example, MID1, MID2, TRIM9, TNL, TRIM36, TRIM63, TRIFIC, NCL1 and CONSTANS-like proteins.

The microtubule-associated E3 ligase MID1 (EC) contains a type 1 B-box zinc finger domain. MID1 specifically binds Alpha-4, which in turn recruits the catalytic subunit of phosphatase 2A (PP2Ac). This complex is required for targeting of PP2Ac for proteasome-mediated degradation. The MID1 B-box coordinates two zinc ions and adopts a beta/beta/alpha cross-brace structure similar to that of ZZ, PHD, RING and FYVE zinc fingers.

== Homologs ==
Prokaryotic homologs of the domain are present in several bacterial lineages and methanogenic archaea, and often show fusions to peptidase domains such as the rhomboid-like serine peptidase, and Zn-dependent metallopeptidase. Other versions typically contain transmembrane helices and might also show fusions to domains such as DNAJ, FHA, SH3, WD40 and tetratricopeptide repeats. Together these associations suggest a role for the prokaryotic homologs of the B-box zinc finger domain in proteolytic processing, folding or stability of membrane-associated proteins. The domain architectural syntax is remarkably similar to that seen in prokaryotic homologs of the AN1 zinc finger and LIM domains.

== See also ==
- Zinc finger
This article incorporates text from the public domain Pfam and InterPro: IPR000315
