= C10orf53 =

Human gene

Identifiers
- Aliases: C10orf53, chromosome 10 open reading frame 53
- External IDs: MGI: 1914335; GeneCards: C10orf53

Gene location (Human)
Chr.	Chromosome 10 (human)
Band	10q11.23	Start	49,679,651 bp
Band	10q11.23	End	49,710,261 bp

Gene location (Mouse)
Chr.	Chromosome 14 (mouse)
Band	14|14 B	Start	32,098,025 bp
Band	14|14 B	End	32,110,348 bp
RNA expression pattern
Bgee	Human / Mouse (ortholog); Top expressed in: sperm; left testis; right testis; testicle; right uterine tube; face; mucosa of nose; hypothalamus; olfactory zone of nasal mucosa; hippocampal formation / Top expressed in: spermatid; testicle; embryo; embryo; ovary; hypothalamus; spermatocyte; embryonic organizer; pharynx; nasopharynx; More reference expression data
BioGPS	n/a
Orthologs
Databases	NCBI: entry; OMA: entry
Species	Human	Mouse
Entrez	282966	67085
Ensembl	ENSG00000178645	ENSMUSG00000072473
UniProt	Q8N6V4	Q3KNL4
RefSeq (mRNA)	NM_182554; NM_001042427	NM_001034037
RefSeq (protein)	NP_001035892; NP_872360	NP_001029209
Location (UCSC)	Chr 10: 49.68 – 49.71 Mb	Chr 14: 32.1 – 32.11 Mb
PubMed search
- Wikidata
View/Edit Human	View/Edit Mouse

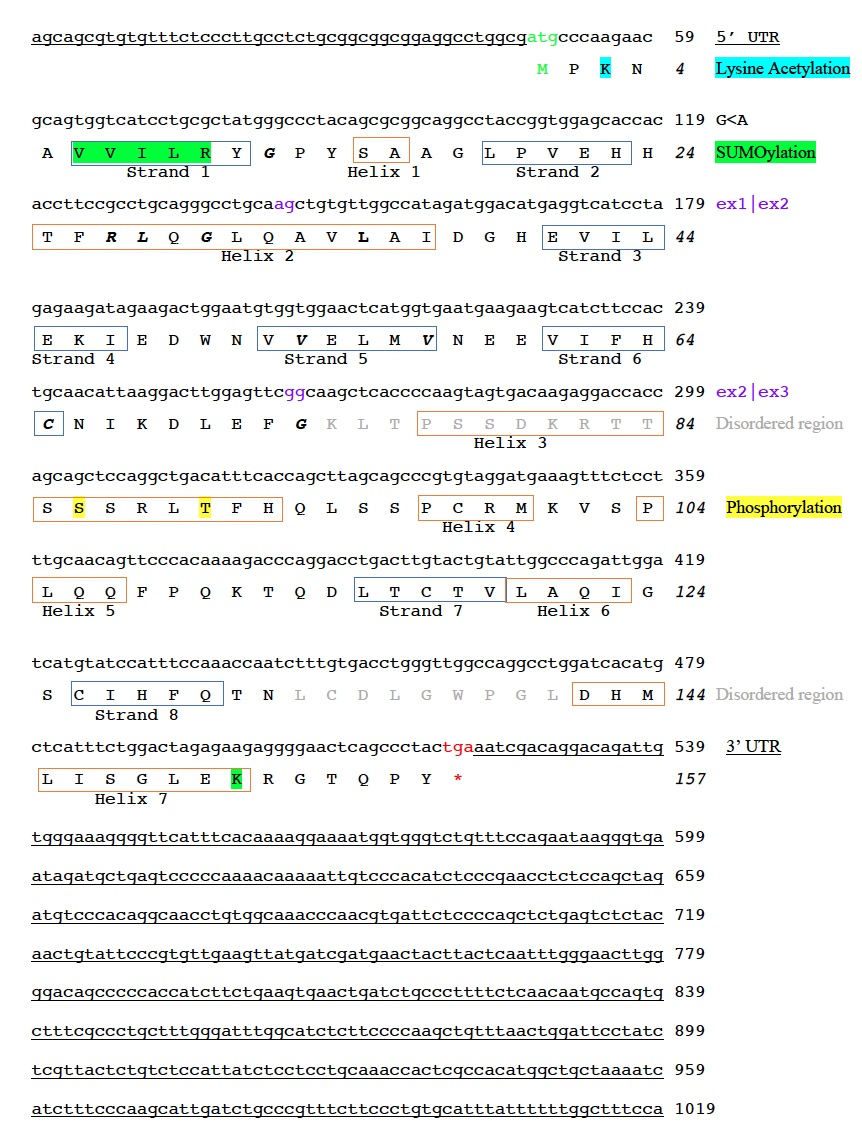
Conceptual translation of C10orf53. The full nucleotide and amino acid sequence are shown and aligned to show the relationship between the sequences. Information regarding post translation modifications, exon boundaries, untranslated regions, and disordered regions are emphasized in the translation.

C10orf53 is a protein that in humans is encoded by the C10orf53 gene. The gene is located on the positive strand of the DNA and is 30,611 nucleotides in length. The protein is 157 amino acids and the gene has 3 exons. C10orf53 orthologs are found in mammals, birds, reptiles, amphibians, fish, and invertebrates. It is primarily expressed in the testes and at very low levels in the cerebellum, liver, placenta, and trachea.

== Gene ==
Chromosome 10 open reading frame 53 (10orf53), also known as uncharacterized protein family 0728 (UPF0728), in humans, is encoded by Chromosome 10 (10q11.23), spanning 30,611 nucleotides. The gene is located on the positive strand with 3 identified exons.

== Transcript ==
Isoform	Accession #	Length (amino acids)	Length (nucleotides)	Exons translated	Additional comments
a	NM_182554.4 NP_872360.2	157	30,611	3	Less common isoform
b	NM_001042427.3 NP_001035892.1	93	17,882	3	More common isoform – alternative 3’ exon and distinct C-terminus

The table outlines the two identified isoforms of C10orf53. The most common isoform has 93 amino acids which is a shorter amino acid sequence due to an alternative 3’ terminal exon and distinct C-terminus. Isoform A has a higher frequency of analysis due to it being the longer isoform. The analysis in this article is focused on isoform A.

== Structure ==
The molecular weight predicted was 17.6 kDa. The isoelectric point for C10orf53 is estimated to be 6.36 pl

=== Secondary ===
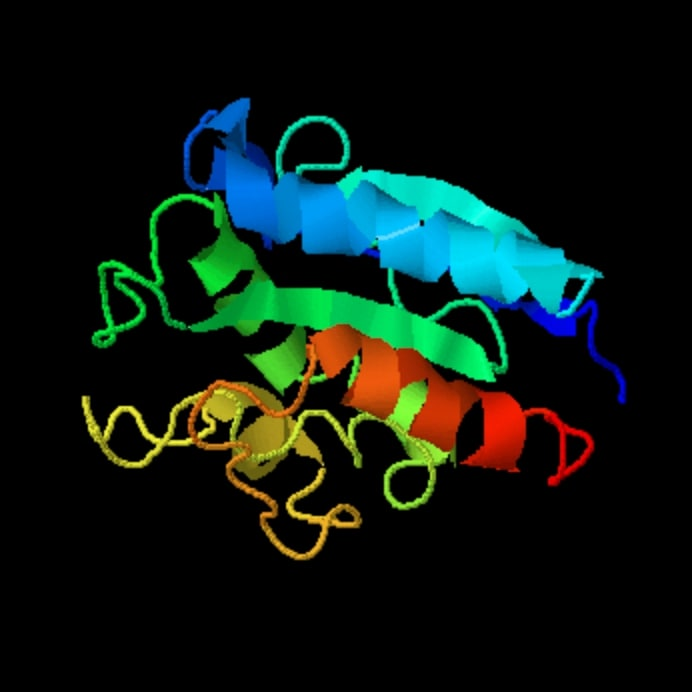
Predicted tertiary structure through I-TASSER. This is a predicted visual representation of the secondary structure including alpha-helices and beta-pleated sheets.

MPKNAVVILRYGPYSAAGLPVEHHTFRLQGLQAVLAIDGHEVILEKIEDWNVVELMVNEEVIFHCNI         67

CCCCCSSSSSSCCCHHCCSSSSSCHHHHHHHHHHHHHCCCSSSSSSSCCCCSSSSSSCCCSSSSSCC         67

KDLEFGKLTPSSDKRTTSSSRLTFHQLSSPCRMKVSPLQQFPQKTQDLTCTVLAQIGSCIHFQTNLC         134

CCCCCCCCCHHHHHHHHHHHHHHHHCCCCHHHHCCCHHHHCCCCCCCSSSSSHHHHCCSSSSSCCCC         134

DLGWPGLDHMLISGLEKRGTQPY                                                     157

CCCCCCCHHHHHHHHHHCCCCCC                                                     157

The secondary structure above illustrates the estimated secondary structure for Isoform A of C10orf53. The C that are italicized indicate that the amino acid is located within a coil, the bolded S is referring to the amino acid being in a strand, and the underlined H shows the amino acid is in a helix. The strand and helix structures can then be translated into the predicted tertiary structure done through I-TASSER.

=== Tertiary ===
The predicted tertiary structure of C10orf53 is shown. The tertiary structure contains the seven helix and 8 strand structures predicted through I-TASSER.

== Regulation ==
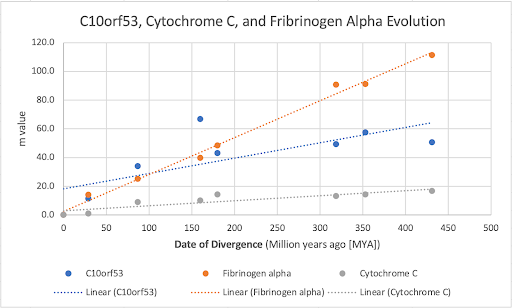
This figure illustrates the evolution trend for the genes above. The amino acid sequences of C10orf53, Fibrinogen Alpha, and Cytochrome C in Homo sapiens were compared to the same sequences of Homo sapiens, Macaca fascicularis, Mus musculus, Monodelphis domestica, Ornithorhynchus anatinus, Gallus gallus, Xenopus tropicalis, and Danio rerio. C10orf53 is shown to have a quicker evolution compared to cytochrome C, but is slower than the fibrinogen alpha's evolution.

=== Gene ===
C10orf53 is primarily expressed in the testes, but also has very low levels of expression in the cerebellum, liver, placenta, and trachea. It is tissue-specific to the testes due to the low expression in other tissues compared to the testes. C10orf53 majorly is secreted in the cytoplasm of cells and has moderate levels in the nucleus and mitochondria.

=== Protein ===
C10orf53 was found to have two phosphorylation sites, two SUMOylation sites, and one lysine acetylation site. All of these regions are shown in the conceptual translation of C10orf53.

== Evolution ==
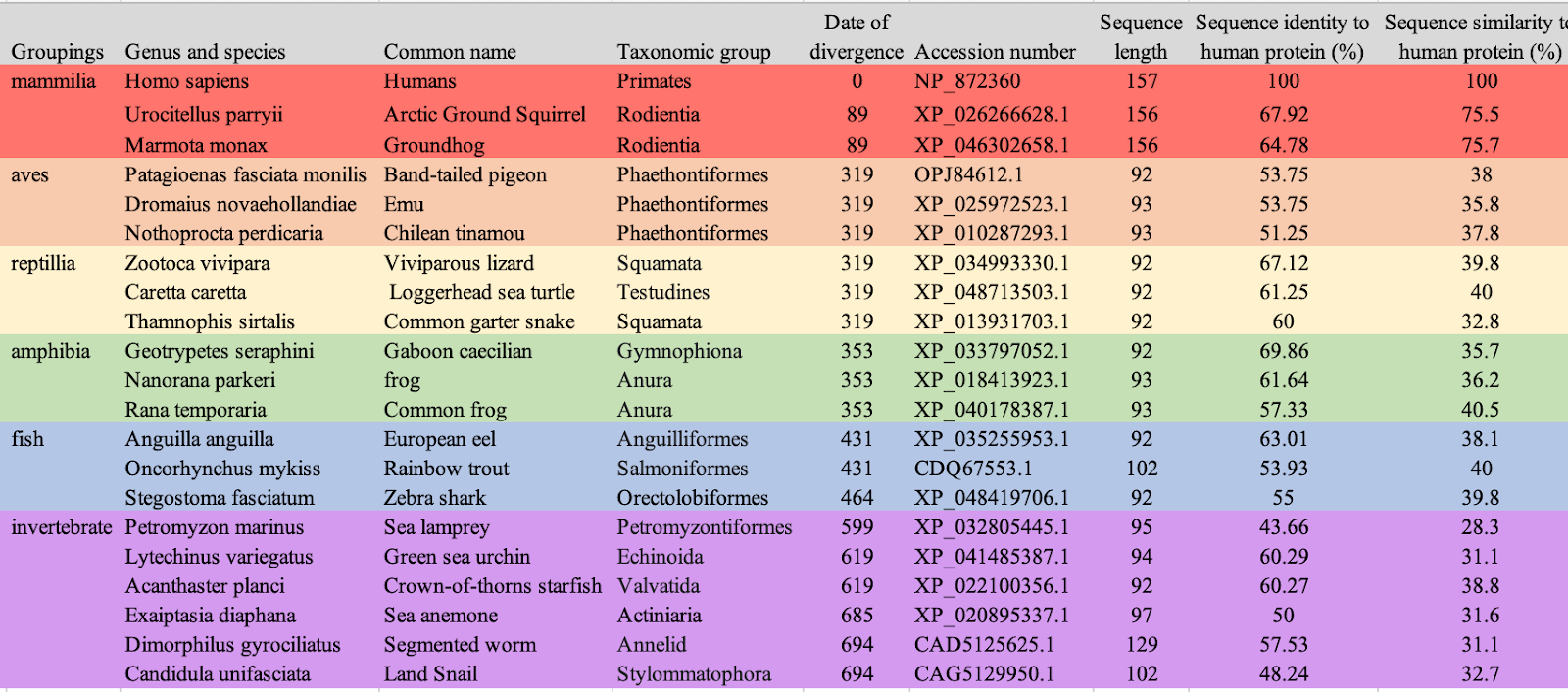
This figure illustrates the orthologs of C10orf53 with the species, common name, taxonomic group, date of divergence, accession number, sequence length, sequence identity percentage, and sequence similarity percentage using NCBI, Integrated Taxonomic Information System, and Time Tree.

C10orf53 is predicted to have a slower evolution compared to the gene, fibrinogen alpha, but it also has a quicker evolution compared to cytochrome c. Fibrinogen alpha is considered as a gene that had evolved rather quickly when examining the gene in different organisms. When two organisms diverged into different taxa, the gene went through alterations that made it significantly different from other organisms, causing it to have a quick rate of evolution. In contrast, Cytochrome C is relatively conserved throughout different organisms, which shows that it has a slow rate of evolution. C10orf53 has a rate of evolution that is smaller than fibrinogen alpha, but larger than cytochrome c.

=== Homology ===
A group of distantly and closely related orthologs were chosen and categorized by their date of divergence from humans. The percent similarity and percent identity in relation to humans showed the predicted conservation between C10orf53 in humans compared to their orthologs.

== Interacting Proteins ==
Protein	Protein Name	Identification	Function
PIGR	Polymeric Immunoglobulin Receptor	Affinity chromatography	Aids in the movement of polymeric IgA and IgM across mucosal epithelial cells
DSCC1	DNA Replication And Sister Chromatid Cohesion 1	Affinity chromatography	Loads PCNA onto primed templates to manipulate replication forks
UXT	Ubiquitously Expressed Prefoldin Like Chaperone	Affinity chromatography	Regulates androgen receptor transcription
ZG16B	Zymogen Granule Protein 16B	Affinity chromatography	Located in the extracellular exosome and enables carbohydrate binding activity
SPECC1L	Sperm Antigen With Calponin Homology And Coiled-Coil Domains 1 Like	Affinity chromatography	Helps with spindle organization and cytokinesis
MNAT1	CDK Activating Kinase	Affinity chromatography	Creates the CDK-activating kinase enzyme complex
SPTB	Spectrin Beta, Erythrocytic	Affinity chromatography	Composes the cytoskeletal network in erythrocyte membranes

The table contains all predicted proteins that were found to interact with C10orf53. It includes the protein acronym and name, the means that identification occurred, and the function of each protein. Due to the related function of some of the proteins, this provides evidence that these interactions coincide with the predicted location.

== Clinical Significance ==
A study was conducted that compared the relative spermatogenesis in humans to the relative expression of RNAs correlated to teratozoospermia. In non-afflicted humans, there is a relatively high expression of C10orf53 across the RNAs tested. However, when a human had teratozoospermia, those levels dropped to almost zero. Another study examined the expression of C10orf53 in spermatogenesis and testis development in mice during development. C10orf53 is only highly expressed from day 30-56 of mice development, with the expression decreasing slightly on each five-day period until 56 days were reached. The final study looked at research done within the past five years has correlated African American prostate cancer patients with the presence of C10orf535. When examining the exosome found in Caucasian populations associated with prostate cancer (PCC) against the African American exosome (PAA), C10orf53 was unique only to PAA.
