= RNF4 =

Protein-coding gene in humans

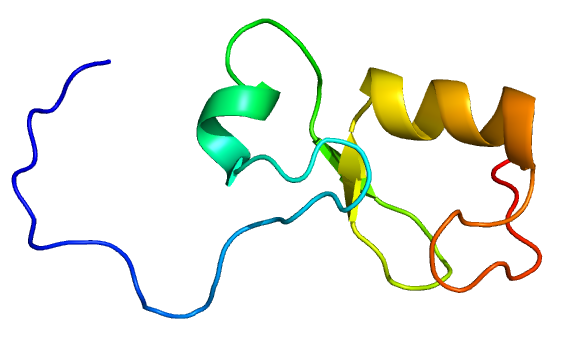

Identifiers
- Aliases: RNF4, SLX5, SNURF, RES4-26, ring finger protein 4
- External IDs: OMIM: 602850; MGI: 1201691; GeneCards: RNF4
Available structures
PDB	Ortholog search: PDBe RCSB
PDB	List of PDB id codes 2EA6, 2XEU, 4PPE
Enzyme activity
EC #	BRENDA	ExPASy	KEGG	MetaCyc
2.3.2.27	↗	↗	↗	↗

Gene location (Human)
Chr.	Chromosome 4 (human)
Band	4p16.3	Start	2,462,220 bp
Band	4p16.3	End	2,625,320 bp

Gene location (Mouse)
Chr.	Chromosome 5 (mouse)
Band	5|5 B2	Start	34,493,633 bp
Band	5|5 B2	End	34,512,973 bp
RNA expression pattern
Bgee	Human / Mouse (ortholog); Top expressed in: thymus; oocyte; middle temporal gyrus; epithelium of colon; tonsil; secondary oocyte; bone marrow cell; lymph node; beta cell; stromal cell of endometrium / Top expressed in: seminiferous tubule; zygote; lactiferous gland; cumulus cell; Ileal epithelium; secondary oocyte; ankle joint; yolk sac; spermatid; epiblast; More reference expression data
BioGPS	n/a
Gene ontology
Molecular function	DNA binding; ubiquitin protein ligase activity; DNA-binding transcription factor activity; transcription coactivator activity; metal ion binding; ubiquitin-protein transferase activity; protein binding; androgen receptor binding; identical protein binding; nucleosome binding; transferase activity; transcription factor binding; SUMO polymer binding; zinc ion binding; nuclear receptor coactivator activity
Cellular component	cytoplasm; PML body; nucleoplasm; nucleus
Biological process	androgen receptor signaling pathway; regulation of transcription, DNA-templated; protein K63-linked ubiquitination; response to arsenic-containing substance; transcription, DNA-templated; positive regulation of transcription, DNA-templated; protein K11-linked ubiquitination; regulation of kinetochore assembly; protein K48-linked ubiquitination; protein K6-linked ubiquitination; protein ubiquitination; regulation of spindle assembly; positive regulation of transcription by RNA polymerase II; proteasome-mediated ubiquitin-dependent protein catabolic process; protein autoubiquitination
Sources:Amigo / QuickGO
Orthologs
Databases	NCBI: entry; OMA: entry
Species	Human	Mouse
Entrez	6047	19822
Ensembl	ENSG00000063978	ENSMUSG00000029110
UniProt	P78317	Q9QZS2
RefSeq (mRNA)	NM_002938; NM_001185009; NM_001185010	NM_011278; NM_001304269; NM_001304270
RefSeq (protein)	NP_001171938; NP_001171939; NP_002929	NP_001291198; NP_001291199; NP_035408
Location (UCSC)	Chr 4: 2.46 – 2.63 Mb	Chr 5: 34.49 – 34.51 Mb
PubMed search
- Wikidata
View/Edit Human	View/Edit Mouse

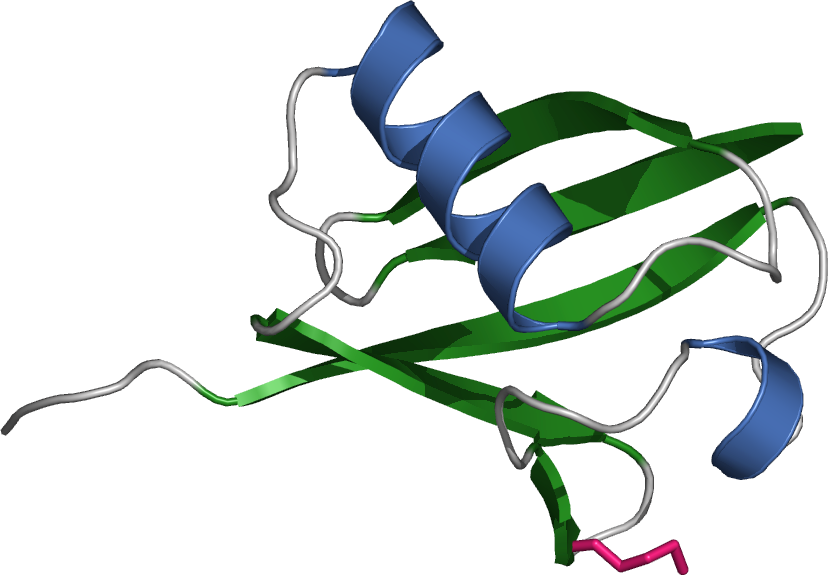
ubiquitin E3 ligase that will recognize target protein

RING finger protein 4 (RNF4) / Small nuclear ring finger protein (SNURF) is a 190-amino acid protein that in humans is encoded by the RNF4 gene.

The RNF4 gene contains 2 nuclear localization signals (NLS), 8 exons, and is approximately 47 kb in length, and weighs ~18 kDa (without isoforms or tags)

The protein encoded by this gene contains a RING finger domain and acts as a transcription factor. This protein has been shown to interact with, and inhibit the activity of, TRPS1, a transcription suppressor of GATA-mediated transcription. This allows TRPS1-regulated genes to be expressed more. Transcription repressor ZNF278/PATZ1 is found to interact with this protein, and thus reduce the enhancement of androgen receptor-dependent transcription mediated by this protein. Studies of the mouse and rat counterparts suggested a role of this protein in spermatogenesis.

== Structure ==
RNF4 protein consists of a dimeric RING domain. The combination of two RING domains is what allows for efficient post translational modification of ubiquitination (the RNF4 tags proteins with ubiquitin chains for degradation to be done by the Proteasome). RNF4 also contains four N-terminal SIM repeats (SmallUbiquitinMOdifier-interacting motifs), as well as one C-terminal which act as mediators when their selective binding to a polysumolated substrate takes place.

RNF4's N-terminal SIM cluster, binds to poly-SUMO chains or units, confirming specificity and as a result RNF4 targets SUMOylated proteins for ubiquination.

== Functions ==
RNF4 functions as a STUbL (SUMO-targeted ubiquitin ligase). This is an E3 ubiquitin ligase that recognized proteins that have been modified with SUMO groups/chains. Specifically, during ubiquitination, the SUMOylated proteins are tagged witih polyubiquitin chains. These chains are recognized by the proteasome, which then unfolds the protein to degrade it in to peptides.

RNF4 also contributes to genome stability. It can do this through the repair of damaged DNA prior to mitosis. SUMOylated DNA-protein crosslinks (DPCs) that threaten the stability of a genome are removed by RNF4. After DNA replication, RNF4 protein helps prevent chromosome segregation defects and apoptosis through targeted SUMOylation. Since this occurs outside of DNA replication, RNF4 is able to protect the cell even outside of the S phase of the cell cycle. The specific mechanisms on how are still being studied.

RNF4 has derepressing abilities/ gene regulating abilities, as mentioned in Wang's study from 2014. RNF4 derepresses gene expression by targeting the proteins that bind to methylated DNA. After this they are marked for ubiquitination

A recent study looked into what role RNF4 would take on with under-replicated DNA. Taking place at common fragile sites (CFSs), the under-replicated DNA that continued on after S phase were packed into 53BP1-NuclearBodies by cells to protect them from damage. These nuclear bodies allow the DNA to continue through the cell cycle. This study used cells missing the RNF4 gene and saw there was an increase in the nuclear bodies. This supported their idea that RNF4 regulates protein degradation, and if not present there would be under-replication.

The overexpression of RNF4 resulted in an increase in the enzymatic activities of endogenous base excision repair enzymes TDG and APE1 as well an increase in the mismatch repair efficiency. This reinforces RNF4s role in DNA repair.

Another study involving mice showed the RNF4 protein is essential for embryonic development. Without this gene, embryo growth comes to a halt. Additionally, in rats, acute promyelocytic leukemia (APL) is treated with arsenic since it induces conjugation of SUMO and degrades PML (promyelocytic leukaemia) protein. RNF4 binds to poly-SUMO2-modified PML through the four N-terminal SIMs previously mentioned and the absence of RNF4 causes there to be no degradation of PML protein by arsenic.

There are currently no human diseases associated with this protein. Studies indicate that RNF4 is involved in regulating degradation, genome protection and stability from replication and DPCs, which highlights its critical role in normal cellular function.

== Interactions ==
RNF4 has been shown to interact with TCF20, PATZ1, TRPS1 and Androgen receptor. RNF4 has been shown to be responsible for the degradation of the Werner syndrome helicase in MSI-H cells after WRN inhibition. Studies show RNF4 binds to both ubiquitin charged UbcH5a (strongly) and uncharged UbcH5a (weakly). The RNF4 dimers activate the E2 ubiquitin thioester for catalysis.

== See also ==
- RING finger domain

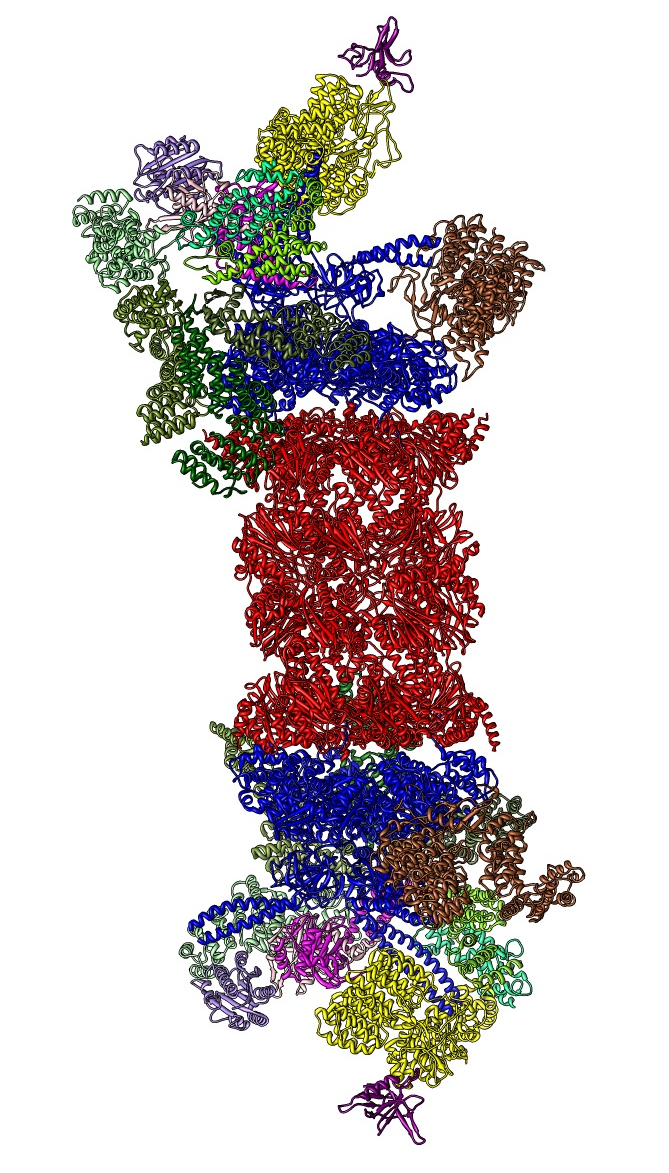
26S proteasome structure
