= ZMIZ1 =

Protein-coding gene in the species Homo sapiens

Identifiers
- Aliases: ZMIZ1, MIZ, RAI17, TRAFIP10, ZIMP10, hZIMP10, zinc finger MIZ-type containing 1, NEDDFSA
- External IDs: OMIM: 607159; MGI: 3040693; GeneCards: ZMIZ1
Available structures
PDB	Ortholog search: PDBe RCSB
PDB	List of PDB id codes 5AIZ

Gene location (Human)
Chr.	Chromosome 10 (human)
Band	10q22.3	Start	79,068,966 bp
Band	10q22.3	End	79,316,519 bp

Gene location (Mouse)
Chr.	Chromosome 14 (mouse)
Band	14|14 A3	Start	25,459,609 bp
Band	14|14 A3	End	25,667,167 bp
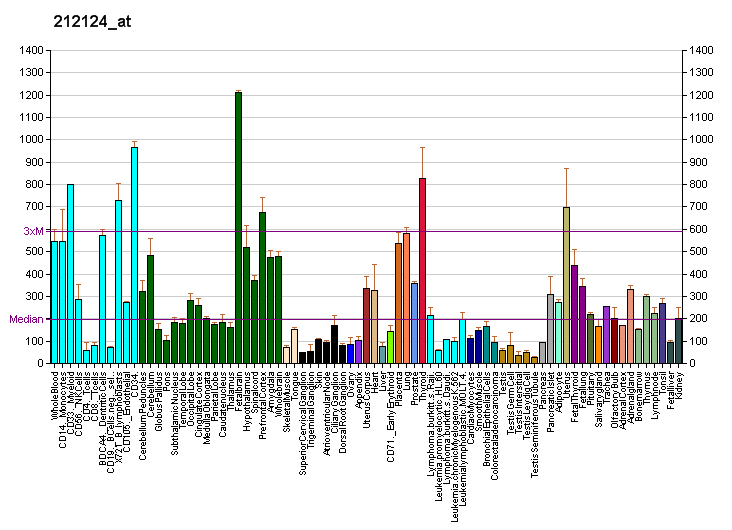
RNA expression pattern
Bgee	Human / Mouse (ortholog); Top expressed in: dorsal motor nucleus of vagus nerve; tibia; seminal vesicula; inferior olivary nucleus; ganglionic eminence; endothelial cell; synovial joint; urethra; vulva; hair follicle / Top expressed in: Rostral migratory stream; gastrula; genital tubercle; stroma of bone marrow; epithelium of stomach; molar; tail of embryo; cumulus cell; ventricular zone; olfactory epithelium; More reference expression data
BioGPS	More reference expression data
Gene ontology
Molecular function	zinc ion binding; metal ion binding
Cellular component	cytoplasm; nucleus; nuclear speck; intracellular membrane-bounded organelle; nucleoplasm
Biological process	vasculogenesis; heart morphogenesis; developmental growth; in utero embryonic development; regulation of transcription, DNA-templated; transcription, DNA-templated; vitellogenesis; artery morphogenesis; positive regulation of fibroblast proliferation; positive regulation of T cell differentiation; positive regulation of Notch signaling pathway; positive regulation of transcription by RNA polymerase II
Sources:Amigo / QuickGO
Orthologs
Databases	NCBI: entry; OMA: entry
Species	Human	Mouse
Entrez	57178	328365
Ensembl	ENSG00000108175	ENSMUSG00000007817
UniProt	Q9ULJ6	Q6P1E1
RefSeq (mRNA)	NM_020338	NM_001033402; NM_183208; NM_001310666
RefSeq (protein)	NP_065071	NP_001297595; NP_899031
Location (UCSC)	Chr 10: 79.07 – 79.32 Mb	Chr 14: 25.46 – 25.67 Mb
PubMed search
- Wikidata
View/Edit Human	View/Edit Mouse

Zinc finger MIZ domain-containing protein 1 is a protein that in humans is encoded by the ZMIZ1 gene.

== Interactions ==
ZMIZ1 has been shown to interact with Androgen receptor.
