= RCHY1 =

Protein-coding gene in the species Homo sapiens

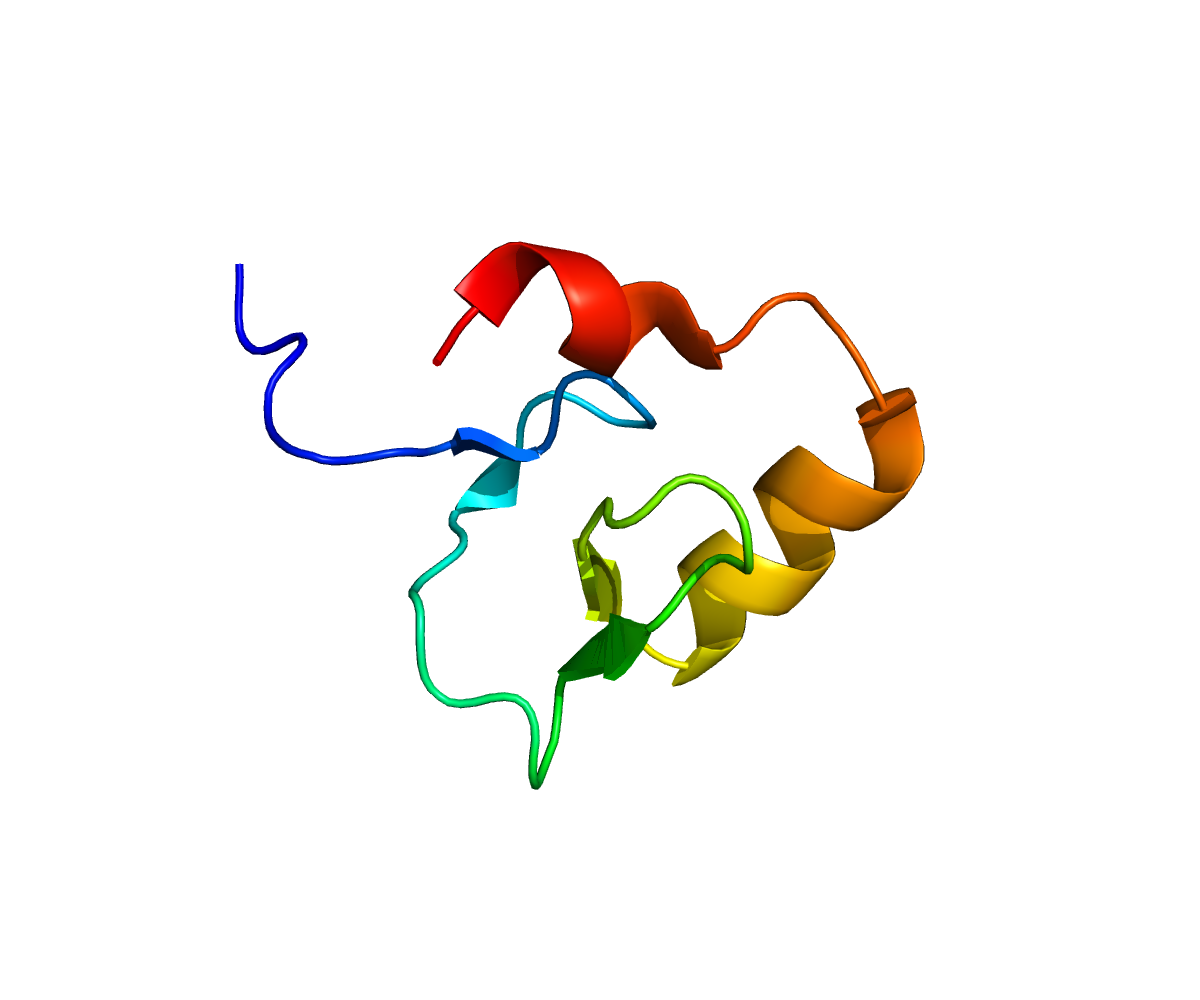

Identifiers
- Aliases: RCHY1, ARNIP, CHIMP, PIRH2, PRO1996, RNF199, ZCHY, ZNF363, ring finger and CHY zinc finger domain containing 1
- External IDs: OMIM: 607680; MGI: 1915348; GeneCards: RCHY1
Available structures
PDB	Ortholog search: PDBe RCSB
PDB	List of PDB id codes 2JRJ, 2K2C, 2K2D
Enzyme activity
EC #	BRENDA	ExPASy	KEGG	MetaCyc
2.3.2.27	↗	↗	↗	↗

Gene location (Mouse)
Chr.	Chromosome 5 (mouse)
Band	5|5 E2	Start	92,096,763 bp
Band	5|5 E2	End	92,110,927 bp
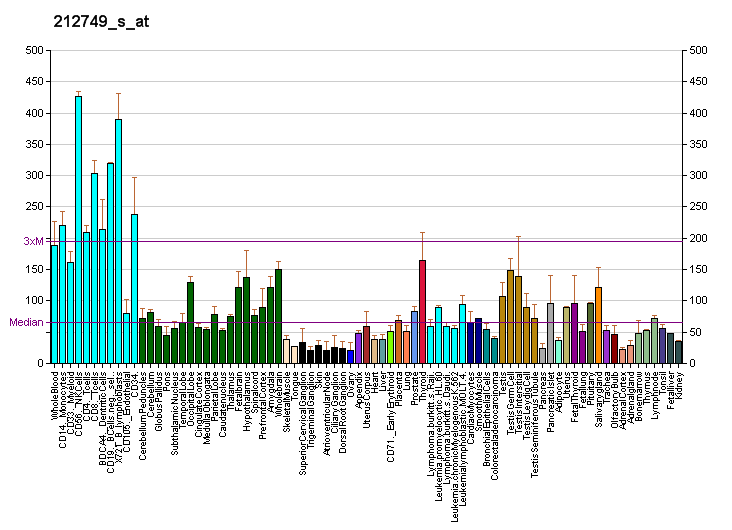

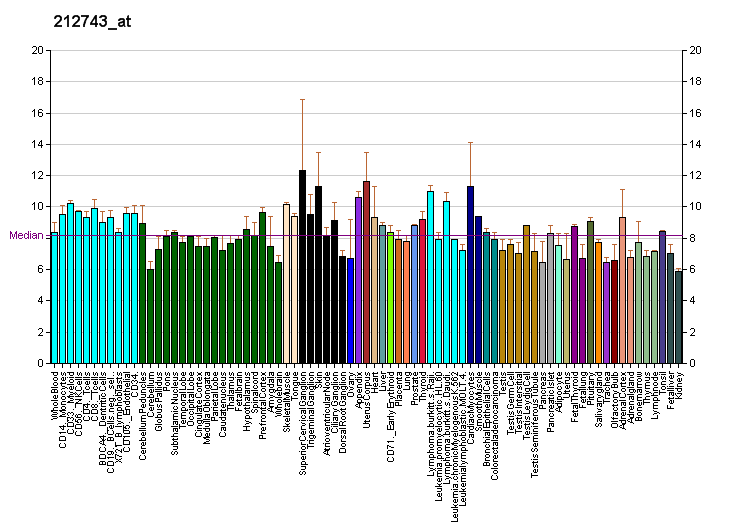

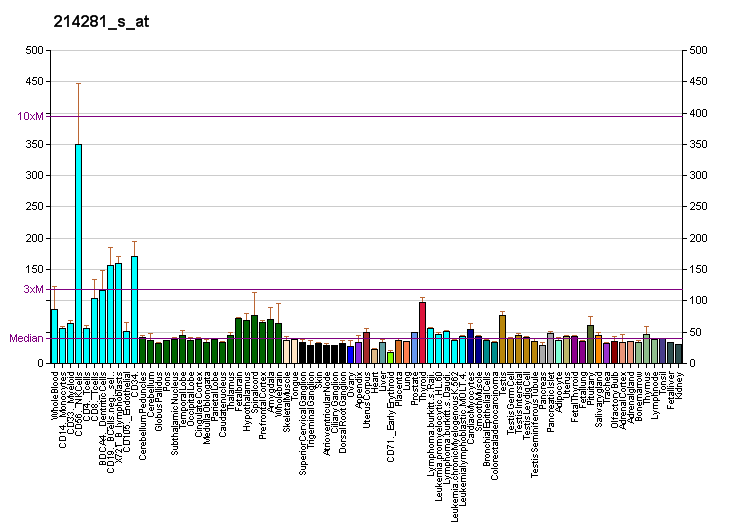
RNA expression pattern
Bgee	Human / Mouse (ortholog); Top expressed in: sperm; secondary oocyte; endothelial cell; germinal epithelium; islet of Langerhans; right ventricle; biceps brachii; parietal pleura; Brodmann area 23; palpebral conjunctiva / Top expressed in: interventricular septum; zygote; granulocyte; secondary oocyte; endocardial cushion; seminal vesicula; parotid gland; medial ganglionic eminence; molar; temporal muscle; More reference expression data
BioGPS	More reference expression data
Gene ontology
Molecular function	zinc ion binding; p53 binding; protein binding; protein homodimerization activity; metal ion binding; ubiquitin-protein transferase activity; transferase activity; signaling receptor binding
Cellular component	ubiquitin ligase complex; cytoplasm; nuclear speck; nucleus; nucleoplasm; cytosol
Biological process	error-free translesion synthesis; positive regulation of protein ubiquitination; positive regulation of proteasomal ubiquitin-dependent protein catabolic process; protein ubiquitination; protein autoubiquitination; ubiquitin-dependent protein catabolic process
Sources:Amigo / QuickGO
Orthologs
Databases	NCBI: entry
Species	Human	Mouse
Entrez	25898	68098
Ensembl	n/a	ENSMUSG00000029397
UniProt	Q96PM5	Q9CR50
RefSeq (mRNA)	NM_001008925; NM_001009922; NM_001278536; NM_001278537; NM_001278538 NM_001278539; NM_015436; NM_001387136; NM_001387137	NM_001271797; NM_026557
RefSeq (protein)	NP_001009922; NP_001265465; NP_001265466; NP_001265467; NP_001265468 NP_056251	NP_001258726; NP_080833
Location (UCSC)	n/a	Chr 5: 92.1 – 92.11 Mb
PubMed search
- Wikidata
View/Edit Human	View/Edit Mouse

RING finger and CHY zinc finger domain-containing protein 1 is a protein that in humans is encoded by the RCHY1 gene.

== Function ==
The protein encoded by this gene has ubiquitin-protein ligase activity. This protein binds with p53 and promotes the ubiquitin-mediated proteosomal degradation of p53. This gene is oncogenic because loss of p53 function contributes directly to malignant tumor development. Transcription of this gene is regulated by p53. Alternative splicing results in multiple transcript variants encoding different isoforms.

== Interactions ==
RCHY1 has been shown to interact with P53 and Androgen receptor.
