= TCF20 =

Protein-coding gene in the species Homo sapiens

Identifiers
- Aliases: TCF20, AR1, SPBP, TCF-20, transcription factor 20 (AR1), transcription factor 20, DDVIBA
- External IDs: OMIM: 603107; MGI: 108399; GeneCards: TCF20

Gene location (Human)
Chr.	Chromosome 22 (human)
Band	22q13.2|22q13.3	Start	42,160,013 bp
Band	22q13.2|22q13.3	End	42,343,616 bp

Gene location (Mouse)
Chr.	Chromosome 15 (mouse)
Band	15|15 E1	Start	82,692,637 bp
Band	15|15 E1	End	82,872,073 bp
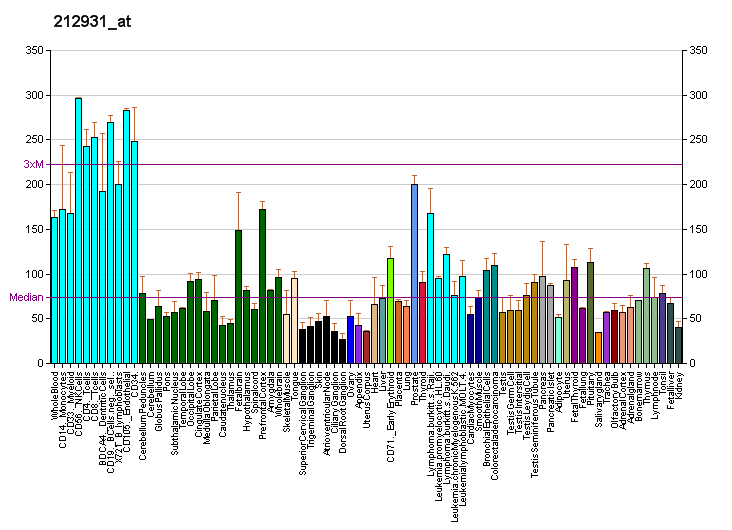
RNA expression pattern
Bgee	Human / Mouse (ortholog); Top expressed in: ganglionic eminence; bone marrow cell; islet of Langerhans; tonsil; mucosa of esophagus; blood; granulocyte; lymph node; olfactory zone of nasal mucosa; superior frontal gyrus / Top expressed in: Rostral migratory stream; genital tubercle; tail of embryo; dentate gyrus of hippocampal formation granule cell; secondary oocyte; olfactory tubercle; ciliary body; dorsal striatum; conjunctival fornix; supraoptic nucleus; More reference expression data
BioGPS	More reference expression data
Gene ontology
Molecular function	DNA binding; transcription coactivator activity; metal ion binding; RNA binding; DNA-binding transcription factor activity; protein binding
Cellular component	nucleoplasm; nuclear body; nucleus
Biological process	regulation of transcription, DNA-templated; transcription, DNA-templated; positive regulation of transcription by RNA polymerase II
Sources:Amigo / QuickGO
Orthologs
Databases	NCBI: entry; OMA: entry
Species	Human	Mouse
Entrez	6942	21411
Ensembl	ENSG00000283681; ENSG00000281897; ENSG00000262024; ENSG00000282892; ENSG00000283026 ENSG00000280467; ENSG00000100207; ENSG00000276461	ENSMUSG00000041852
UniProt	Q9UGU0	Q9EPQ8
RefSeq (mRNA)	NM_005650; NM_181492; NM_001378418	NM_001114140; NM_013836
RefSeq (protein)	NP_005641; NP_852469; NP_001365347	NP_001107612; NP_038864; NP_001389767
Location (UCSC)	Chr 22: 42.16 – 42.34 Mb	Chr 15: 82.69 – 82.87 Mb
PubMed search
- Wikidata
View/Edit Human	View/Edit Mouse

Transcription factor 20 is a protein that in humans is encoded by the TCF20 gene.

The protein encoded by this gene binds a platelet-derived growth factor-responsive element in the matrix metalloproteinase 3. The protein localizes to the nucleus and displays DNA-binding and transactivation activities. It is thought to be a transcriptional coactivator, enhancing the activity of transcription factors such as JUN and SP1. Alternative splicing results in two transcript variants encoding different isoforms.

== Interactions ==
TCF20 has been shown to interact with RNF4.
