= TRIM68 =

Protein-coding gene in the species Homo sapiens

Identifiers
- Aliases: TRIM68, GC109, RNF137, SS-56, SS56, tripartite motif containing 68
- External IDs: OMIM: 613184; MGI: 2142077; GeneCards: TRIM68
Enzyme activity
EC #	BRENDA	ExPASy	KEGG	MetaCyc
2.3.2.27	↗	↗	↗	↗

Gene location (Human)
Chr.	Chromosome 11 (human)
Band	11p15.4	Start	4,598,672 bp
Band	11p15.4	End	4,608,231 bp

Gene location (Mouse)
Chr.	Chromosome 7 (mouse)
Band	7|7 E3	Start	102,326,789 bp
Band	7|7 E3	End	102,336,534 bp
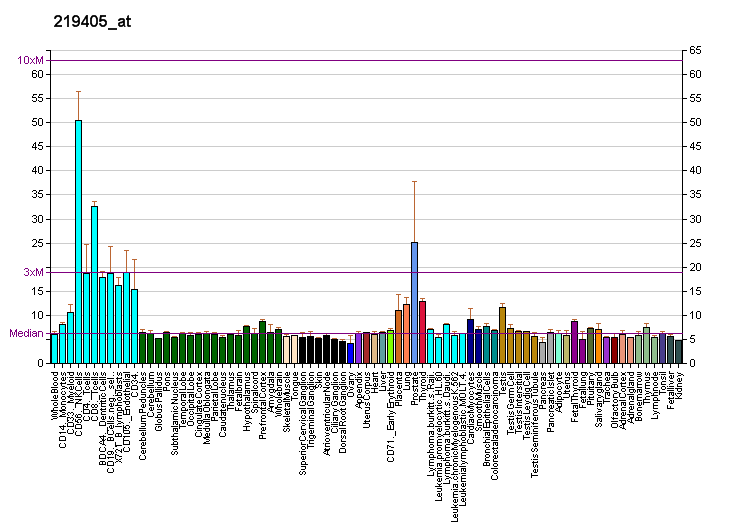

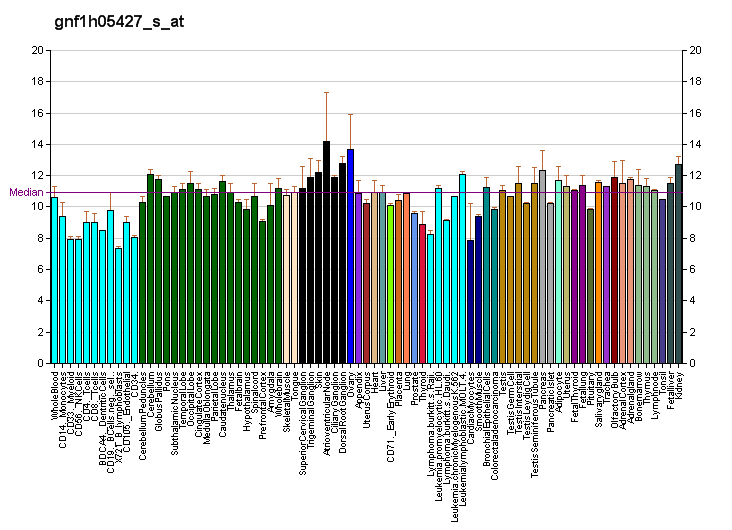
RNA expression pattern
Bgee	Human / Mouse (ortholog); Top expressed in: palpebral conjunctiva; epithelium of bronchus; bronchial epithelial cell; prostate; gonad; right lobe of thyroid gland; glomerulus; metanephric glomerulus; parietal pleura; left lobe of thyroid gland / Top expressed in: lumbar spinal ganglion; mucosa of urinary bladder; transitional epithelium of urinary bladder; genital tubercle; lobe of prostate; retinal pigment epithelium; mammary gland; Paneth cell; urethra; superior cervical ganglion; More reference expression data
BioGPS	More reference expression data
Gene ontology
Molecular function	zinc ion binding; androgen receptor binding; histone acetyltransferase binding; metal ion binding; ubiquitin-protein transferase activity; transferase activity
Cellular component	cytoplasm; perinuclear region of cytoplasm; Golgi apparatus; nucleolus; intracellular anatomical structure; nucleus; cytosol
Biological process	interferon-gamma-mediated signaling pathway; regulation of androgen receptor signaling pathway; protein ubiquitination; protein autoubiquitination
Sources:Amigo / QuickGO
Orthologs
Databases	NCBI: entry; OMA: entry
Species	Human	Mouse
Entrez	55128	101700
Ensembl	ENSG00000167333	ENSMUSG00000073968
UniProt	Q6AZZ1	Q8K243
RefSeq (mRNA)	NM_018073; NM_001304496	NM_198012; NM_001307998
RefSeq (protein)	NP_001291425; NP_060543	n/a
Location (UCSC)	Chr 11: 4.6 – 4.61 Mb	Chr 7: 102.33 – 102.34 Mb
PubMed search
- Wikidata
View/Edit Human	View/Edit Mouse

Tripartite motif-containing protein 68 is a protein that in humans is encoded by the TRIM68 gene.

The protein encoded by this gene contains a RING finger domain, a motif present in a variety of functionally distinct proteins and known to be involved in protein-protein and protein-DNA interactions. This gene is expressed in many cancer cell lines. Its expression in normal tissues, however, was found to be restricted to prostate. This gene was also found to be differentially expressed in androgen-dependent versus androgen-independent prostate cancer cells.

== Interactions ==
TRIM68 has been shown to interact with Androgen receptor.
