= PATZ1 =

Protein-coding gene in the species Homo sapiens

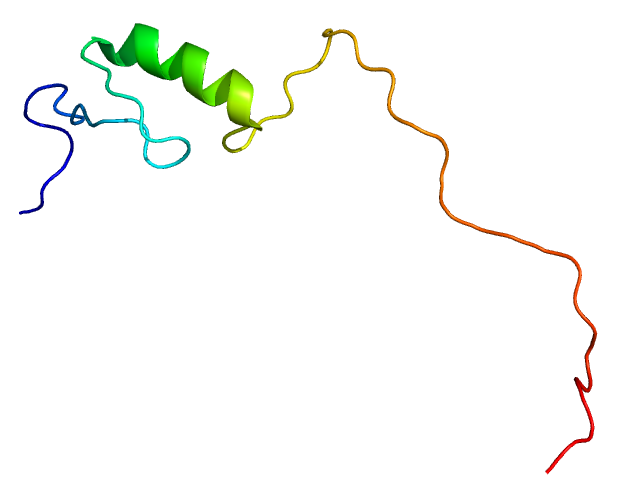

Identifiers
- Aliases: PATZ1, MAZR, PATZ, RIAZ, ZBTB19, ZNF278, ZSG, dJ400N23, POZ/BTB and AT hook containing zinc finger 1
- External IDs: OMIM: 605165; MGI: 1891832; GeneCards: PATZ1
Available structures
PDB	Ortholog search: PDBe RCSB
PDB	List of PDB id codes 2EPP, 2EPQ, 2EPR, 2EPS, 2YT9

Gene location (Human)
Chr.	Chromosome 22 (human)
Band	22q12.2	Start	31,325,804 bp
Band	22q12.2	End	31,346,346 bp

Gene location (Mouse)
Chr.	Chromosome 11 (mouse)
Band	11|11 A1	Start	3,238,874 bp
Band	11|11 A1	End	3,259,083 bp
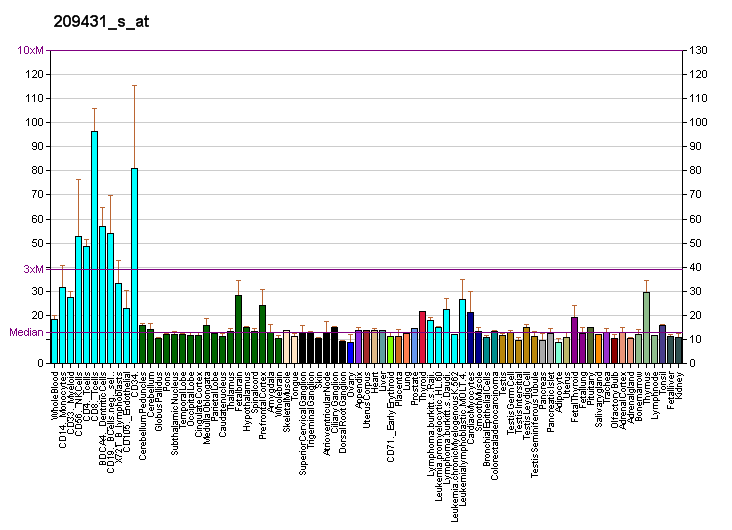

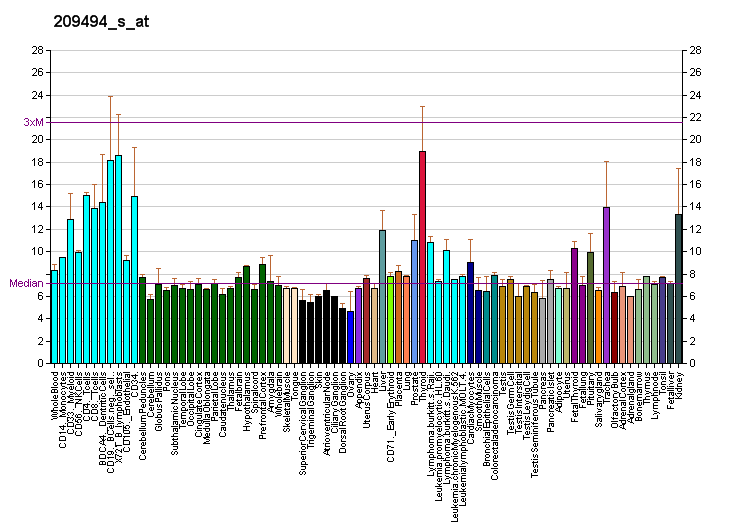

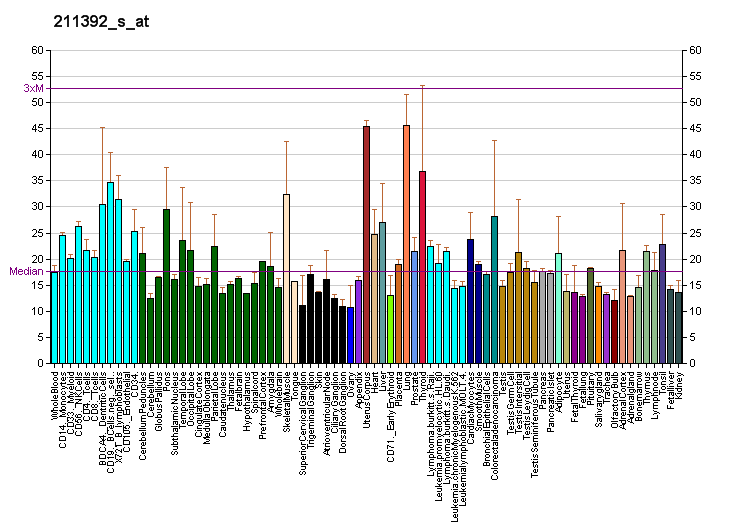
RNA expression pattern
Bgee	Human / Mouse (ortholog); Top expressed in: ventricular zone; ganglionic eminence; right lobe of thyroid gland; right uterine tube; left lobe of thyroid gland; olfactory zone of nasal mucosa; gonad; minor salivary glands; paraflocculus of cerebellum; ovary / Top expressed in: tail of embryo; genital tubercle; ventricular zone; zygote; thymus; neural tube; otolith organ; utricle; embryo; muscle of thigh; More reference expression data
BioGPS	More reference expression data
Gene ontology
Molecular function	RNA polymerase II cis-regulatory region sequence-specific DNA binding; DNA binding; DNA-binding transcription activator activity, RNA polymerase II-specific; chromatin binding; protein binding; metal ion binding; nucleic acid binding; DNA-binding transcription factor activity, RNA polymerase II-specific
Cellular component	nucleus; nucleoplasm
Biological process	regulation of gene expression; positive regulation of transcription, DNA-templated; T cell differentiation; male gonad development; negative regulation of transcription, DNA-templated; regulation of transcription, DNA-templated; transcription by RNA polymerase II; spermatogenesis; positive regulation of transcription by RNA polymerase II; transcription, DNA-templated
Sources:Amigo / QuickGO
Orthologs
Databases	NCBI: entry; OMA: entry
Species	Human	Mouse
Entrez	23598	56218
Ensembl	ENSG00000100105	ENSMUSG00000020453
UniProt	Q9HBE1	Q5NBY9
RefSeq (mRNA)	NM_032052; NM_014323; NM_032050; NM_032051	NM_001253690; NM_001253691; NM_019574
RefSeq (protein)	NP_055138; NP_114439; NP_114440; NP_114441	NP_001240619; NP_001240620; NP_062520
Location (UCSC)	Chr 22: 31.33 – 31.35 Mb	Chr 11: 3.24 – 3.26 Mb
PubMed search
- Wikidata
View/Edit Human	View/Edit Mouse

POZ-, AT hook-, and zinc finger-containing protein 1 is a protein that in humans is encoded by the PATZ1 gene.

== Gene ==
Four alternatively spliced transcript variants are described for this gene.

== Function ==
The protein encoded by this gene contains an AT-hook DNA binding motif, which usually binds to other DNA binding structures to play an important role in chromatin modeling and transcription regulation. Its Poz domain is thought to function as a site for protein-protein interaction and is required for transcriptional repression, and the zinc-fingers comprise the DNA binding domain. Since the encoded protein has typical features of a transcription factor, it is postulated to be a repressor of gene expression..

== Clinical significance ==
In small round cell sarcoma, this gene is fused to EWS by a small inversion of 22q, then the hybrid is thought to be translocated (t(1;22)(p36.1;q12). The rearrangement of chromosome 22 involves intron 8 of EWS and exon 1 of this gene creating a chimeric sequence containing the transactivation domain of EWS fused to zinc finger domain of this protein. This is a distinct example of an intra-chromosomal rearrangement of chromosome 22.

== Interactions ==
PATZ1 has been shown to interact with:

- Androgen receptor,
- Microphthalmia-associated transcription factor, and
- RNF4.
