= Androgen receptor =

Mammalian protein found in humans

AR
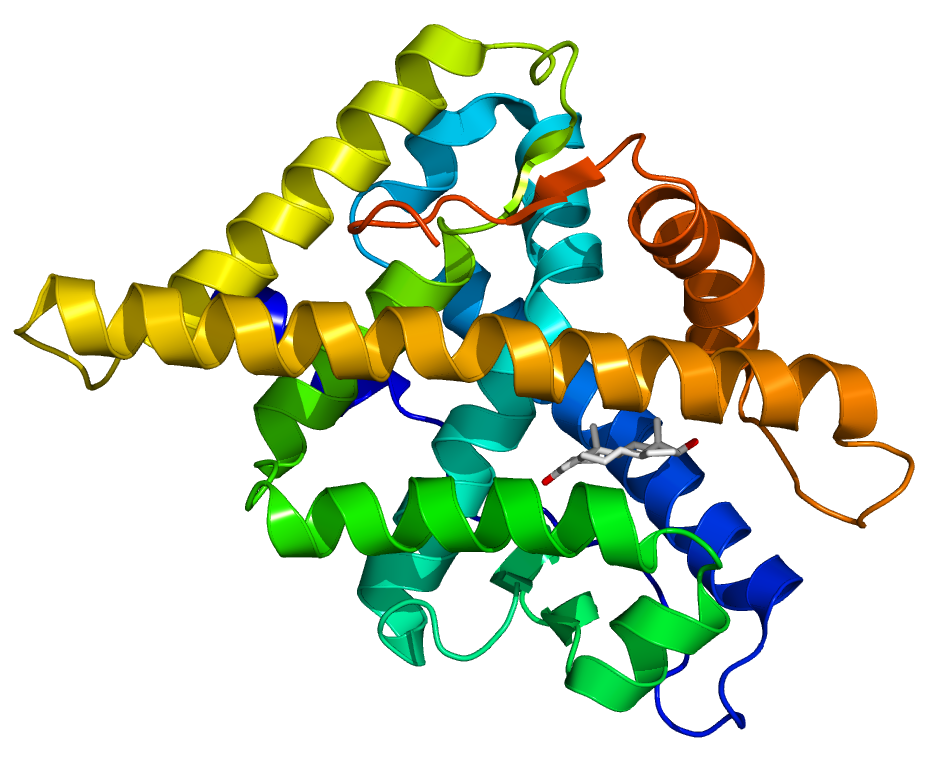

Identifiers
- Aliases: AR, AIS, AR8, DHTR, HUMARA, HYSP1, KD, NR3C4, SBMA, SMAX1, TFM, androgen receptor
- External IDs: OMIM: 313700; MGI: 88064; GeneCards: AR
Available structures
PDB	Ortholog search: PDBe RCSB
PDB	List of PDB id codes 1E3G, 1GS4, 1T5Z, 1T63, 1T65, 1XJ7, 1XOW, 1XQ3, 1Z95, 2AM9, 2AMA, 2AMB, 2AO6, 2AX6, 2AX7, 2AX8, 2AX9, 2AXA, 2HVC, 2OZ7, 2PIO, 2PIP, 2PIQ, 2PIR, 2PIT, 2PIU, 2PIV, 2PIW, 2PIX, 2PKL, 2PNU, 2Q7I, 2Q7J, 2Q7K, 2YHD, 2YLO, 2YLP, 2YLQ, 2Z4J, 3B5R, 3B65, 3B66, 3B67, 3B68, 3BTR, 3V49, 3V4A, 3ZQT, 4HLW, 3L3X, 3L3Z, 3RLJ, 3RLL, 4K7A, 4OEA, 4OED, 4OEY, 4OEZ, 4OFR, 4OFU, 4OGH, 4OH5, 4OH6, 4OHA, 4OIL, 4OIU, 4OJ9, 4OJB, 4OK1, 4OKB, 4OKT, 4OKW, 4OKX, 4OLM, 4QL8, 5CJ6

Gene location (Human)
Chr.	X chromosome (human)
Band	Xq12	Start	67,544,021 bp
Band	Xq12	End	67,730,619 bp

Gene location (Mouse)
Chr.	X chromosome (mouse)
Band	X C3|X 42.82 cM	Start	97,192,375 bp
Band	X C3|X 42.82 cM	End	97,366,821 bp
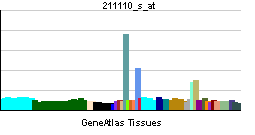

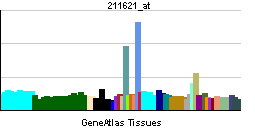
RNA expression pattern
Bgee	Human / Mouse (ortholog); Top expressed in: seminal vesicula; urethra; nipple; vulva; corpus epididymis; human penis; caput epididymis; tail of epididymis; lactiferous duct; liver / Top expressed in: lacrimal gland; ventromedial nucleus; seminal vesicula; efferent ductule; cumulus cell; lobe of prostate; anterior amygdaloid area; lateral hypothalamus; triceps brachii muscle; vas deferens; More reference expression data
BioGPS	More reference expression data
Gene ontology
Molecular function	metal ion binding; lipid binding; signaling receptor binding; sequence-specific DNA binding; RNA polymerase II cis-regulatory region sequence-specific DNA binding; protein dimerization activity; chromatin binding; zinc ion binding; nuclear receptor activity; ATPase binding; androgen binding; steroid binding; DNA-binding transcription activator activity, RNA polymerase II-specific; transcription factor binding; protein binding; DNA binding; beta-catenin binding; POU domain binding; enzyme binding; DNA-binding transcription factor activity; DNA-binding transcription factor activity, RNA polymerase II-specific; RNA polymerase II general transcription initiation factor binding; steroid hormone receptor activity
Cellular component	nucleoplasm; cytoplasm; cytosol; nucleus; plasma membrane; nuclear speck; protein-containing complex
Biological process	negative regulation of cell population proliferation; positive regulation of cell differentiation; positive regulation of NF-kappaB transcription factor activity; sex differentiation; signal transduction; negative regulation of integrin biosynthetic process; cell-cell signaling; intracellular receptor signaling pathway; prostate gland development; positive regulation of integrin biosynthetic process; positive regulation of phosphorylation; androgen receptor signaling pathway; positive regulation of gene expression; positive regulation of cell population proliferation; positive regulation of transcription, DNA-templated; negative regulation of extrinsic apoptotic signaling pathway; transcription initiation from RNA polymerase II promoter; regulation of transcription, DNA-templated; cell population proliferation; cell growth; positive regulation of transcription by RNA polymerase III; protein complex oligomerization; transcription, DNA-templated; positive regulation of insulin-like growth factor receptor signaling pathway; male somatic sex determination; positive regulation of intracellular estrogen receptor signaling pathway; negative regulation of epithelial cell proliferation; regulation of gene expression; regulation of systemic arterial blood pressure; positive regulation of transcription by RNA polymerase II; animal organ formation; multicellular organism growth; positive regulation of MAPK cascade; in utero embryonic development; reproductive system development; tertiary branching involved in mammary gland duct morphogenesis; cellular process or phenomenon; male gonad development; single fertilization; fertilization; regulation of prostatic bud formation; mammary gland alveolus development; epithelial cell differentiation involved in prostate gland development; epithelial cell morphogenesis; regulation of transcription by RNA polymerase II; seminiferous tubule development; morphogenesis of an epithelial fold; prostate gland epithelium morphogenesis; Leydig cell differentiation; reproductive structure development; regulation of catalytic activity; regulation of developmental growth; lateral sprouting involved in mammary gland duct morphogenesis; male genitalia morphogenesis; prostate gland growth; activation of prostate induction by androgen receptor signaling pathway; spermatogenesis; protein deubiquitination; positive regulation of epithelial cell proliferation involved in prostate gland development; negative regulation of transcription by RNA polymerase II; cellular response to steroid hormone stimulus; cellular response to testosterone stimulus; regulation of protein localization to plasma membrane
Sources:Amigo / QuickGO
Orthologs
Databases	NCBI: entry; OMA: entry
Species	Human	Mouse
Entrez	367	11835
Ensembl	ENSG00000169083	ENSMUSG00000046532
UniProt	P10275; Q9NUA2	P19091
RefSeq (mRNA)	NM_001011645; NM_000044; NM_001348061; NM_001348063; NM_001348064	NM_013476
RefSeq (protein)	NP_000035; NP_001011645; NP_001334990; NP_001334992; NP_001334993 NP_000035.2; NP_001011645.1	NP_038504
Location (UCSC)	Chr X: 67.54 – 67.73 Mb	Chr X: 97.19 – 97.37 Mb
PubMed search
- Wikidata
View/Edit Human	View/Edit Mouse

Androgen_recep
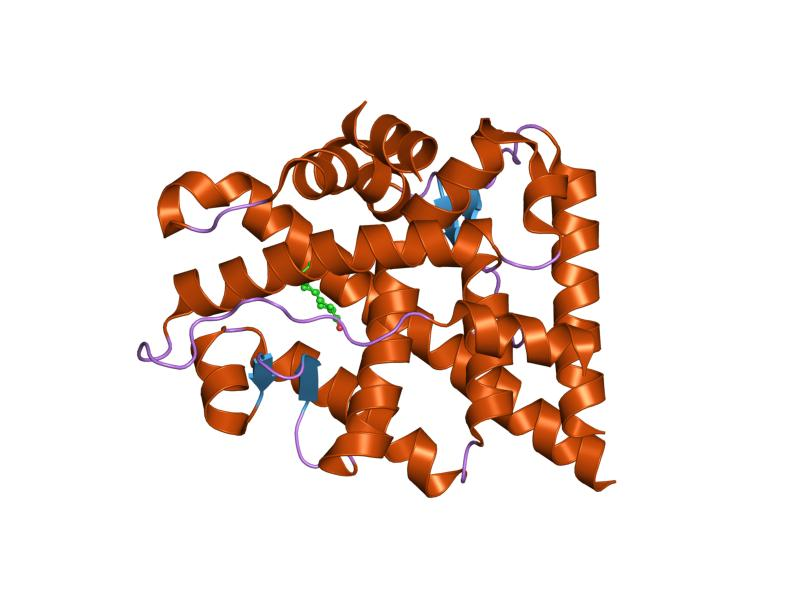
- crystal structure of the human androgen receptor ligand binding domain bound with an androgen receptor nh2-terminal peptide, ar20-30, and r1881

Identifiers
- Symbol: Androgen_recep
- Pfam: PF02166
- InterPro: IPR001103
Available protein structures:
- PDB: IPR001103 PF02166 (ECOD; PDBsum)
- AlphaFold: IPR001103; PF02166

Normal function of the androgen receptor. Testosterone (T) enters the cell and, if 5-alpha-reductase is present, is converted into dihydrotestosterone (DHT). Upon steroid binding, the androgen receptor (AR) undergoes a conformational change and releases heat-shock proteins (hsps). Phosphorylation (P) occurs before or after steroid binding. The AR translocates to the nucleus where dimerization, DNA binding, and the recruitment of coactivators occur. Target genes are transcribed (mRNA) and translated into proteins.

The androgen receptor (AR), also known as NR3C4 (nuclear receptor subfamily 3, group C, member 4), is a type of nuclear receptor that is activated by binding any of the androgenic hormones, including testosterone and dihydrotestosterone, in the cytoplasm and then translocating into the nucleus. The androgen receptor is most closely related to the progesterone receptor, and progestins in higher dosages can block the androgen receptor.

The main function of the androgen receptor is as a DNA-binding transcription factor that regulates gene expression; however, the androgen receptor has other functions as well. Androgen-regulated genes are critical for the development and maintenance of the male sexual phenotype.

== Function ==
=== Effect on development ===
In some cell types, testosterone interacts directly with androgen receptors, whereas, in others, testosterone is converted by 5-alpha-reductase to dihydrotestosterone (DHT), an even more potent agonist for androgen receptor activation. Testosterone appears to be the primary androgen receptor-activating hormone in the Wolffian duct, whereas dihydrotestosterone is the main androgenic hormone in the urogenital sinus, urogenital tubercle, and hair follicles. Testosterone is therefore responsible primarily for the development of male primary sexual characteristics, whilst dihydrotestosterone is responsible for secondary male characteristics.

Androgens cause slow maturation of the bones, but more of the potent maturation effect comes from the estrogen produced by aromatization of androgens. Steroid users of teen age may find that their growth had been stunted by androgen and/or estrogen excess. People with too little sex hormones can be short during puberty but end up taller as adults as in androgen insensitivity syndrome or estrogen insensitivity syndrome.

Knockout-mice studies have shown that the androgen receptor is essential for normal female fertility, being required for development and full functionality of the ovarian follicles and ovulation, working through both intra-ovarian and neuroendocrine mechanisms.

=== Maintenance of male skeletal integrity ===
Via the androgen receptor, androgens play a key role in the maintenance of male skeletal integrity. The regulation of this integrity by androgen receptor (AR) signaling can be attributed to both osteoblasts and osteocytes.

=== Role in females ===
The AR plays a role in regulating female sexual, somatic, and behavioral functions. Experimental data using AR knockout female mice, provides evidence that the promotion of cardiac growth, kidney hypertrophy, cortical bone growth and regulation of trabecular bone structure is a result of DNA-binding-dependent actions of the AR in females.

Moreover, the importance of understanding female androgen receptors lies in their role in several genetic disorders including androgen insensitivity syndrome (AIS). Complete (CAIS) and partial (PAIS) which are a result of mutations in the genes that code for AR. These mutations cause the inactivation of AR due to mutations conferring resistance to circulating testosterone, with more than 400 different AR mutations reported.

=== Mechanism of action ===
==== Genomic ====
The primary mechanism of action for androgen receptors is direct regulation of gene transcription.

Androgens (also called androgenic hormones), such as testosterone or dihydrotestosterone, are understood to exert their primary effects through binding to an androgen receptor in the cytosol. The receptor is translocated to the nucleus upon androgen binding and ultimately results in the transcriptional regulation of a number of genes via androgen responsive elements. This androgen response mechanism is perhaps best known and characterized in the context of male sexual differentiation and puberty, but plays a role in a variety of tissue types and processes. Upon binding to androgens, the androgen receptor dissociates from accessory proteins, translocates into the nucleus, dimerizes, and then stimulates transcription of androgen-responsive genes.

The binding of an androgen to the androgen receptor results in a conformational change in the receptor that, in turn, causes dissociation of heat shock proteins, transport from the cytosol into the cell nucleus, and dimerization. The androgen receptor dimer binds to a specific sequence of DNA known as a hormone response element, where it forms macromolecular protein condensates that might facilitate rapid gene regulation as consequence of local high protein concentrations together with other coregulators. Androgen receptors interact with other proteins in the nucleus, resulting in up- or down-regulation of specific gene transcription. Up-regulation or activation of transcription results in increased synthesis of messenger RNA, which, in turn, is translated by ribosomes to produce specific proteins. One of the known target genes of androgen receptor activation is the insulin-like growth factor 1 receptor (IGF-1R). Thus, changes in levels of specific proteins in cells is one way that androgen receptors control cell behavior.

One function of androgen receptor that is independent of direct binding to its target DNA sequence is facilitated by recruitment via other DNA-binding proteins. One example is serum response factor, a protein that activates several genes that cause muscle growth.

Androgen receptor is modified by post-translational modification through acetylation, which directly promotes AR-mediated transactivation, apoptosis and contact-independent growth of prostate cancer cells. AR acetylation is induced by androgens and determines recruitment into chromatin. The AR acetylation site is a key target of NAD-dependent and TSA-dependent histone deacetylases and long non-coding RNA.

==== Non-genomic ====
More recently, androgen receptors have been shown to have a second mode of action. As has been also found for other steroid hormone receptors such as estrogen receptors, androgen receptors can have actions that are independent of their interactions with DNA. Androgen receptors interact with certain signal transduction proteins in the cytoplasm. Androgen binding to cytoplasmic androgen receptors can cause rapid changes in cell function independent of changes in gene transcription, such as changes in ion transport. Regulation of signal transduction pathways by cytoplasmic androgen receptors can indirectly lead to changes in gene transcription, for example, by leading to phosphorylation of other transcription factors.

== Genetics ==
=== Gene ===
In humans, the androgen receptor is encoded by the AR gene located on the X chromosome at Xq11–12.

=== Deficiencies ===
At least 165 disease-causing mutations in this gene have been discovered. The androgen insensitivity syndrome, formerly known as testicular feminization, is caused by a mutation in the androgen receptor gene on the X chromosome (locus: Xq11–Xq12). The androgen receptor seems to affect neuron physiology and is defective in Kennedy's disease. In addition, point mutations and trinucleotide repeat polymorphisms have been linked to a number of additional disorders.

=== CAG repeats ===
The AR gene contains CAG repeats that affect receptor function, where fewer repeats leads to increased receptor sensitivity to circulating androgens and more repeats leads to decreased receptor sensitivity. Studies have shown that racial variation in CAG repeats exists, with African-Americans having fewer repeats than non-Hispanic white Americans. The racial trends in CAG repeats parallels the incidence and mortality of prostate cancer in these two groups.

=== Mutations ===
The enhancer and the gene encoding for these receptors contain recurrent mutations, such as structural rearrangements and copy number changes, acquired in the progression of metastatic castration-resistant prostate cancer (mCRPC) treatment with therapy targeting these receptors (abiraterone, enzalutamide), make the disease progression determined by the androgen receptor genotype.

== Structure ==
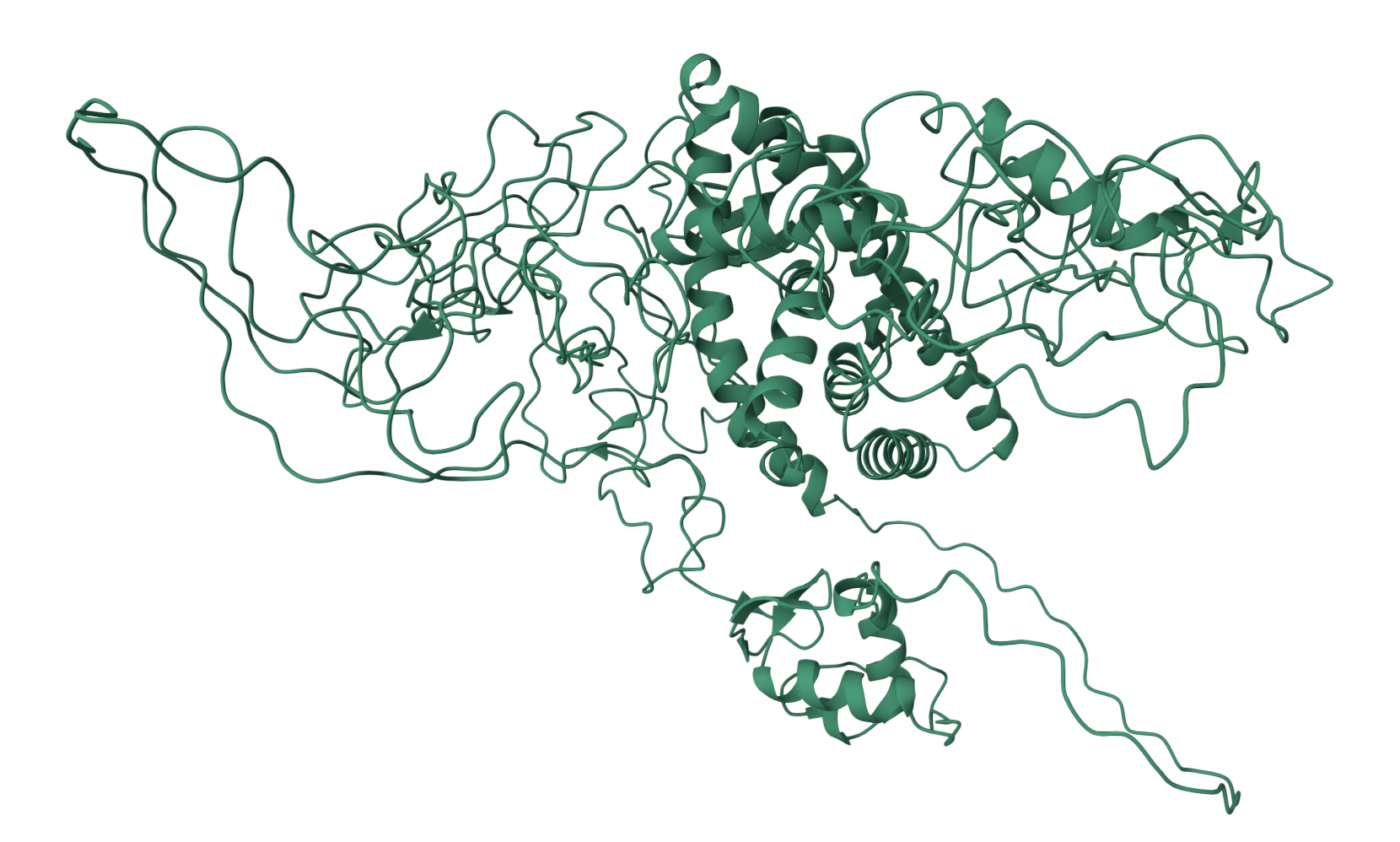
Structure of full length human androgen receptor including N-terminal domain, DNA binding domain, and Ligand binding domain. Corresponding PDB file is available at Sheikhhassani et al.

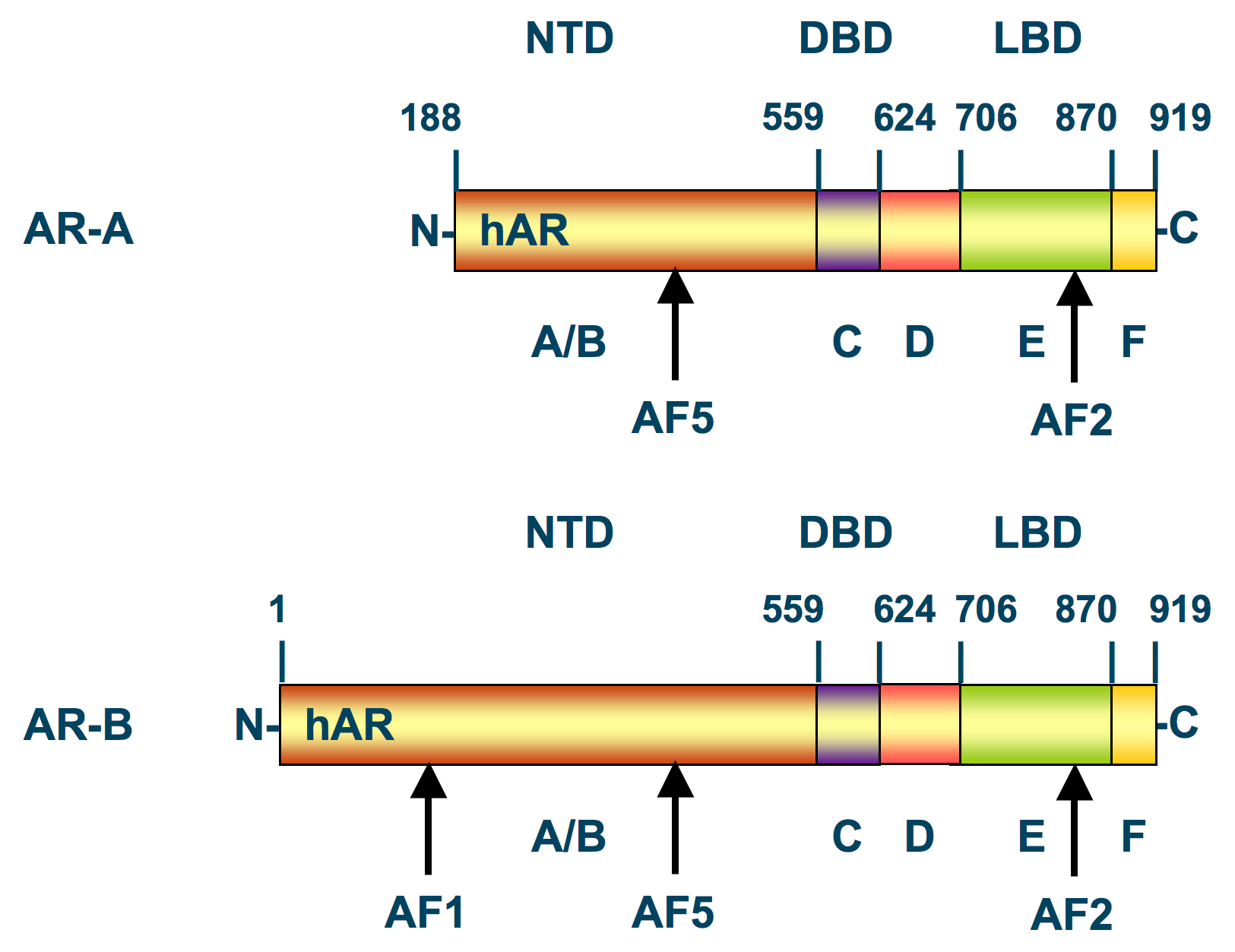
Structural domains of the two isoforms (AR-A and AR-B) of the human androgen receptor. Numbers above the bars refer to the amino acid residues that separate the domains starting from the N-terminus (left) to C-terminus (right). NTD = N-terminal domain, DBD = DNA-binding domain, LBD = ligand-binding domain, AF = activation function.

=== Isoforms ===
Two isoforms of the androgen receptor (A and B) have been identified:

- AR-A – 87 kDa; N-terminus truncated (lacks the first 187 amino acids), which results from in vitro proteolysis.
- AR-B – 110 kDa; full length

=== Domains ===
Like other nuclear receptors, the androgen receptor is modular in structure and is composed of the following functional domains labeled A through F:

- A/B) – N-terminal is a regulatory domain which is intrinsically disordered and contains several key motifs/segments:
  - Dimerization surface involving residues 1–36, the ^{23}FQNLF^{27} motif (B only) nd 370–494, both of which interact with the ligand binding domain (LBD) in an intramolecular head-to-tail interaction
    - FXXLF motif; where F = phenylalanine, L = leucine, and X = any amino acid residue a
  - Polyglutamine repeat (AR-B only)
  - Transactivation unit 1 (TAU-1) between residues 101 and 370 required for full ligand-activated transcriptional activity
  - Transactivation unit 5 (TAU-5) between residues 360–485 is responsible for the constitutive activity (activity without bound ligand)

Despite being highly disordered, the NTD domain adopts a 3D conformation in which two dynamically compact regions form, an N-terminal region (NR) and a C-terminal region (CR), each having distinct topological dynamics and function.

- C) – DNA binding domain (DBD)
  - Contains two Zinc fingers
- D) – Hinge region; flexible region that connects the DBD with the LBD; along with the DBD, contains a ligand dependent nuclear localization signal
- E) – Ligand binding domain (LBD) containing
  - activation function 2 (AF-2), responsible for agonist induced activity (activity in the presence of bound agonist)
  - AF-2 binds either the N-terminal FXXFL motif intramolecularly or coactivator proteins (containing the LXXLL or preferably FXXFL motifs)
  - A ligand dependent nuclear export signal
- F) – C-terminal domain

=== Splice variants ===
AR-V7 is an androgen receptor splice variant that can be detected in circulating tumor cells of metastatic prostate cancer patients and is predictive of resistance to some drugs (caused by missing Ligand-binding domain in this splice variant).

== Clinical significance ==
High expression in androgen receptor has been linked to aggression and sex drive by affecting the HPA and HPG axis

Aberrant androgen receptor coregulator activity may contribute to the progression of prostate cancer.

== Ligands ==
Affinities (Note: At androgen receptors; measured in human prostate tissue.)
Compound	RBA (Note: Relative to Metribolone, which is by definition 100%)
Metribolone	100
Dihydrotestosterone	85
Cyproterone acetate	7.8
Bicalutamide	1.4
Nilutamide	0.9
Hydroxyflutamide	0.57
Flutamide	<0.0057

=== Agonists ===
- Endogenous androgens (e.g., testosterone, dihydrotestosterone, androstenedione, androstenediol, dehydroepiandrosterone)
- Synthetic androgens (e.g., methyltestosterone, metandienone, nandrolone, trenbolone, oxandrolone, stanozolol)

=== Mixed ===
- Selective androgen receptor modulators (e.g., andarine, enobosarm)

=== Antagonists ===
- Steroidal antiandrogens (e.g., cyproterone acetate, chlormadinone acetate, spironolactone, oxendolone)
- Nonsteroidal antiandrogens (e.g., flutamide, nilutamide, bicalutamide, enzalutamide, apalutamide, RU-58841)
- N-Terminal domain antiandrogens (e.g., bisphenol A, EPI-001, ralaniten, JN compounds)

== As a drug target ==
The AR is an important therapeutic target in prostate cancer. Thus many different antiandrogens have been developed, primarily targeting the ligand-binding domain of the protein. AR ligands can either be classified based on their structure (steroidal or nonsteroidal) or based on their ability to activate or inhibit transcription (agonists or antagonists). Inhibitors that target alternative functional domains (N-terminal domain, DNA-binding domain) of the protein are still under development.

=== Drug resistance ===
Alteration of ARs may lead to treatment resistance (castration resistance) in prostate cancer as there may be missense mutations of the ligand binding domain, amplifications of the gene coding for this receptor or in its enhancer, mostly, suggesting the presence of different subclones with different genotypes of these receptors.

== Interactions ==
Androgen receptor has been shown to interact with:

- AKT1,
- BAG1,
- Beta-catenin,
- BRCA1,
- C-jun,
- Calmodulin 1,
- Caveolin 1,
- CDK9,
- COX5B,
- CREB-binding protein,
- Cyclin D1,
- Cyclin-dependent kinase 7,
- DACH1,
- Death associated protein 6,
- L-DOPA,
- EFCAB6,
- Epidermal growth factor receptor,
- FOXO1,
- GAPDH,
- Gelsolin,
- GNB2L1,
- GSK3B,
- HDAC1,
- HSP90AA1,
- HTATIP,
- MAGEA11,
- MED1,
- MYST2,
- NCOA1,
- NCOA2,
- NCOA3,
- NCOA4,
- NCOA6,
- NCOR2,
- NONO,
- p300,
- PA2G4,
- PAK6,
- PATZ1,
- PIAS2,
- PRPF6,
- PTEN,
- RAD9A,
- RANBP9,
- RCHY1,
- Retinoblastoma protein,
- RNF14,
- RNF4,
- SART3,
- SIRT1,
- SMAD3,
- Small heterodimer partner,
- Src,
- SRY,
- STAT3,
- SVIL,
- Testicular receptor 2,
- Testicular receptor 4,
- TGFB1I1,
- TMF1,
- TRIM68,
- UBE2I,
- UXT, and
- ZMIZ1.

== See also ==
- Membrane androgen receptor
- Discovery and development of antiandrogens
