= PAK6 =

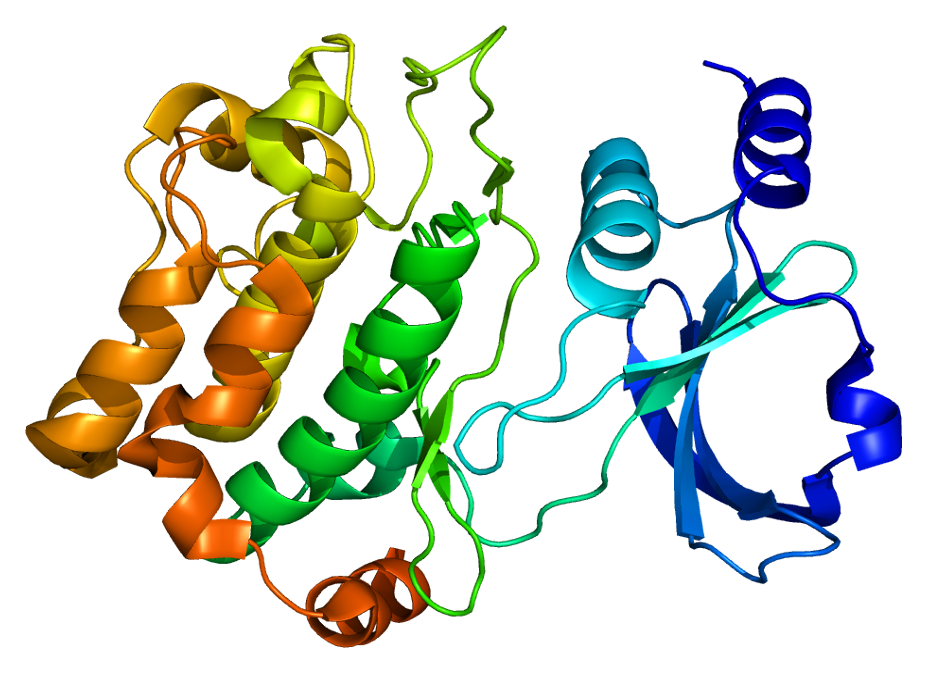

Identifiers
- Aliases: PAK6, PAK5, p21 (RAC1) activated kinase 6
- External IDs: OMIM: 608110; MGI: 2679420; GeneCards: PAK6
Available structures
PDB	Ortholog search: PDBe RCSB
PDB	List of PDB id codes 2C30, 2ODB, 4KS8
Enzyme activity
EC #	BRENDA	ExPASy	KEGG	MetaCyc
2.7.11.1	↗	↗	↗	↗

Gene location (Human)
Chr.	Chromosome 15 (human)
Band	15q15.1	Start	40,217,428 bp
Band	15q15.1	End	40,277,487 bp

Gene location (Mouse)
Chr.	Chromosome 2 (mouse)
Band	2|2 E5	Start	118,493,784 bp
Band	2|2 E5	End	118,528,501 bp
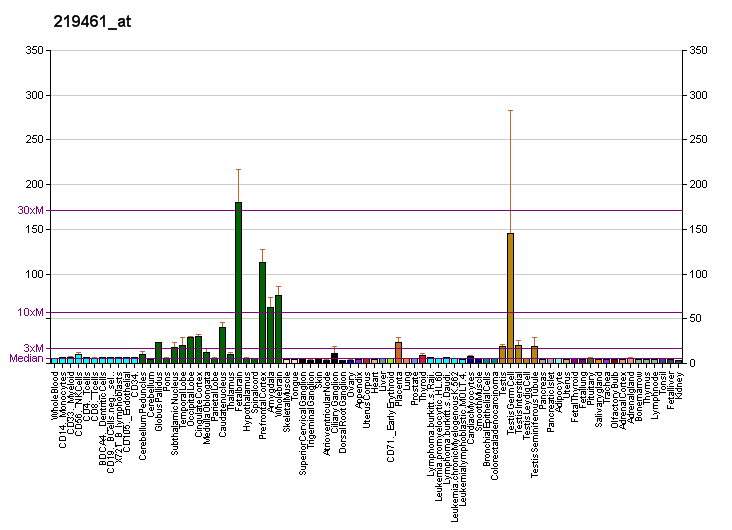
RNA expression pattern
Bgee	Human / Mouse (ortholog); Top expressed in: gingival epithelium; entorhinal cortex; right frontal lobe; skin of thigh; prefrontal cortex; postcentral gyrus; mucosa of esophagus; skin of abdomen; superior frontal gyrus; anterior cingulate cortex / Top expressed in: lumbar subsegment of spinal cord; dentate gyrus of hippocampal formation granule cell; piriform cortex; superior frontal gyrus; primary visual cortex; lip; Region I of hippocampus proper; olfactory tubercle; cingulate gyrus; lateral septal nucleus; More reference expression data
BioGPS	More reference expression data
Gene ontology
Molecular function	transferase activity; nucleotide binding; protein kinase activity; kinase activity; protein binding; ATP binding; cadherin binding; protein serine/threonine kinase activity
Cellular component	cytoplasm; fibrillar center; nucleus; cell junction
Biological process	regulation of transcription, DNA-templated; phosphorylation; protein phosphorylation; cytoskeleton organization; apoptotic process; Rho protein signal transduction; regulation of mitotic cell cycle; cell migration; signal transduction; actin cytoskeleton organization; stress-activated protein kinase signaling cascade; activation of protein kinase activity; regulation of apoptotic process; regulation of MAPK cascade
Sources:Amigo / QuickGO
Orthologs
Databases	NCBI: entry; OMA: entry
Species	Human	Mouse
Entrez	56924	214230
Ensembl	ENSG00000137843	ENSMUSG00000074923
UniProt	Q9NQU5	Q3ULB5
RefSeq (mRNA)	NM_020168; NM_001276717; NM_001276718; NM_001395430; NM_001395431	NM_001033254; NM_001145854
RefSeq (protein)	NP_001122100; NP_001122101	NP_001028426; NP_001139326
Location (UCSC)	Chr 15: 40.22 – 40.28 Mb	Chr 2: 118.49 – 118.53 Mb
PubMed search
- Wikidata
View/Edit Human	View/Edit Mouse

Serine/threonine-protein kinase PAK 6 is an enzyme that in humans is encoded by the PAK6 gene.

PAK6 belongs to the Group II PAK family members. Like other family members, PAK6 is also evolutionary conserved across species.

== Discovery ==
The PAK6 was originally cloned as an androgen receptor interacting kinase which can be stimulated by androgen receptor but not Rac or Cdc42, like other family members.

== Gene and spliced variants ==
The human PAK6 gene consists of 16 exons of which 8 exons are used for 5'-UTR splicing to generating 17 transcripts by alternative splicing, and the gene is about 38-kb long. Among PAK6 transcripts, 14 are protein coding RNAs to code four proteins of 681 and 636 amino acids while remaining PAK6 transcripts are non-coding RNAs. There are five transcripts in murine PAK6 gene, of which two transcripts are protein coding and other two non-coding RNAs(Gene from review).

== Protein domains ==
Following the general structural organization of the group II PAKs, PAK6 also contains a kinase, and a GTPase interacting domain.

== Function ==
This gene encodes a protein that shares a high degree of sequence similarity with p21-activated kinase (PAK) family members. The proteins of this family are Rac/Cdc42-associated Ste20-like Ser/Thr protein kinases, characterized by a highly conserved amino-terminal Cdc42/Rac interactive binding (CRIB) domain and a carboxyl-terminal kinase domain. PAK kinases are implicated in the regulation of a number of cellular processes, including cytoskeleton rearrangement, apoptosis and the MAP kinase signaling pathway. The protein encoded by this gene was found to interact with androgen receptor (AR), which is a steroid hormone-dependent transcription factor that is important for male sexual differentiation and development. The p21-activated protein kinase 6 gene was found to be highly expressed in testis and prostate tissues and the encoded protein was shown to cotranslocate into the nucleus with AR in response to androgen.

Genetic deletion of PAK6 alone in mice leads to increased body mass. However, PAK6 deletion along with PAK5 impairs the ability of animals to learn and move. PAK6 expression is increased in a rat model of spinal cord injury. PAK6 is also considered a candidate gene for epileptic encephalopathy, and interacts with Parkinson associated gene product leucine-rich repeat kinase 2. PAK6 expression has been found to be overexpressed in prostate cancer, hepatocellular carcinoma, and colon cancer. PAK6 levels have been correlated well with therapeutic resistance to 5-flurouracil, docetaxel, and radiation.

== Regulators and interactors ==
PAK6 kinase activity is positively regulated by androgen receptor, p38MAPK, 5-fluorouracil and atypical Rho family GTPase Chp/RhoV. PAK6 expression is negatively regulated by miR-328, miR-429 and miR-23a. PAK6 interacts with junctional protein IQGAP1, E3 ligase Mdm2, and leucine-rich repeat kinase 2 (LRRK2).

== Interactions ==
PAK6 has been shown to interact with Androgen receptor.
