= UXT =

Protein-coding gene in the species Homo sapiens

Identifiers
- Aliases: UXT, ART-27, STAP1, ubiquitously expressed prefoldin like chaperone
- External IDs: OMIM: 300234; MGI: 1277988; GeneCards: UXT

Gene location (Human)
Chr.	X chromosome (human)
Band	Xp11.23	Start	47,651,796 bp
Band	Xp11.23	End	47,659,180 bp

Gene location (Mouse)
Chr.	X chromosome (mouse)
Band	X|X A1.3	Start	20,807,961 bp
Band	X|X A1.3	End	20,828,256 bp
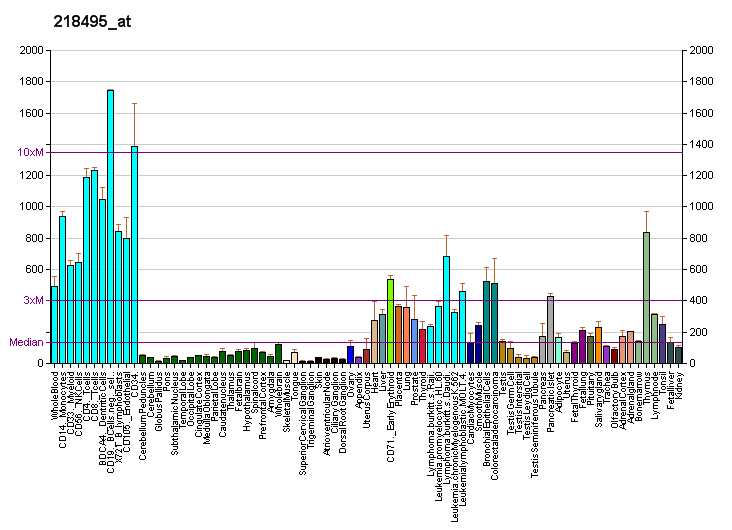
RNA expression pattern
Bgee	Human / Mouse (ortholog); Top expressed in: left ovary; body of pancreas; granulocyte; right ovary; ganglionic eminence; skin of abdomen; skin of leg; lymph node; left adrenal cortex; body of stomach / Top expressed in: quadriceps femoris muscle; lens; proximal tubule; right kidney; white adipose tissue; embryo; heart; muscle tissue; pancreas; epiblast; More reference expression data
BioGPS	More reference expression data
Gene ontology
Molecular function	microtubule binding; actin filament binding; transcription corepressor activity; chromatin binding; protein binding; beta-tubulin binding; transcription coregulator activity
Cellular component	cytoplasm; centrosome; gamma-tubulin complex; cytoskeleton; nucleus; microtubule organizing center; spindle pole; nucleoplasm; chromatin
Biological process	mitochondrion transport along microtubule; regulation of transcription, DNA-templated; negative regulation of transcription by RNA polymerase II; microtubule cytoskeleton organization; transcription, DNA-templated; centrosome cycle; apoptotic process; negative regulation of G0 to G1 transition
Sources:Amigo / QuickGO
Orthologs
Databases	NCBI: entry; OMA: entry
Species	Human	Mouse
Entrez	8409	22294
Ensembl	ENSG00000126756	ENSMUSG00000001134
UniProt	Q9UBK9	Q9WTZ0
RefSeq (mRNA)	NM_004182; NM_153477	NM_013840
RefSeq (protein)	NP_004173; NP_705582	NP_038868; NP_038868
Location (UCSC)	Chr X: 47.65 – 47.66 Mb	Chr X: 20.81 – 20.83 Mb
PubMed search
- Wikidata
View/Edit Human	View/Edit Mouse

Protein UXT (Ubiquitously eXpressed Transcript protein) also known as androgen receptor trapped clone 27 (ART-27) protein is a protein that in humans is encoded by the UXT gene.

== Function ==
UXT interacts with the N-terminus of the androgen receptor and plays a role in facilitating receptor-induced transcriptional activation. It is also likely to be involved in tumorigenesis as it is abundantly expressed in tumor tissues. This gene is part of a gene cluster on chromosome Xp11.23. Alternative splicing results in 2 transcript variants encoding different isoforms.

Transcript variant 2 is 575 bp in length, and it codes for a polypeptide sequence that is 157 amino acids long (~ 18 kDa). It has been shown to interact with two AR N-terminal activation domains that are both required for full transcriptional activation. In addition, it is largely localized to the nucleus and is highly expressed in human prostate epithelial cells as well as breast tissues. ART-27 likely serves to link AR to a larger transcription factor complex as evidenced by its association with a number of proteins including RNA pol II subunit 5, a pair of prefoldin β-subunits, and TATA-binding protein-interacting proteins. It also shows homology to prefoldins which are small molecular weight proteins that assemble into molecular chaperone complexes to affect protein folding.

ART-27 is shown to be subject to both cell type and developmental regulation in humans. Its expression is associated with an abundance of differentiated prostate epithelial cells, and regulated expression in prostate cancer cells results in decreased cell proliferation. Significantly, because decreased levels of ART-27 are consistently found in prostate cancer cells, it likely plays a role in promoting epithelial differentiation via suppression of proliferative pathways. More recent studies have more definitively identified ART-27 as a corepressor of AR. The fact that the increase in gene transcription exhibited upon ART-27 depletion requires the presence of AR implies that it specifically functions as a corepressor of this receptor. Despite the lack of information regarding its mechanisms of suppression, ART-27 likely plays multiple roles that inhibit AR-mediated transcription. In the absence of androgens, ART-27 may bind the AR N terminus and thereby prevent AR-dependent activation of genes involved in cell proliferation. Other mechanisms may include recruitment of ART-27 to AREs or inhibition of histone methylation which otherwise allows for increased transcription of target genes.

== Interactions ==
UXT has been shown to interact with Androgen receptor.
