= Eukaryotic transcription =

Transcription is heterocatalytic function of DNA

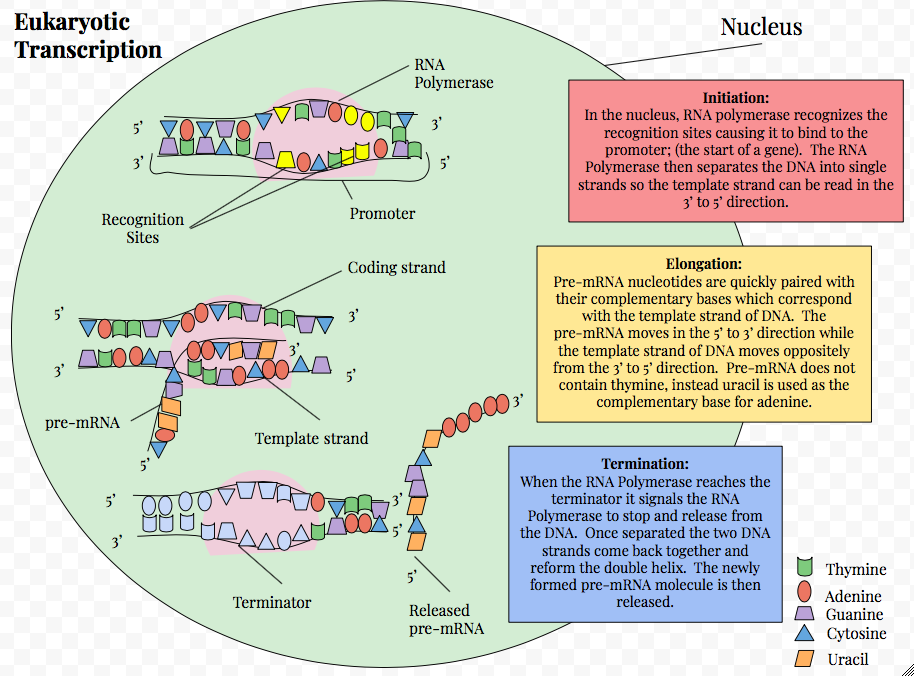
Eukaryotic Transcription

Eukaryotic transcription is the elaborate process that eukaryotic cells use to copy genetic information stored in DNA into units of transportable complementary RNA replica. Gene transcription occurs in both eukaryotic and prokaryotic cells. Unlike prokaryotic RNA polymerase that initiates the transcription of all different types of RNA, RNA polymerase in eukaryotes (including humans) comes in three variations, each translating a different type of gene. A eukaryotic cell has a nucleus that separates the processes of transcription and translation. Eukaryotic transcription occurs within the nucleus where DNA is packaged into nucleosomes and higher order chromatin structures. The complexity of the eukaryotic genome necessitates a great variety and complexity of gene expression control.

Eukaryotic transcription proceeds in three sequential stages: initiation, elongation, and termination.

The RNAs transcribed serve diverse functions. For example, structural components of the ribosome are transcribed by RNA polymerase I. Protein coding genes are transcribed by RNA polymerase II into messenger RNAs (mRNAs) that carry the information from DNA to the site of protein synthesis. More abundantly made are the so-called non-coding RNAs account for the large majority of the transcriptional output of a cell. These non-coding RNAs perform a variety of important cellular functions.

== RNA polymerase ==
Eukaryotes have three nuclear RNA polymerases, each with distinct roles and properties.

Name	Location	Product
RNA Polymerase I (Pol I, Pol A)	nucleolus	larger ribosomal RNA (rRNA) (28S, 18S, 5.8S)
RNA Polymerase II (Pol II, Pol B)	nucleus	messenger RNA (mRNA), most small nuclear RNAs (snRNAs), small interfering RNA (siRNAs) and microRNA (miRNA).
RNA Polymerase III (Pol III, Pol C)	nucleus (and possibly the nucleolus-nucleoplasm interface)	transfer RNA (tRNA), other small RNAs (including the small 5S ribosomal RNA (5s rRNA), snRNA U6, signal recognition particle RNA (SRP RNA) and other stable short RNAs

RNA polymerase I (Pol I) catalyses the transcription of all rRNA genes except 5S. These rRNA genes are organised into a single transcriptional unit and are transcribed into a continuous transcript. This precursor is then processed into three rRNAs: 18S, 5.8S, and 28S. The transcription of rRNA genes takes place in a specialised structure of the nucleus called the nucleolus, where the transcribed rRNAs are combined with proteins to form ribosomes.

RNA polymerase II (Pol II) is responsible for the transcription of all mRNAs, some snRNAs, siRNAs, and all miRNAs. Many Pol II transcripts exist transiently as single strand precursor RNAs (pre-RNAs) that are further processed to generate mature RNAs. For example, precursor mRNAs (pre-mRNAs) are extensively processed before exiting into the cytoplasm through the nuclear pore for protein translation.

RNA polymerase III (Pol III) transcribes small non-coding RNAs, including tRNAs, 5S rRNA, U6 snRNA, SRP RNA, and other stable short RNAs such as ribonuclease P RNA.

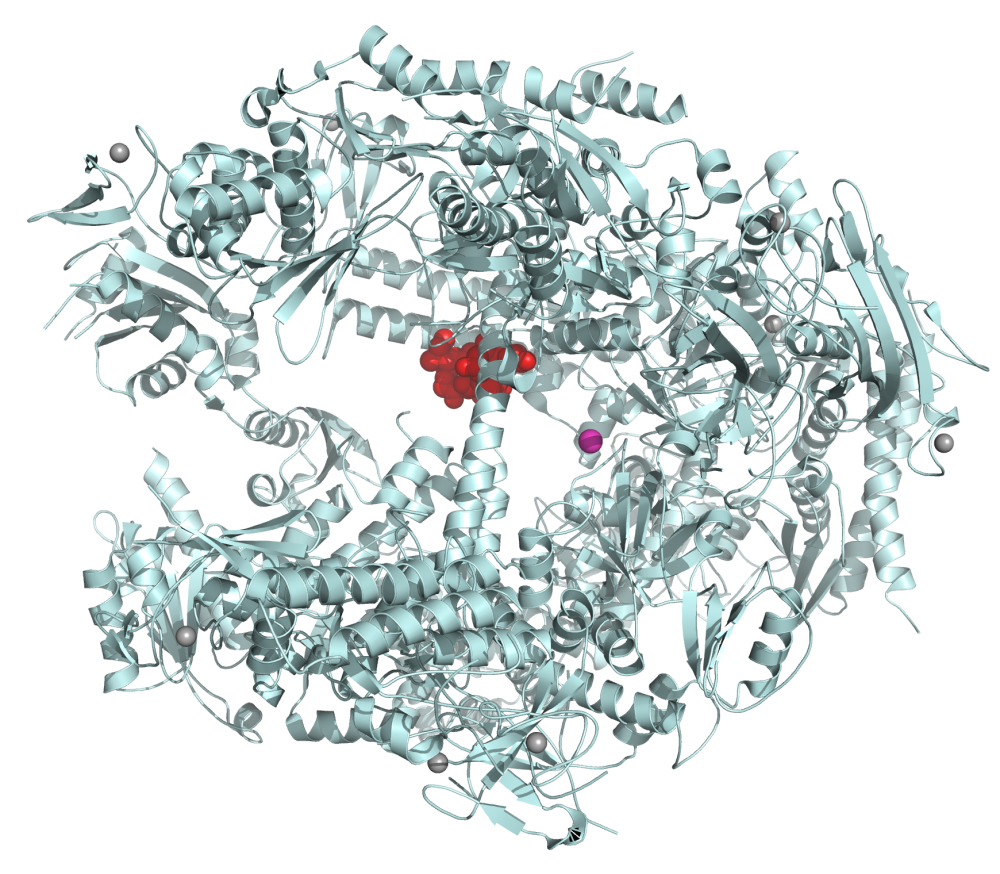
Structure of eukaryotic RNA polymerase II (light blue) in complex with α-amanitin (red), a strong poison found in death cap mushrooms that targets this vital enzyme

RNA Polymerases I, II, and III contain 14, 12, and 17 subunits, respectively. All three eukaryotic polymerases have five core subunits that exhibit homology with the β, β', α^{I}, α^{II}, and ω subunits of E. coli RNA polymerase. An identical ω-like subunit (RBP6) is used by all three eukaryotic polymerases, while the same α-like subunits are used by Pol I and III. The three eukaryotic polymerases share four other common subunits among themselves. The remaining subunits are unique to each RNA polymerase. The additional subunits found in Pol I and Pol III relative to Pol II, are homologous to Pol II transcription factors.

Crystal structures of RNA polymerases I and II provide an opportunity to understand the interactions among the subunits and the molecular mechanism of eukaryotic transcription in atomic detail.

The carboxyl terminal domain (CTD) of RPB1, the largest subunit of RNA polymerase II, plays an important role in bringing together the machinery necessary for the synthesis and processing of Pol II transcripts. Long and structurally disordered, the CTD contains multiple repeats of heptapeptide sequence YSPTSPS that are subject to phosphorylation and other posttranslational modifications during the transcription cycle. These modifications and their regulation constitute the operational code for the CTD to control transcription initiation, elongation and termination and to couple transcription and RNA processing.

== Initiation ==
The initiation of gene transcription in eukaryotes occurs in specific steps. First, an RNA polymerase along with general transcription factors binds to the promoter region of the gene to form a closed complex called the preinitiation complex. The subsequent transition of the complex from the closed state to the open state results in the melting or separation of the two DNA strands and the positioning of the template strand to the active site of the RNA polymerase. Without the need of a primer, RNA polymerase can initiate the synthesis of a new RNA chain using the template DNA strand to guide ribonucleotide selection and polymerization chemistry. However, many of the initiated syntheses are aborted before the transcripts reach a significant length (~10 nucleotides). During these abortive cycles, the polymerase keeps making and releasing short transcripts until it is able to produce a transcript that surpasses ten nucleotides in length. Once this threshold is attained, RNA polymerase passes the promoter and transcription proceeds to the elongation phase.

Here is a diagram of the attachment of RNA polymerase II to the de-helicized DNA. Credit: Forluvoft.

=== Eukaryotic promoters and general transcription factors ===
Pol II-transcribed genes contain a region in the immediate vicinity of the transcription start site (TSS) that binds and positions the preinitiation complex. This region is called the core promoter because of its essential role in transcription initiation. Different classes of sequence elements are found in the promoters. For example, the TATA box is the highly conserved DNA recognition sequence for the TATA box binding protein, TBP, whose binding initiates transcription complex assembly at many genes.

Eukaryotic genes also contain regulatory sequences beyond the core promoter. These cis-acting control elements bind transcriptional activators or repressors to increase or decrease transcription from the core promoter. Well-characterized regulatory elements include enhancers, silencers, and insulators. These regulatory sequences can be spread over a large genomic distance, sometimes located hundreds of kilobases from the core promoters.

General transcription factors are a group of proteins involved in transcription initiation and regulation. These factors typically have DNA-binding domains that bind specific sequence elements of the core promoter and help recruit RNA polymerase to the transcriptional start site. General transcription factors for RNA polymerase II include TFIID, TFIIA, TFIIB, TFIIF, TFIIE, and TFIIH.

=== Assembly of preinitiation complex ===
The transcription, a complete set of general transcription factors and RNA polymerase need to be assembled at the core promoter to form the ~2.5 million Dalton preinitiation complex. For example, for promoters that contain a TATA box near the TSS, the recognition of TATA box by the TBP subunit of TFIID initiates the assembly of a transcription complex. The next proteins to enter are TFIIA and TFIIB, which stabilize the DNA-TFIID complex and recruit Pol II in association with TFIIF and additional transcription factors. TFIIB serves as the bridge between the TATA-bound TBP and the RNA polymerase. It also helps to place the active centre of the polymerase in the correct position to initiate transcription. One of the last transcription factors to be recruited to the preinitiation complex is TFIIH, which plays an important role in promoter melting and escape.

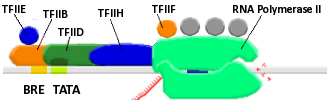
The diagram describes the eukaryotic preinitiation complex which includes the general transcription factors and RNA Polymerase II. Credit: ArneLH.

=== Promoter melting and open complex formation ===
For pol II-transcribed genes, and unlike bacterial RNA polymerase, promoter melting requires hydrolysis of ATP and is mediated by TFIIH. TFIIH is a ten-subunit protein, including both ATPase and protein kinase activities. While the upstream promoter DNA is held in a fixed position by TFIID, TFIIH pulls downstream double-stranded DNA into the cleft of the polymerase, driving the separation of DNA strands and the transition of the preinitiation complex from the closed to open state. TFIIB aids in open complex formation by binding the melted DNA and stabilizing the transcription bubble.

=== Abortive initiation ===
Once the initiation complex is open, the first ribonucleotide is brought into the active site to initiate the polymerization reaction in the absence of a primer. This generates a nascent RNA chain that forms a hetero-duplex with the template DNA strand. However, before entering the elongation phase, polymerase may terminate prematurely and release a short, truncated transcript. This process is called abortive initiation. Many cycles of abortive initiation may occur before the transcript grows to sufficient length to promote polymerase escape from the promoter. Throughout abortive initiation cycles, RNA polymerase remains bound to the promoter and pulls downstream DNA into its catalytic cleft in a scrunching-kind of motion.

=== Promoter escape ===
When a transcript attains the threshold length of ten nucleotides, it enters the RNA exit channel. The polymerase breaks its interactions with the promoter elements and any regulatory proteins associated with the initiation complex that it no longer needs. Promoter escape in eukaryotes requires ATP hydrolysis and, in the case of Pol II-phosphorylation of the CTD. Meanwhile, the transcription bubble collapses down to 12-14 nucleotides, providing kinetic energy required for the escape.

== Elongation ==
After escaping the promoter and shedding most of the transcription factors for initiation, the polymerase acquires new factors for the next phase of transcription: elongation. Transcription elongation is a processive process. Double stranded DNA that enters from the front of the enzyme is unzipped to avail the template strand for RNA synthesis. For every DNA base pair separated by the advancing polymerase, one hybrid RNA:DNA base pair is immediately formed. DNA strands and nascent RNA chain exit from separate channels; the two DNA strands reunite at the trailing end of the transcription bubble while the single strand RNA emerges alone.

=== Elongation factors ===
Among the proteins recruited to polymerase are elongation factors, thus called because they stimulate transcription elongation. There are different classes of elongation factors. Some factors can increase the overall rate of transcribing, some can help the polymerase through transient pausing sites, and some can assist the polymerase to transcribe through chromatin. One of the elongation factors, P-TEFb, is particularly important. P-TEFb phosphorylates the second residue (Ser-2) of the CTD repeats (YSPTSPS) of the bound Pol II. P-TEFb also phosphorylates and activates SPT5 and TAT-SF1. SPT5 is a universal transcription factor that helps recruit 5'-capping enzyme to Pol II with a CTD phosphorylated at Ser-5. TAF-SF1 recruits components of the RNA splicing machinery to the Ser-2 phosphorylated CTD. P-TEFb also helps suppress transient pausing of polymerase when it encounters certain sequences immediately following initiation.

=== Transcription fidelity ===
Transcription fidelity is achieved through multiple mechanisms. RNA polymerases select correct nucleoside triphosphate (NTP) substrate to prevent transcription errors. Only the NTP which correctly base pairs with the coding base in the DNA is admitted to the active center. RNA polymerase performs two known proof reading functions to detect and remove misincorporated nucleotides: pyrophosphorylytic editing and hydrolytic editing. The former removes the incorrectly inserted ribonucleotide by a simple reversal of the polymerization reaction, while the latter involves backtracking of the polymerase and cleaving of a segment of error-containing RNA product. Elongation factor TFIIS (InterPro: IPR006289; TCEA1, TCEA2, TCEA3) stimulates an inherent ribonuclease activity in the polymerase, allowing the removal of misincorporated bases through limited local RNA degradation. Note that all reactions (phosphodiester bond synthesis, pyrophosphorolysis, phosphodiester bond hydrolysis) are performed by RNA polymerase by using a single active center.

=== Pausing, poising, and backtracking ===
Transcription elongation is not a smooth ride along double stranded DNA, as RNA polymerase undergoes extensive co-transcriptional pausing during transcription elongation. In general, RNA polymerase II does not transcribe through a gene at a constant pace. Rather it pauses periodically at certain sequences, sometimes for long periods of time before resuming transcription. This pausing is especially pronounced at nucleosomes, and arises in part through the polymerase entering a transcriptionally incompetent backtracked state. The duration of these pauses ranges from seconds to minutes or longer, and exit from long-lived pauses can be promoted by elongation factors such as TFIIS.

This pausing is also sometimes used for proofreading; here the polymerase backs up, erases some of the RNA it has already made and has another go at transcription. In extreme cases, for example, when the polymerase encounters a damaged nucleotide, it comes to a complete halt. More often, an elongating polymerase is stalled near the promoter. Promoter-proximal pausing during early elongation is a commonly used mechanism for regulating genes poised to be expressed rapidly or in a coordinated fashion. Pausing is mediated by a complex called NELF (negative elongation factor) in collaboration with DSIF (DRB-sensitivity-inducing factor containing SPT4/SPT5). The blockage is released once the polymerase receives an activation signal, such as the phosphorylation of Ser-2 of CTD tail by P-TEFb. Other elongation factors such as ELL and TFIIS stimulate the rate of elongation by limiting the length of time that polymerase pauses.

=== RNA processing ===
Elongating polymerase is associated with a set of protein factors required for various types of RNA processing. mRNA is capped as soon as it emerges from the RNA-exit channel of the polymerase. After capping, dephosphorylation of Ser-5 within the CTD repeats may be responsible for dissociation of the capping machinery. Further phosphorylation of Ser-2 causes recruitment of the RNA splicing machinery that catalyzes the removal of non-coding introns to generate mature mRNA. Alternative splicing expands the protein complements in eukaryotes. Just as with 5'-capping and splicing, the CTD tail is involved in recruiting enzymes responsible for 3'-polyadenylation, the final RNA processing event that is coupled with the termination of transcription.

== Termination ==
The last stage of transcription is termination, which leads to the dissociation of the complete transcript and the release of RNA polymerase from the template DNA.The process differs for each of the three RNA polymerases. The mechanism of termination is the least understood of the three transcription stages.

=== Factor-dependent ===
The termination of transcription of pre-rRNA genes by polymerase Pol I is performed by a system that needs a specific transcription termination factor. The mechanism used bears some resemblance to the rho-dependent termination in prokaryotes. Eukaryotic cells contain hundreds of ribosomal DNA repeats, sometimes distributed over multiple chromosomes. Termination of transcription occurs in the ribosomal intergenic spacer region that contains several transcription termination sites upstream of a Pol I pausing site. Through a yet unknown mechanism, the 3'-end of the transcript is cleaved, generating a large primary rRNA molecule that is further processed into the mature 18S, 5.8S and 28S rRNAs.

As Pol II reaches the end of a gene, two protein complexes carried by the CTD, CPSF (cleavage and polyadenylation specificity factor) and CSTF (cleavage stimulation factor), recognize the poly-A signal in the transcribed RNA. Poly-A-bound CPSF and CSTF recruit other proteins to carry out RNA cleavage and then polyadenylation. Poly-A polymerase adds approximately 200 adenines to the cleaved 3' end of the RNA without a template. The long poly-A tail is unique to transcripts made by Pol II.

In the process of terminating transcription by Pol I and Pol II, the elongation complex does not dissolve immediately after the RNA is cleaved. The polymerase continues to move along the template, generating a second RNA molecule associated with the elongation complex. Two models have been proposed to explain how termination is achieved at last. The allosteric model states that when transcription proceeds through the termination sequence, it causes disassembly of elongation factors and/or an assembly of termination factors that cause conformational changes of the elongation complex. The torpedo model suggests that a 5' to 3' exonuclease degrades the second RNA as it emerges from the elongation complex. Polymerase is released as the highly processive exonuclease overtakes it. It is proposed that an emerging view will express a merge of these two models.

=== Factor-independent ===
RNA polymerase III can terminate transcription efficiently without the involvement of additional factors. The Pol III termination signal consists of a stretch of thymines (on the non template strand) located within 40 bp downstream from the 3' end of mature RNAs. The poly-T termination signal pauses Pol III

== Eukaryotic transcriptional control ==
The regulation of gene expression in eukaryotes is achieved through the interaction of several levels of control that acts both locally to turn on or off individual genes in response to a specific cellular need and globally to maintain a chromatin-wide gene expression pattern that shapes cell identity. Because eukaryotic genome is wrapped around histones to form nucleosomes and higher-order chromatin structures, the substrates for transcriptional machinery are in general partially concealed. Without regulatory proteins, many genes are expressed at low level or not expressed at all. Transcription requires displacement of the positioned nucleosomes to enable the transcriptional machinery to gain access of the DNA.

All steps in the transcription are subject to some degree of regulation. Transcription initiation in particular is the primary level at which gene expression is regulated. Targeting the rate-limiting initial step is the most efficient in terms of energy costs for the cell. Transcription initiation is regulated by cis-acting elements (enhancers, silencers, isolators) within the regulatory regions of the DNA, and sequence-specific trans-acting factors that act as activators or repressors. Gene transcription can also be regulated post-initiation by targeting the movement of the elongating polymerase.

=== Global control and epigenetic regulation ===
The eukaryotic genome is organized into a compact chromatin structure that allows only regulated access to DNA. The chromatin structure can be globally "open" and more transcriptionally permissive, or globally "condensed" and transcriptionally inactive. The former (euchromatin) is lightly packed and rich in genes under active transcription. The latter (heterochromatin) includes gene-poor regions such as telomeres and centromeres but also regions with normal gene density but transcriptionally silenced. Transcription can be silenced by histone modification (deacetylation and methylation), RNA interference, and/or DNA methylation.

The gene expression patterns that define cell identity are inherited through cell division. This process is called epigenetic regulation. DNA methylation is reliably inherited through the action of maintenance methylases that modify the nascent DNA strand generated by replication. In mammalian cells, DNA methylation is the primary marker of transcriptionally silenced regions. Specialized proteins can recognize the marker and recruit histone deacetylases and methylases to re-establish the silencing. Nucleosome histone modifications could also be inherited during cell division, however, it is not clear whether it can work independently without the direction by DNA methylation.

=== Gene-specific activation ===
The two main tasks of transcription initiation are to provide RNA polymerase with an access to the promoter and to assemble general transcription factors with polymerase into a transcription initiation complex. Diverse mechanisms of initiating transcription by overriding inhibitory signals at the gene promoter have been identified. Eukaryotic genes have acquired extensive regulatory sequences that encompass a large number of regulator-binding sites and spread overall kilobases (sometimes hundreds of kilobases) from the promoter–-both upstream and downstream. The regulator binding sites are often clustered together into units called enhancers. Enhancers can facilitate highly cooperative action of several transcription factors (which constitute enhanceosomes). Remote enhancers allow transcription regulation at a distance. Insulators situated between enhancers and promoters help define the genes that an enhancer can or cannot influence.

Eukaryotic transcriptional activators have separate DNA-binding and activating functions. Upon binding to its cis-element, an activator can recruit polymerase directly or recruit other factors needed by the transcriptional machinery. An activator can also recruit nucleosome modifiers that alter chromatin in the vicinity of the promoter and thereby help initiation. Multiple activators can work together, either by recruiting a common or two mutually dependent components of the transcriptional machinery, or by helping each other bind to their DNA sites. These interactions can synergize multiple signaling inputs and produce intricate transcriptional responses to address cellular needs.

=== Gene-specific repression ===
Eukaryotic transcription repressors share some of the mechanisms used by their prokaryotic counterparts. For example, by binding to a site on DNA that overlaps with the binding site of an activator, a repressor can inhibit binding of the activator. But more frequently, eukaryotic repressors inhibit the function of an activator by masking its activating domain, preventing its nuclear localization, promoting its degradation, or inactivating it through chemical modifications. Repressors can directly inhibit transcription initiation by binding to a site upstream of a promoter and interacting with the transcriptional machinery. Repressors can indirectly repress transcription by recruiting histone modifiers (deacetylases and methylases) or nucleosome remodeling enzymes that affect the accessibility of the DNA. Repressing histone and DNA modifications are also the basis of transcriptional silencing that can spread along the chromatin and switch off multiple genes.

=== Elongation and termination control ===
The elongation phase starts once assembly of the elongation complex has been completed, and progresses until a termination sequence is encountered. The post-initiation movement of RNA polymerase is the target of another class of important regulatory mechanisms. For example, the transcriptional activator Tat affects elongation rather than initiation during its regulation of HIV transcription. In fact, many eukaryotic genes are regulated by releasing a block to transcription elongation called promoter-proximal pausing. Pausing can influence chromatin structure at promoters to facilitate gene activity and lead to rapid or synchronous transcriptional responses when cells are exposed to an activation signal. Pausing is associated with the binding of two negative elongation factors, DSIF (SPT4/SPT5) and NELF, to the elongation complex. Other factors can also influence the stability and duration of the paused polymerase. Pause release is triggered by the recruitment of the P-TEFb kinase.

Transcription termination has also emerged as an important area of transcriptional regulation. Termination is coupled with the efficient recycling of polymerase. The factors associated with transcription termination can also mediate gene looping and thereby determine the efficiency of re-initiation.

== Transcription-coupled DNA repair ==
When transcription is arrested by the presence of a lesion in the transcribed strand of a gene, DNA repair proteins are recruited to the stalled RNA polymerase to initiate a process called transcription-coupled repair. Central to this process is the general transcription factor TFIIH that has ATPase activity. TFIIH causes a conformational change in the polymerase, to expose the transcription bubble trapped inside, in order for the DNA repair enzymes to gain access to the lesion. Thus, RNA polymerase serves as damage-sensing protein in the cell to target repair enzymes to genes that are being actively transcribed.

== Comparisons between prokaryotic and eukaryotic transcription ==
Eukaryotic transcription is more complex than prokaryotic transcription. For instance, in eukaryotes the genetic material (DNA), and therefore transcription, is primarily localized to the nucleus, where it is separated from the cytoplasm (in which translation occurs) by the nuclear membrane. This allows for the temporal regulation of gene expression through the sequestration of the RNA in the nucleus, and allows for selective transport of mature RNAs to the cytoplasm. Bacteria do not have a distinct nucleus that separates DNA from ribosome and mRNA is translated into protein as soon as it is transcribed. The coupling between the two processes provides an important mechanism for prokaryotic gene regulation.

At the level of initiation, RNA polymerase in prokaryotes (bacteria in particular) binds strongly to the promoter region and initiates a high basal rate of transcription. No ATP hydrolysis is needed for the close-to-open transition, promoter melting is driven by binding reactions that favor the melted conformation. Chromatin greatly impedes transcription in eukaryotes. Assembly of large multi-protein preinitiation complex is required for promoter-specific initiation. Promoter melting in eukaryotes requires hydrolysis of ATP. As a result, eukaryotic RNA polymerases exhibit a low basal rate of transcription initiation.

== Regulation of transcription in cancer ==
In vertebrates, the majority of gene promoters contain a CpG island with numerous CpG sites. When many of a gene's promoter CpG sites are methylated the gene becomes silenced. Colorectal cancers typically have 3 to 6 driver mutations and 33 to 66 hitchhiker or passenger mutations. However, transcriptional silencing may be of more importance than mutation in causing progression to cancer. For example, in colorectal cancers about 600 to 800 genes are transcriptionally silenced by CpG island methylation (see regulation of transcription in cancer). Transcriptional repression in cancer can also occur by other epigenetic mechanisms, such as altered expression of microRNAs. In breast cancer, transcriptional repression of BRCA1 may occur more frequently by over-expressed microRNA-182 than by hypermethylation of the BRCA1 promoter (see Low expression of BRCA1 in breast and ovarian cancers).

== See also ==
- Bacterial transcription
- Regulation of gene expression
- RNA polymerase
- Transcriptional regulation
- Transcription factor
- Transcriptional memory
