= Archaeal transcription =

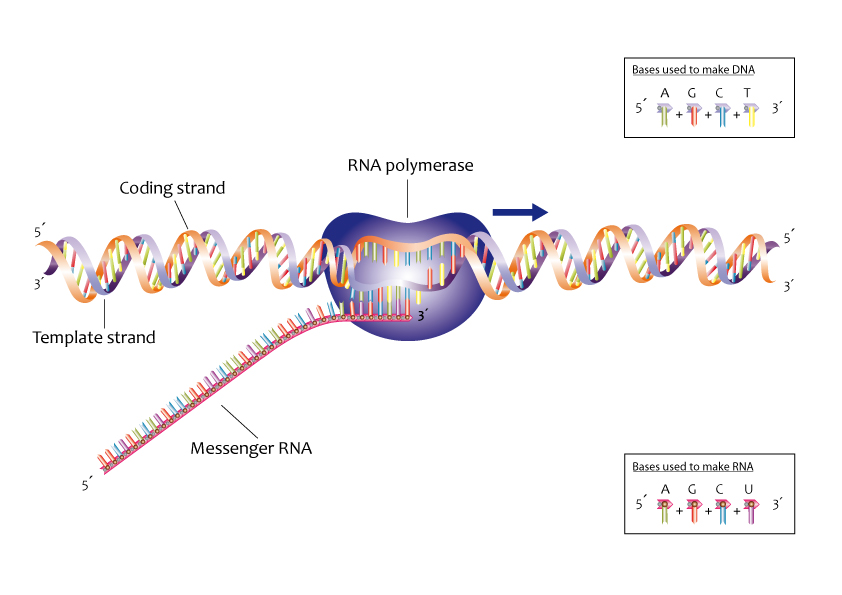
Transcription is the process of copying DNA into RNA, usually mRNA.

Archaeal transcription is the process in which a segment of archaeal DNA is copied into a newly synthesized strand of RNA using the sole Pol II-like RNA polymerase (RNAP). The process occurs in three main steps: initiation, elongation, and termination; and the end result is a strand of RNA that is complementary to a single strand of DNA. A number of transcription factors govern this process with homologs in both bacteria and eukaryotes, with the core machinery more similar to eukaryotic transcription.

Because archaea lack a membrane-enclosed nucleus like bacteria do, transcription and translation can happen at the same time on a newly-generated piece of mRNA. Operons are widespread in archaea.

== Initiation ==
Initiation in archaea is governed by TATA-binding protein (TBP), Archaeal transcription factor B (TFB), and Archaeal transcription factor E (TFE) that are homologous to eukaryotic TBP, TFIIB, and TFIIE respectively. These factors recognize the promoter core sequence (TATA box, B recognition element) upstream of the coding region and recruits the RNAP to form a closed transcription preinitiation complex (PIC).

The PIC is turned into an open state with the local DNA helix "melting" to load the template strand of DNA. The RNAP undergoes "abortive initiation": it makes and releases many short (2-15nt) segments before generating a transcript of significant length. This continues until it moves past the promoter (promoter escape), loosening TBP's grasp on the DNA, and swapping TFE out for elongation factors Spt4/5. How this escape happens exactly remains to be studied.

== Elongation ==
After getting out of the promoter region, the RNAP moves into the elongation state, where it keeps growing the new RNA strand in a processive process. Double stranded DNA that enters from the front of the enzyme is unzipped to avail the template strand for RNA synthesis. For every DNA base pair separated by the advancing polymerase, one hybrid RNA:DNA base pair is immediately formed. DNA strands and nascent RNA chain exit from separate channels; the two DNA strands reunite at the trailing end of the transcription bubble while the single strand RNA emerges alone.

A number of elongation factors help with the rate and processivity of the RNAP. Factors of the Spt4/Spt5 family (bacterial homolog of Spt5 is called NusG) stimulate transcription by binding to the RNAP clamp on one side of the DNA channel and to the gate loop on the other. The resultant DSIF locks the clamp into a closed state to prevent the elongation complex (EC) from dissociating. Spt5 also has a NGN domain that helps the two strands separate. A KOW domain probably hooks the RNAP up to a ribosome so that translation and transcription happen together.

Some archaea have an Elf1 homolog that might also act as an elongation factor.

=== Backtracking ===
The RNAP occasionally stops and starts moving backwards when it encounters a roadblock or some difficult sequences. When this happens, the EC gets stuck because the reactive 3' edge of the RNA is out of the active site. The transcript cleavage factor TFS (a TFIIS homolog) helps resolve this issue by generating a cut so that a new 3' end is available in the active site. Some archaeon have up to 4 paralogs of TFS with divergent functions.

== Termination ==
Not much is known about archaeal termination. Euryarchaeal RNAPs seem to terminate on their own when poly-U stretches appear.
