= TFB =

TFB may refer to:

- "Too Fucking Bad", an instant messaging abbreviation
- Trust fund baby, a person who lives off of family wealth
- Toys for Bob, an American video game developer
- Thin-film battery, a type of rechargeable battery
- Archaeal transcription factor B, a protein involved in archaeal transcription
- The Front Bottoms, an indie rock band
- The Future Bites, an album by Steven Wilson
