= GTF2A1L =

Protein-coding gene in the species Homo sapiens

Identifiers
- Aliases: GTF2A1L, ALF, general transcription factor IIA subunit 1 like
- External IDs: OMIM: 605358; MGI: 1919078; GeneCards: GTF2A1L

Gene location (Mouse)
Chr.	Chromosome 17 (mouse)
Band	17|17 E4	Start	88,976,088 bp
Band	17|17 E4	End	89,022,580 bp
RNA expression pattern
Bgee	Human / Mouse (ortholog); Top expressed in: stromal cell of endometrium; left uterine tube; Achilles tendon; canal of the cervix; right lung; popliteal artery; myometrium; ascending aorta; left coronary artery; gastric mucosa / Top expressed in: seminiferous tubule; spermatid; spermatocyte; primary oocyte; secondary oocyte; zygote; embryo; embryo; blastocyst; medial ganglionic eminence; More reference expression data
BioGPS	n/a
Gene ontology
Molecular function	DNA binding; transcription coactivator activity; protein binding
Cellular component	transcription factor TFIIA complex; nucleus; cytoplasm
Biological process	transcription initiation from RNA polymerase II promoter; regulation of transcription, DNA-templated; transcription by RNA polymerase II; cognition; transcription, DNA-templated; positive regulation of nucleic acid-templated transcription
Sources:Amigo / QuickGO
Orthologs
Databases	NCBI: entry
Species	Human	Mouse
Entrez	11036	71828
Ensembl	n/a	ENSMUSG00000024154
UniProt	Q9UNN4	Q8R4I4
RefSeq (mRNA)	NM_172196; NM_001193487; NM_006872	NM_023630
RefSeq (protein)	NP_001180416; NP_006863	NP_076119
Location (UCSC)	n/a	Chr 17: 88.98 – 89.02 Mb
PubMed search
- Wikidata
View/Edit Human	View/Edit Mouse

TFIIA-alpha and beta-like factor is a protein that in humans is encoded by the GTF2A1L gene.

The assembly and stability of the RNA polymerase II transcription pre-initiation complex on a eukaryotic core promoter involve the effects of TFIIA on the interaction between TATA-binding protein (TBP) and DNA.

This gene encodes a germ cell-specific counterpart of the large (alpha/beta) subunit of general transcription factor TFIIA that is able to stabilize the binding of TBP to DNA and may be uniquely important to testis biology. Alternative splicing for this locus has been observed and two variants, encoding distinct isoforms, have been identified.

Co-transcription of this gene and the neighboring upstream gene generates a rare transcript (SALF), which encodes a fusion protein consisting of sequence sharing identity with each individual gene product.
