= Preinitiation complex =

Preinitiation complex can refer to:

- Transcription preinitiation complex
- Translation preinitiation complex
