= Prokaryotic translation =

Prokaryotic translation may refer to:

- Bacterial translation, the process by which messenger RNA is translated into proteins in bacteria
- Archaeal translation, the process by which messenger RNA is translated into proteins in archaea

== See also ==
- Prokaryote
- Translation (biology)
