= Prokaryotic transcription =

Prokaryotic transcription could mean:

- Bacterial transcription
- Archaeal transcription
