= Class II gene =

Type of gene

A class II gene may refer to several types of genes:

== MHC class II genes ==
A class II gene is a component of the major histocompatibility complex (also called human leukocyte antigen) which contribute to the body's overall immune response.

These genes code alpha and beta-chains of proteins which makes up the MHC class II molecules.

== RNA Polymerase II-transcripted genes ==
Class II genes may also refer to any protein-coding genes which are transcribed by RNA Polymerase II. These genes generally have a promoter which may contain a TATA box structure. Formation of these types of genes requires a preinitiation complex.

== Olfactory receptor genes ==
The genes which code for olfaction are typically split into "Class I" and "Class II" genes. Class I genes are those which are found in more basal taxa of animals (e.g., teleosts), whereas Class II are those found exclusively in mammals, birds, and amphibians.

== Plant LBD genes ==
In some plants, the genes in the "Lateral Organ Boundary Development" (LBD) family are broken into classes. These genes are responsible for the formation and development of several critical structures and processes within plants, including pollen development and immune responses.

Differentiation of these gene classes has to do with their evolutionary timeline, with class II genes having arisen more recently than those in class I. These classes of genes may also be differentiated by structural differences that vary between plant taxa.
