= Transcription factor II F =

General transcription initiation factor

general transcription factor IIF, polypeptide 1, 74kDa

Identifiers
- Symbol: GTF2F1
- Alt. symbols: TFIIF, BTF4, RAP74
- NCBI gene: 2962
- HGNC: 4652
- OMIM: 189968
- RefSeq: NM_002096
- UniProt: P35269

Other data
- Locus: Chr. 19 p13.3
Search for
- Structures: Swiss-model
- Domains: InterPro

general transcription factor IIF, polypeptide 2, 30kDa

Identifiers
- Symbol: GTF2F2
- Alt. symbols: TFIIF, BTF4, RAP30
- NCBI gene: 2963
- HGNC: 4653
- OMIM: 189969
- RefSeq: NM_004128
- UniProt: P13984

Other data
- Locus: Chr. 13 q14
Search for
- Structures: Swiss-model
- Domains: InterPro

general transcription factor IIF, polypeptide 2-like

Identifiers
- Symbol: GTF2F2L
- Alt. symbols: TFIIF
- NCBI gene: 2964
- HGNC: 4654
- RefSeq: NG_003013

Other data
- Locus: Chr. 4 q31.22

Transcription factor II F (TF_{II}F) is one of several general transcription factors that make up the RNA polymerase II preinitiation complex.

TF_{II}F is encoded by the GTF2F1, GTF2F2, and GTF2F2L genes.

TF_{II}F binds to RNA polymerase II when the enzyme is already unbound to any other transcription factor, thus preventing it from contacting DNA outside the promoter. Furthermore, TF_{II}F stabilizes the RNA polymerase II while it's contacting TBP and TF_{II}B.

== See also ==
- TF_{II}A
- TF_{II}B
- TF_{II}D
- TF_{II}E
- TF_{II}H
