= MAGEA11 =

Protein-coding gene in humans

Identifiers
- Aliases: MAGEA11, CT1.11, MAGE-11, MAGE11, MAGEA-11, MAGE family member A11
- External IDs: OMIM: 300344; MGI: 1333839; GeneCards: MAGEA11

Gene location (Human)
Chr.	X chromosome (human)
Band	Xq28	Start	149,688,228 bp
Band	Xq28	End	149,717,268 bp

Gene location (Mouse)
Chr.	X chromosome (mouse)
Band	X A7.3|X 37.2 cM	Start	71,265,623 bp
Band	X A7.3|X 37.2 cM	End	71,266,570 bp
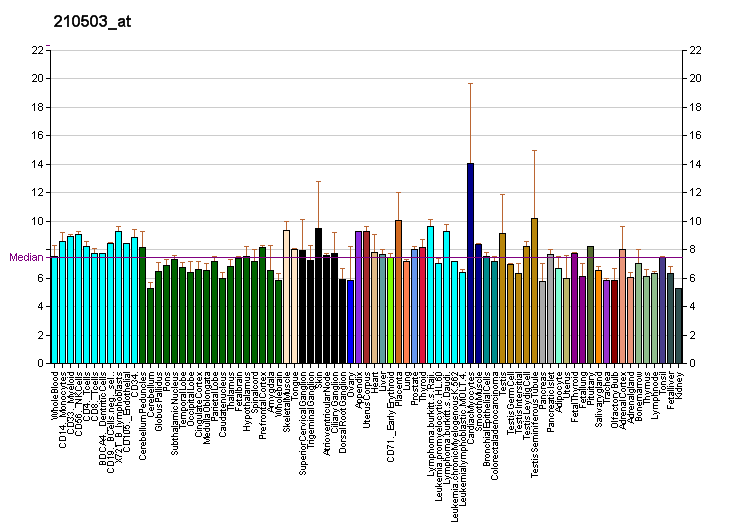
RNA expression pattern
Bgee	Human / Mouse (ortholog); Top expressed in: corpus epididymis; testicle; tail of epididymis; gonad; right testis; placenta; left testis; muscle of thigh; endometrium; zone of skin / Top expressed in: embryo; major salivary gland; testicle; spermatid; submandibular gland; gastrula; More reference expression data
BioGPS	More reference expression data
Orthologs
Databases	NCBI: entry; OMA: entry
Species	Human	Mouse
Entrez	4110	17140
Ensembl	ENSG00000185247	ENSMUSG00000033343
UniProt	P43364	F2Z493
RefSeq (mRNA)	NM_001011544; NM_005366	NM_020280
RefSeq (protein)	NP_001011544; NP_005357	NP_064676
Location (UCSC)	Chr X: 149.69 – 149.72 Mb	Chr X: 71.27 – 71.27 Mb
PubMed search
- Wikidata
View/Edit Human	View/Edit Mouse

Melanoma-associated antigen 11 is a protein that in humans is encoded by the MAGEA11 gene. It is also involved in the androgen and progesterone receptor signaling pathways.

MAGEA11 is an androgen coregulator specific to primates. It was first identified in human melanomas, and has since been linked to several cancers. It is observed on spermatogonia and primary spermatocytes, and in some prostate and breast cancers.

This gene is a member of the MAGEA gene family. The members of this family encode proteins with 50 to 80% sequence identity to each other. The promoters and first exons of the MAGEA genes show considerable variability, suggesting that the existence of this gene family enables the same function to be expressed under different transcriptional controls. The MAGEA genes are clustered at chromosomal location Xq28. They have been implicated in some hereditary disorders, such as [dyskeratosis congenita]. Two transcript variants encoding different isoforms have been found for this gene.

== Interactions ==
MAGEA11 has been shown to interact with TCEA2, androgen receptor and SH2D4A.

== Genetics ==
MAGE-A genes have several noncoding exons followed by one protein-coding exon. MAGEA11 is mapped to the human chromosome X, forming a locus at q28 with other MAGE-A proteins. MAGE-A11 is located between two copies of MAGEA9 and MAGEA8, and is immediately downstream of the duplicated area. Its sublocus is about 2 Mb from the second sublocus containing the other MAGEA genes.

== Androgen receptor ==
MAGE-A11 is part of the androgen receptor signaling pathway in humans. It binds directly to the androgen receptor, promoting transcriptional through direct binding to the androgen receptor FXXLF motif region. This control is specific to primates, and is due to a mutation in the androgen receptor from alanine to valine at residue 33, which extends the α-helix, which enables direct MAGE-A11 binding to the androgen receptor. Post-translational modification of the protein by phosphorylation of Thr-360 and monoubiquitinylation of Lys-240 and Lys-245 also stabilizes the interaction with the androgen receptor. MAGE-A11 likely links transcriptionally active androgen receptor dimers. The MAGE-A11 dependent increase in androgen receptor transcriptional activity is mediated by a direct interaction of MAGE-A11 and transcriptional intermediary factor 2 (TIF2), suggesting that MAGE-A11 may act as a bridging factor to recruit other androgen receptor coactivators. Mutations in the androgen receptor that interfere with binding of MAGE-A11 can cause partial androgen insensitivity syndrome.

== Progesterone receptor ==
MAGE-A11 also acts as an isoform-specific coregulator of full-length human progesterone receptor-B through an interaction with the receptor's N terminal. It increases progesterone and glucocorticoid receptor activity, resulting in greater regulatory control over activation domain dominance compared to mice.

== Cancer ==
Most MAGE-A genes are not expressed in healthy tissues except testicular, ovarian, and placental germ cells. They are expressed in tumor cells. MAGE-A11 in particular shows high expression in a small number of tumors, but low levels in all others.

=== Breast cancers ===
The MAGE-A family are linked to many kinds of cancerous tumors. MAGE-A11 expression is positively associated with HER-2 expression, and increased MAGE-A11 concentrations are associated with shorter life expectancies of patients with breast cancer.

=== Prostate cancer ===
Increased expression of MAGE-A11 during prostate cancer progression enhances both the androgen receptor signaling pathway and cancer growth. MAGE-A11 mRNA levels increase significantly during androgen deprivation therapy to treat prostate cancer, and MAGE-A11 levels have been found to be highest in castration-recurrent prostate cancer. The drastic increase is the result of DNA hypomethylation of a CpG island in the 5’ promoter of the MAGE-A11 gene. Cyclic AMP has also been found to increase MAGE-A11 expression as well as androgen receptor activity in prostate cancer cell lines, and extensive DNA methylation of the promoter inhibits the effects of cAMP.
