= GTF2E2 =

Protein-coding gene in the species Homo sapiens

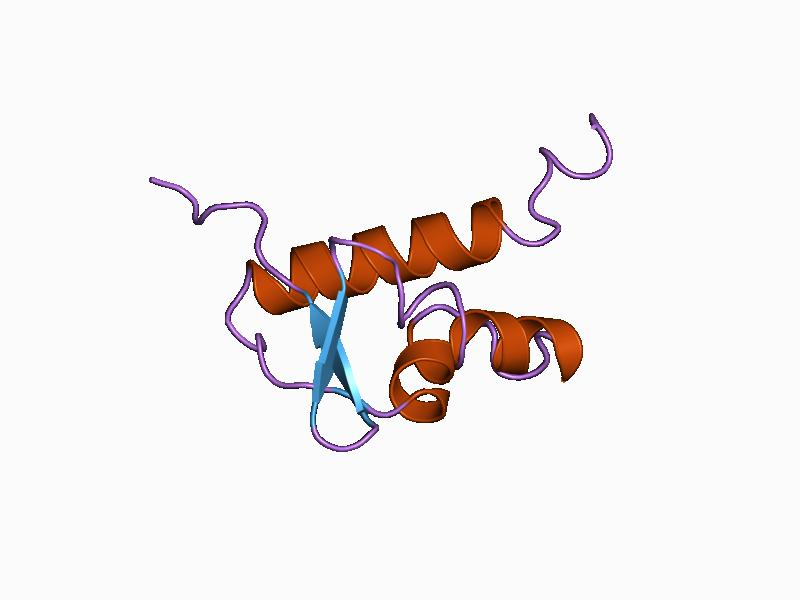

Identifiers
- Aliases: GTF2E2, FE, TF2E2, TFIIE-B, TTD6, general transcription factor IIE subunit 2
- External IDs: OMIM: 189964; MGI: 1915403; GeneCards: GTF2E2
Available structures
PDB	Ortholog search: PDBe RCSB
PDB	List of PDB id codes 1D8J, 1D8K, 5IY9, 5IYA, 5IYC, 5IYB, 5IY7, 5IY8, 5IYD, 5IY6

Gene location (Human)
Chr.	Chromosome 8 (human)
Band	8p12	Start	30,578,318 bp
Band	8p12	End	30,658,236 bp

Gene location (Mouse)
Chr.	Chromosome 8 (mouse)
Band	8|8 A4	Start	34,221,861 bp
Band	8|8 A4	End	34,267,201 bp
RNA expression pattern
Bgee	Human / Mouse (ortholog); Top expressed in: body of pancreas; right testis; left testis; Achilles tendon; sperm; gonad; islet of Langerhans; right adrenal gland; right adrenal cortex; stromal cell of endometrium / Top expressed in: otic placode; saccule; spermatid; spermatocyte; otic vesicle; tail of embryo; primitive streak; somite; genital tubercle; abdominal wall; More reference expression data
BioGPS	n/a
Gene ontology
Molecular function	DNA binding; protein binding; RNA binding; TFIIH-class transcription factor complex binding; RNA polymerase II general transcription initiation factor activity
Cellular component	nucleus; transcription factor TFIIE complex; nucleoplasm; transcription factor TFIID complex; cytosol; nuclear speck
Biological process	transcription elongation from RNA polymerase II promoter; transcription initiation from RNA polymerase II promoter; regulation of transcription, DNA-templated; transcription by RNA polymerase II; transcription, DNA-templated; snRNA transcription by RNA polymerase II
Sources:Amigo / QuickGO
Orthologs
Databases	NCBI: entry; OMA: entry
Species	Human	Mouse
Entrez	2961	68153
Ensembl	ENSG00000197265	ENSMUSG00000031585
UniProt	P29084	Q9D902
RefSeq (mRNA)	NM_002095; NM_001348353	NM_001167921; NM_001167922; NM_026584
RefSeq (protein)	NP_002086; NP_001335282	NP_001161393; NP_001161394; NP_080860
Location (UCSC)	Chr 8: 30.58 – 30.66 Mb	Chr 8: 34.22 – 34.27 Mb
PubMed search
- Wikidata
View/Edit Human	View/Edit Mouse

General transcription factor IIE subunit 2 (GTF2E2), also known as transcription initiation factor IIE subunit beta (TFIIE-beta), is a protein that in humans is encoded by the GTF2E2 gene.

== See also ==
- Transcription factor II E
