= Tata-box binding protein like 2 =

Protein-coding gene in the species Homo sapiens

TBPL2

Identifiers
- Aliases: TBPL2, TBP2, TRF3, TATA-box binding protein like 2
- External IDs: OMIM: 608964; MGI: 2684058; GeneCards: TBPL2

Gene location (Human)
Chr.	Chromosome 14 (human)
Band	14q22.3	Start	55,414,210 bp
Band	14q22.3	End	55,456,726 bp

Gene location (Mouse)
Chr.	Chromosome 2 (mouse)
Band	2|2 A3	Start	23,961,733 bp
Band	2|2 A3	End	23,986,607 bp
RNA expression pattern
Bgee	Human / Mouse (ortholog); Top expressed in: gonad; testicle; sural nerve; stromal cell of endometrium; skeletal muscle tissue; bone marrow cell; tonsil; urinary bladder; mucosa of transverse colon; ganglionic eminence / Top expressed in: morula; secondary oocyte; zygote; primary oocyte; blastocyst; ovary; right kidney; More reference expression data
BioGPS	n/a
Gene ontology
Molecular function	DNA-binding transcription factor activity; DNA binding; DNA-binding transcription factor activity, RNA polymerase II-specific; RNA polymerase II cis-regulatory region sequence-specific DNA binding; RNA polymerase II core promoter sequence-specific DNA binding; RNA polymerase III transcription regulatory region sequence-specific DNA binding; transcription factor binding
Cellular component	cytoplasm; nucleus; transcription factor TFIIIB complex; transcription regulator complex; transcription factor TFIID complex
Biological process	multicellular organism development; negative regulation of transcription, DNA-templated; regulation of transcription, DNA-templated; transcription, DNA-templated; DNA-templated transcription, initiation; regulation of transcription by RNA polymerase II; transcription by RNA polymerase II; RNA polymerase III preinitiation complex assembly
Sources:Amigo / QuickGO
Orthologs
Databases	NCBI: entry; OMA: entry
Species	Human	Mouse
Entrez	387332	227606
Ensembl	ENSG00000182521	ENSMUSG00000061809
UniProt	Q6SJ96	Q6SJ95
RefSeq (mRNA)	NM_199047	NM_001289689; NM_199059
RefSeq (protein)	NP_950248	NP_001276618; NP_951014
Location (UCSC)	Chr 14: 55.41 – 55.46 Mb	Chr 2: 23.96 – 23.99 Mb
PubMed search
- Wikidata
View/Edit Human	View/Edit Mouse

TATA-box binding protein like 2 is a protein that in humans is encoded by the TBPL2 gene. The TBPL2 protein is also known as TBP-related factor 3 (TRF3) and TATA binding protein 2 (TBP2). The protein was independently discovered in three laboratories as a vertebrate-specific family member of TATA-binding protein (TBP). Orthologs have been identified in mouse, frog (Xenopus tropicalis) and fish (Danio rerio). Whereas the TBP gene is found in all eukaryotes, TBPL2 is only found in vertebrates.

== Molecular properties ==
Similar to TBP, TBPL2 can bind to the TATA box. It interacts with other general transcription factors such as TFIIA and TFIIB and promotes transcription initiation in vitro. The core domain, which mediates this binding to DNA, shows 95% identity between TBP and TBPL2. The N-terminal domain of TBPL2 exhibits only limited homology to that of TBP.

== Expression and function ==
Early reports mistakenly suggested a wide expression pattern of TBPL2. The main site of expression, however, is the oocyte, where it acts as a replacement factor for TBP. Knockout mice are normal and viable, but females are not fertile in the absence of TBPL2 due to a defect in folliculogenesis. TBPL2 has also been identified as a factor necessary to reprogram stem cells to oocytes.
