= GTF2E1 =

Human protein-coding gene

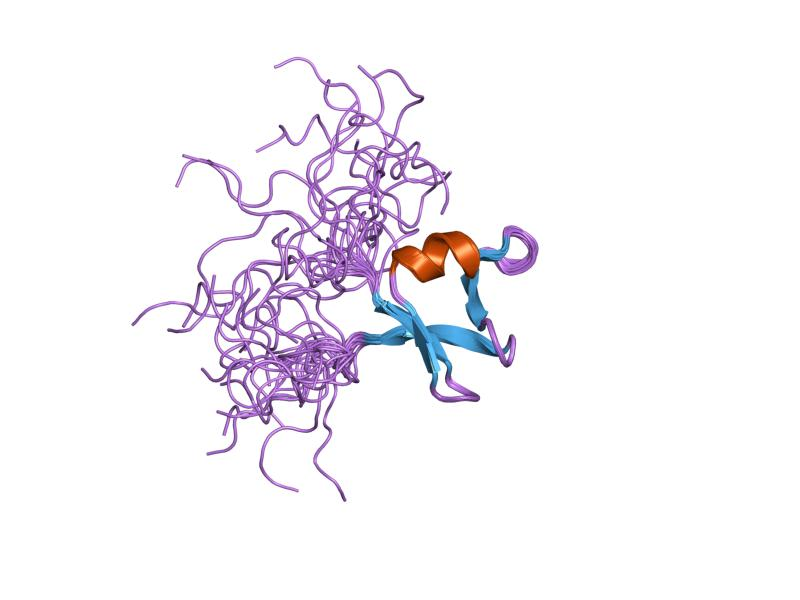

Identifiers
- Aliases: GTF2E1, FE, TF2E1, TFIIE-A, general transcription factor IIE subunit 1
- External IDs: OMIM: 189962; MGI: 1921447; GeneCards: GTF2E1
Available structures
| PDB | Ortholog search: PDBe RCSB |
| PDB | List of PDB id codes 1VD4, 2JTX, 2RNQ, 2RNR, 5IY9, 5IYC, 5IYD, 5IY7, 5IYA, 5IY6, 5IYB, 5IY8 |

Gene location (Human)
| Chr. | Chromosome 3 (human) |
| Band | 3q13.33 | Start | 120,742,637 bp |
| Band | 3q13.33 | End | 120,783,069 bp |

Gene location (Mouse)
| Chr. | Chromosome 16 (mouse) |
| Band | 16|16 B3 | Start | 37,330,152 bp |
| Band | 16|16 B3 | End | 37,360,151 bp |
RNA expression pattern
| Bgee | Human / Mouse (ortholog); Top expressed in: oocyte; secondary oocyte; testicle; gonad; periodontal fiber; sperm; monocyte; stromal cell of endometrium; right adrenal cortex; islet of Langerhans / Top expressed in: hand; superior cervical ganglion; otic vesicle; endocardial cushion; primitive streak; medial ganglionic eminence; abdominal wall; atrioventricular valve; iris; trigeminal ganglion; More reference expression data |
| BioGPS | n/a |
Gene ontology
| Molecular function | metal ion binding; sequence-specific DNA binding; protein binding; RNA polymerase II complex binding; TFIIH-class transcription factor complex binding; RNA polymerase II general transcription initiation factor activity |
| Cellular component | nucleus; nucleoplasm; transcription factor TFIID complex; cytosol; transcription preinitiation complex; transcription factor TFIIE complex |
| Biological process | regulation of transcription, DNA-templated; transcription by RNA polymerase II; transcription, DNA-templated; transcription initiation from RNA polymerase II promoter; snRNA transcription by RNA polymerase II; viral process; transcription open complex formation at RNA polymerase II promoter |
Sources:Amigo / QuickGO
Orthologs
| Databases | NCBI: entry; OMA: entry |
| Species | Human | Mouse |
| Entrez | 2960 | 74197 |
| Ensembl | ENSG00000153767 | ENSMUSG00000022828 |
| UniProt | P29083 | Q9D0D5 |
| RefSeq (mRNA) | NM_005513 | NM_028812; NM_001355727 |
| RefSeq (protein) | NP_005504 | NP_083088; NP_001342656 |
| Location (UCSC) | Chr 3: 120.74 – 120.78 Mb | Chr 16: 37.33 – 37.36 Mb |
| PubMed search |
- Wikidata
| View/Edit Human | View/Edit Mouse |

General transcription factor IIE subunit 1 (GTF2E1), also known as transcription initiation factor IIE subunit alpha (TFIIE-alpha), is a protein that in humans is encoded by the GTF2E1 gene.

== See also ==
- Transcription factor II E
