= SH2D4A =

Protein-coding gene in the species Homo sapiens

Identifiers
- Aliases: SH2D4A, PPP1R38, SH2A, SH2 domain containing 4A
- External IDs: OMIM: 614968; MGI: 1919531; GeneCards: SH2D4A

Gene location (Human)
Chr.	Chromosome 8 (human)
Band	8p21.3	Start	19,313,693 bp
Band	8p21.3	End	19,396,218 bp

Gene location (Mouse)
Chr.	Chromosome 8 (mouse)
Band	8|8 B3.3	Start	68,729,219 bp
Band	8|8 B3.3	End	68,800,351 bp
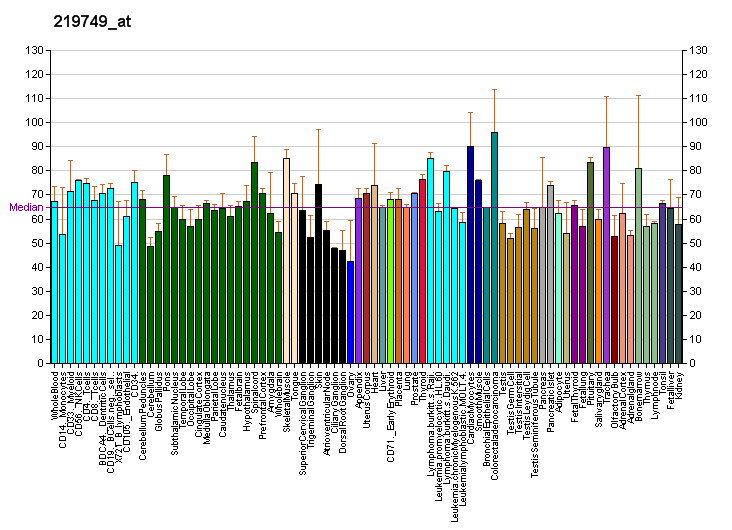
RNA expression pattern
Bgee	Human / Mouse (ortholog); Top expressed in: secondary oocyte; Achilles tendon; amniotic fluid; buccal mucosa cell; palpebral conjunctiva; left ovary; testicle; pylorus; parotid gland; right lobe of liver / Top expressed in: epithelium of stomach; parotid gland; left colon; urothelium; left lung lobe; transitional epithelium of urinary bladder; skin of external ear; esophagus; medullary collecting duct; right lung lobe; More reference expression data
BioGPS	More reference expression data
Gene ontology
Molecular function	protein binding; phosphatase binding
Cellular component	cytoplasm; cytosol
Biological process	negative regulation of phosphatase activity
Sources:Amigo / QuickGO
Orthologs
Databases	NCBI: entry; OMA: entry
Species	Human	Mouse
Entrez	63898	72281
Ensembl	ENSG00000104611	ENSMUSG00000053886
UniProt	Q9H788	Q9D7V1
RefSeq (mRNA)	NM_001174159; NM_001174160; NM_022071; NM_001363110; NM_001363111	NM_028182
RefSeq (protein)	NP_001167630; NP_001167631; NP_071354; NP_001350039; NP_001350040	NP_082458
Location (UCSC)	Chr 8: 19.31 – 19.4 Mb	Chr 8: 68.73 – 68.8 Mb
PubMed search
- Wikidata
View/Edit Human	View/Edit Mouse

SH2 domain-containing protein 4A is a protein that in humans is encoded by the SH2D4A gene.

== Interactions ==
SH2D4A has been shown to interact with MAGEA11.
