= Enhanceosome =

Biological protein

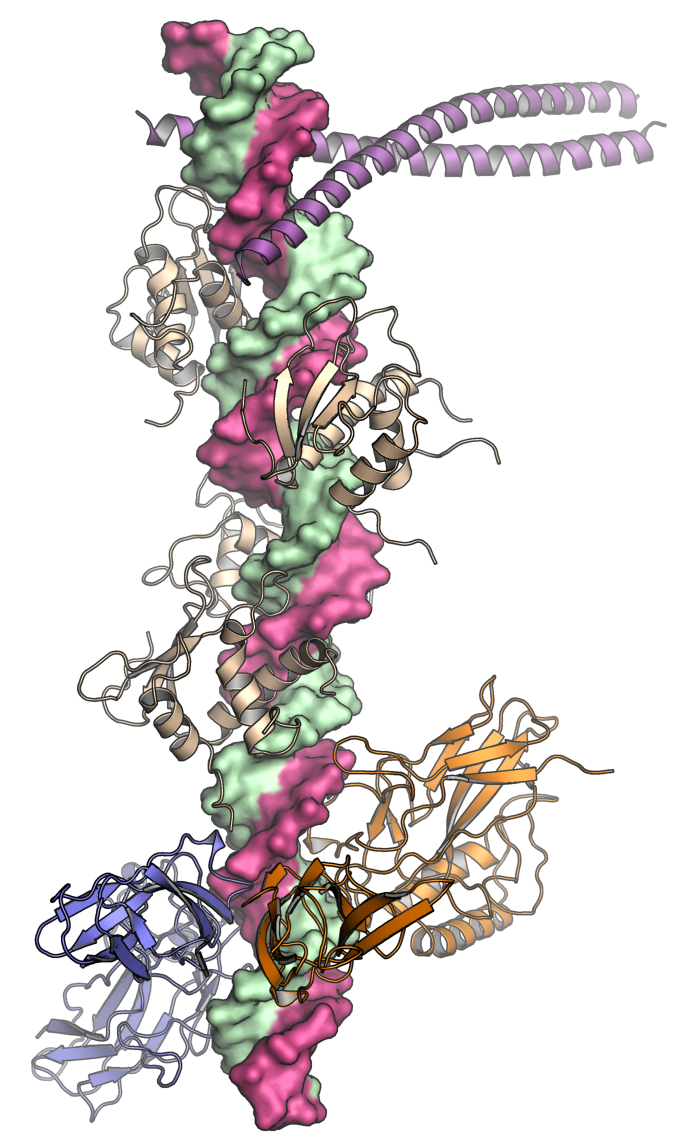
Structural model of the enhanceosome. Double-stranded DNA is shown in green and pink; the ATF-2/c-Jun coiled-coil DNA binding domain is shown in purple; interferon response factors are shown in beige; and NF kappa B is shown in orange (p105 subunit) and blue (p65 subunit).

An enhanceosome is a protein complex that assembles at an enhancer region on DNA and helps to regulate the expression of a target gene.

== Formation ==
Enhancers are bound by transcription activator proteins and transcriptional regulation is typically controlled by more than one activator. Enhanceosomes are formed in special cases when these activators cooperatively bind together along the enhancer sequence to create a distinct three-dimensional structure. Each enhanceosome is unique towards its specific enhancer. This assembly is facilitated by energetically favorable protein: protein and protein: DNA interactions. Therefore, all the necessary activators need to be present for the enhanceosome to be formed and able to function.

== Function ==
Once the enhanceosome has been formed, it recruits coactivators and general transcription factors to the promoter region of the target gene to begin transcription. The effectiveness of this is dependent on DNA conformation. As a result, the enhanceosome also recruits non histone architectural transcription factors, called high-mobility group (HMG) proteins, which are responsible for regulating chromatin structure. These factors do not bind to the enhancer, but instead are used to restructure the DNA to ensure that the genes can be accessed by the transcription factors.

== Role ==
Most enhanceosomes have been discovered pertaining to genes requiring tight regulation, like those associated with the cells defense system. Using more than one kind of transcriptional activator protein could help to ensure that a gene is not transcribed prematurely. Furthermore, the use of multiple factors enables gene regulation through a combination of cellular stimuli that function through multiple signaling cascades.

== Examples ==
=== IFN-β ===
The best known example of the enhanceosome acts on the human interferon-beta gene, which is upregulated in cells that are infected by viruses. Three activator proteins—NF-κB, an interferon activator protein such as IRF-3, and the ATF-2/c-Jun complex—cooperatively bind to the upstream enhancer region upon viral infection. The interaction is mediated by a fourth protein HMG-I, which assists in stabilizing the complex by promoting inter-protein interactions. The assembled enhanceosome recruits transcriptional machinery such as RNA polymerase to the promoter region to initiate gene expression.
