= THRAP3 =

Protein-coding gene in humans

Identifiers
- Aliases: THRAP3, TRAP150, thyroid hormone receptor associated protein 3, BCLAF2
- External IDs: OMIM: 603809; MGI: 2442637; GeneCards: THRAP3

Gene location (Human)
Chr.	Chromosome 1 (human)
Band	1p34.3	Start	36,224,416 bp
Band	1p34.3	End	36,305,357 bp

Gene location (Mouse)
Chr.	Chromosome 4 (mouse)
Band	4|4 D2.2	Start	126,164,082 bp
Band	4|4 D2.2	End	126,202,760 bp
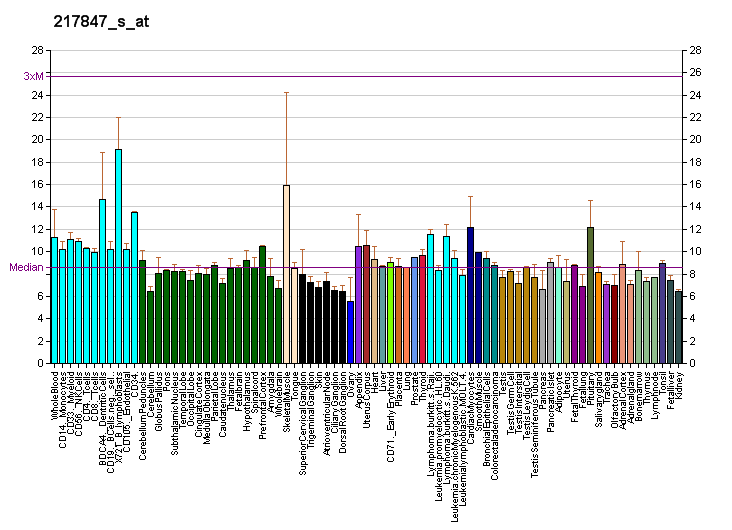
RNA expression pattern
Bgee	Human / Mouse (ortholog); Top expressed in: gastrocnemius muscle; ventricular zone; Achilles tendon; ganglionic eminence; stromal cell of endometrium; muscle of thigh; Descending thoracic aorta; gastric mucosa; right coronary artery; right lobe of thyroid gland / Top expressed in: tail of embryo; genital tubercle; ventricular zone; neural layer of retina; spermatocyte; yolk sac; epiblast; lip; Rostral migratory stream; muscle of thigh; More reference expression data
BioGPS	More reference expression data
Gene ontology
Molecular function	nucleotide binding; transcription coactivator activity; transcription coregulator activity; thyroid hormone receptor binding; phosphoprotein binding; core promoter sequence-specific DNA binding; protein binding; nuclear receptor coactivator activity; ATP binding; vitamin D receptor binding; RNA binding; RNA polymerase II cis-regulatory region sequence-specific DNA binding; signaling receptor activity
Cellular component	nuclear speck; mediator complex; exon-exon junction complex; nucleoplasm; extracellular exosome; nucleus
Biological process	androgen receptor signaling pathway; regulation of transcription, DNA-templated; positive regulation of mRNA splicing, via spliceosome; rhythmic process; mRNA processing; intracellular steroid hormone receptor signaling pathway; regulation of alternative mRNA splicing, via spliceosome; transcription, DNA-templated; positive regulation of transcription, DNA-templated; nuclear-transcribed mRNA catabolic process; mRNA stabilization; circadian rhythm; RNA splicing; positive regulation of circadian rhythm; transcription initiation from RNA polymerase II promoter; positive regulation of transcription by RNA polymerase II
Sources:Amigo / QuickGO
Orthologs
Databases	NCBI: entry; OMA: entry
Species	Human	Mouse
Entrez	9967	230753
Ensembl	ENSG00000054118	ENSMUSG00000043962
UniProt	Q9Y2W1	Q569Z6
RefSeq (mRNA)	NM_005119; NM_001321471; NM_001321473	NM_146153; NM_001356455; NM_001356456
RefSeq (protein)	NP_001308400; NP_001308402; NP_005110	NP_666265; NP_001343384; NP_001343385
Location (UCSC)	Chr 1: 36.22 – 36.31 Mb	Chr 4: 126.16 – 126.2 Mb
PubMed search
- Wikidata
View/Edit Human	View/Edit Mouse

Thyroid hormone receptor-associated protein 3 is a protein that in humans is encoded by the THRAP3 gene.
