= B recognition element =

The B recognition element (BRE) is a DNA sequence found in the promoter region of most genes in eukaryotes and Archaea. The BRE is a cis-regulatory element that is found immediately near TATA box, and consists of 7 nucleotides. There are two sets of BREs: one (BREu) found immediately upstream of the TATA box, with the consensus SSRCGCC; the other (BREd) found around 7 nucleotides downstream, with the consensus RTDKKKK. (Note: In nucleic acid notation for DNA, R (puRine) stands for A/G (adenine or guanine, which are both purines); S (Strong) stands for C/G (cytosine or guanine, which base-pair to form three hydrogen bonds); K (Keto) stands for G/T; D (not C) stands for A/T/G.)

The BREu was discovered in 1998 by Richard Ebright and co-workers. The BREd was named in 2005 by Deng and Roberts; such a downstream recognition was reported earlier in 2000 in Tsai and Sigler's crystal structure.

== Binding ==
The transcription factor II B (TFIIB) recognizes either BRE and binds to it. Both BREs work in conjunction with the TATA box (and TATA box binding protein), and have various effects on levels of transcription.

TFIIB uses the cyclin-like repeats to recognize DNA. The C-terminal alpha helices of TFIIB intercalate with the major groove of the DNA at the BREu. The N-terminal helices bind to the minor groove at BREd. TFIIB is one part of the preinitiation complex that helps RNA polymerase II bind to the DNA.

In addition to the human TFIIB-BRE structure, structures from many other organisms have been solved. Among those are transcription factor B (TFB) from the archaeon Pyrococcus woesei which presents an inverted orientation and a TFIIB from the parasite Trypanosoma brucei which despite some specific insertions show a similar fold.

== See also ==
- CAAT box
- Enhancer (genetics)
- Initiator element
- Insulator (genetics)
- Promoter (biology)
- Transcription start site
