= BTAF1 =

Protein-coding gene in the species Homo sapiens

Identifiers
- Aliases: BTAF1, MOT1, TAF(II)170, TAF172, TAFII170, B-TFIID TATA-box binding protein associated factor 1
- External IDs: OMIM: 605191; MGI: 2147538; GeneCards: BTAF1

Gene location (Human)
Chr.	Chromosome 10 (human)
Band	10q23.32	Start	91,923,770 bp
Band	10q23.32	End	92,030,325 bp

Gene location (Mouse)
Chr.	Chromosome 19 (mouse)
Band	19|19 C2	Start	36,903,479 bp
Band	19|19 C2	End	36,990,152 bp
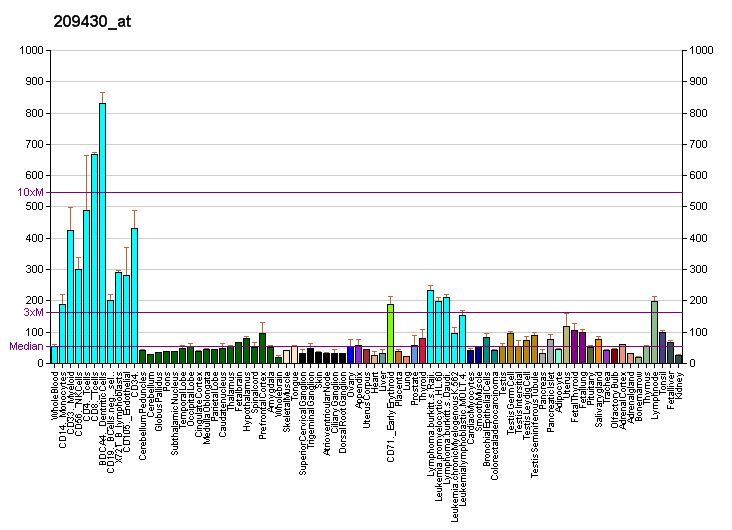
RNA expression pattern
Bgee	Human / Mouse (ortholog); Top expressed in: endothelial cell; germinal epithelium; hair follicle; Achilles tendon; cartilage tissue; epithelium of nasopharynx; pancreatic epithelial cell; gastric mucosa; tibia; skin of arm / Top expressed in: hand; seminiferous tubule; condyle; spermatocyte; fossa; medullary collecting duct; primitive streak; epidermis; abdominal wall; hair follicle; More reference expression data
BioGPS	More reference expression data
Gene ontology
Molecular function	DNA-binding transcription factor activity; DNA binding; nucleotide binding; hydrolase activity; ATP binding; helicase activity; protein binding
Cellular component	intracellular membrane-bounded organelle; nucleus; nucleoplasm
Biological process	negative regulation of transcription, DNA-templated; negative regulation of chromatin binding
Sources:Amigo / QuickGO
Orthologs
Databases	NCBI: entry; OMA: entry
Species	Human	Mouse
Entrez	9044	107182
Ensembl	ENSG00000095564	ENSMUSG00000040565
UniProt	O14981; Q2M1V9	E9QAE3
RefSeq (mRNA)	NM_003972	NM_001080706
RefSeq (protein)	NP_003963; NP_003963.1	NP_001074175
Location (UCSC)	Chr 10: 91.92 – 92.03 Mb	Chr 19: 36.9 – 36.99 Mb
PubMed search
- Wikidata
View/Edit Human	View/Edit Mouse

TATA-binding protein-associated factor 172 is a protein that in humans is encoded by the BTAF1 gene.

== Function ==
Initiation of transcription by RNA polymerase II requires the assistance of TATA box-binding protein (TBP; MIM 600075) and TBP-associated factors, or TAFs (e.g., TAF2B; MIM 604912), in 2 distinct complexes, TFIID and B-TFIID. The TFIID complex is composed of TBP and more than 8 TAFs. However, the majority of TBP is present in the B-TFIID complex, which is composed of TBP and TAFII170, also called TAF172, and has DNA-dependent ATPase activity.[supplied by OMIM]

== Interactions ==
BTAF1 has been shown to interact with TATA binding protein.
