= Archaeal translation =

Molecular biological process

Archaeal translation is the process by which messenger RNA is translated into proteins in archaea. Not much is known on this subject, but on the protein level it seems to resemble eukaryotic translation.

Most of the initiation, elongation, and termination factors in archaea have homologs in eukaryotes. Shine-Dalgarno sequences are only found in a minority of genes for many phyla, with many leaderless mRNAs probably initiated by scanning. The process of ABCE1 ATPase-based recycling is also shared with eukaryotes.

Being a prokaryote without a nucleus, archaea do perform transcription and translation at the same time as do bacteria.

== See also ==
- Bacterial, archaeal and plant plastid code
