= General transcription factor =

Class of protein transcription factors

Transcription factors. In the middle part above the promoter, the pink color part of the transcription factors are the General Transcription Factors.

General transcription factors (GTFs), also known as basal transcriptional factors, are a class of protein transcription factors that bind to specific sites (promoter) on DNA to activate transcription of genetic information from DNA to messenger RNA. GTFs, RNA polymerase, and the mediator (a multi-protein complex) constitute the basic transcriptional apparatus that first bind to the promoter, then start transcription. GTFs are also intimately involved in the process of gene regulation, and most are required for life.

A transcription factor is a protein that binds to specific DNA sequences (enhancer or promoter), either alone or with other proteins in a complex, to control the rate of transcription of genetic information from DNA to messenger RNA by promoting (serving as an activator) or blocking (serving as a repressor) the recruitment of RNA polymerase. As a class of protein, general transcription factors bind to promoters along the DNA sequence or form a large transcription preinitiation complex to activate transcription. General transcription factors are necessary for transcription to occur.

== Types ==
In bacteria, transcription initiation requires an RNA polymerase and a single GTF: sigma factor.

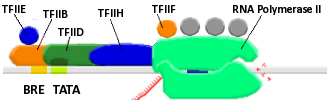
Transcription preinitiation complex

In archaea and eukaryotes, transcription initiation requires an RNA polymerase and a set of multiple GTFs to form a transcription preinitiation complex. Transcription initiation by eukaryotic RNA polymerase II involves the following GTFs:

- TFIIA – stabilizes the interaction between the TATA box and TFIID/TATA binding protein (TBP)
- TFIIB – recognizes the B recognition element (BRE) in promoters
- TFIID – binds to TBP and recognizes TBP associated factors (TAFs), also adds promoter selectivity
- TFIIE – attracts and regulates TFIIH
- TFIIF – stabilizes RNA polymerase interaction with TBP and TFIIB; helps attract TFIIE and TFIIH
- TFIIH – unwinds DNA at the transcription start point, phosphorylates Ser5 of the RNA polymerase CCTD, releases RNA polymerase from the promoter

== Function and mechanism ==
=== In bacteria ===
A sigma factor is a protein needed only for initiation of RNA synthesis in bacteria. Sigma factors provide promoter recognition specificity to the RNA polymerase (RNAP) and contribute to DNA strand separation, then dissociating from the RNA polymerase core enzyme following transcription initiation. The RNA polymerase core associates with the sigma factor to form RNA polymerase holoenzyme. Sigma factor reduces the affinity of RNA polymerase for nonspecific DNA while increasing specificity for promoters, allowing transcription to initiate at correct sites. The core enzyme of RNA polymerase has five subunits (protein subunits) (~400 kDa). Because of the RNA polymerase association with sigma factor, the complete RNA polymerase therefore has 6 subunits: the sigma subunit-in addition to the two alpha (α), one beta (β), one beta prime (β'), and one omega (ω) subunits that make up the core enzyme(~450 kDa). In addition, many bacteria can have multiple alternative σ factors. The level and activity of the alternative σ factors are highly regulated and can vary depending on environmental or developmental signals.

=== In archaea and eukaryotes ===
The transcription preinitiation complex is a large complex of proteins that is necessary for the transcription of protein-coding genes in eukaryotes and archaea. It attaches to the promoter of the DNA (e.i., TATA box) and helps position the RNA polymerase II to the gene transcription start sites, denatures the DNA, and then starts transcription.

==== Transcription preinitiation complex assembly ====
The assembly of transcription preinitiation complex follows these steps:

1. TATA binding protein (TBP), a subunit of TFIID (the largest GTF) binds to the promoter (TATA box), creating a sharp bend in the promoter DNA. Then the TBP-TFIIA interactions recruit TFIIA to the promoter.
2. TBP-TFIIB interactions recruit TFIIB to the promoter. RNA polymerase II and TFIIF assemble to form the Polymerase II complex. TFIIB helps the Pol II complex bind correctly.
3. TFIIE and TFIIH then bind to the complex and form the transcription preinitiation complex. TFIIA/B/E/H leave once RNA elongation begins. TFIID will stay until elongation is finished.
4. Subunits within TFIIH that have ATPase and helicase activity create negative superhelical tension in the DNA. This negative superhelical tension causes approximately one turn of DNA to unwind and form the transcription bubble.
5. The template strand of the transcription bubble engages with the RNA polymerase II active site, then RNA synthesis starts.
