= GTF2A1 =

Protein-coding gene in the species Homo sapiens

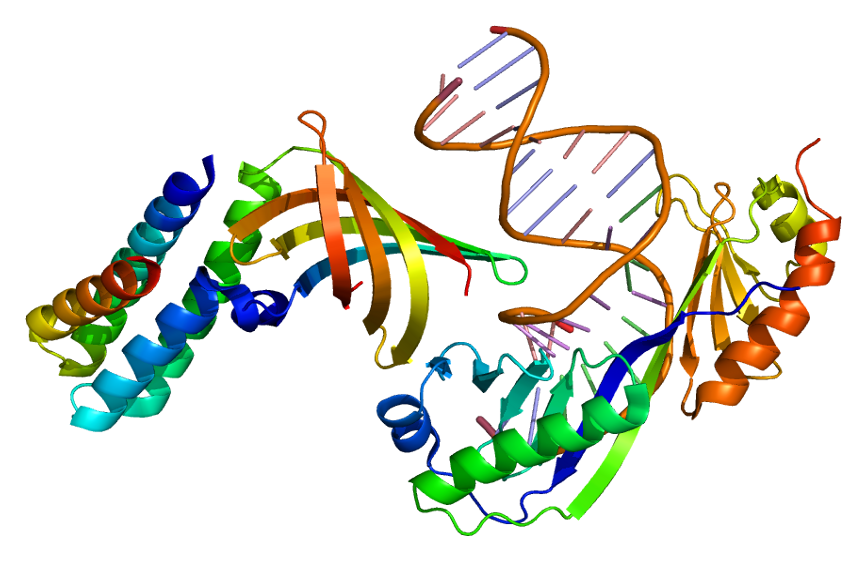

Identifiers
- Aliases: GTF2A1, TF2A1, TFIIA, TFIIA-42, TFIIAL, general transcription factor IIA subunit 1
- External IDs: OMIM: 600520; MGI: 1933277; GeneCards: GTF2A1
Available structures
PDB	Ortholog search: PDBe RCSB
PDB	List of PDB id codes 1NVP, 5IYB, 5IYC, 5IY9, 5IY8, 5IY7, 5IYD, 5IY6, 5FUR, 5IYA

Gene location (Human)
Chr.	Chromosome 14 (human)
Band	14q31.1	Start	81,175,452 bp
Band	14q31.1	End	81,221,377 bp

Gene location (Mouse)
Chr.	Chromosome 12 (mouse)
Band	12 D3|12	Start	91,522,036 bp
Band	12 D3|12	End	91,557,261 bp
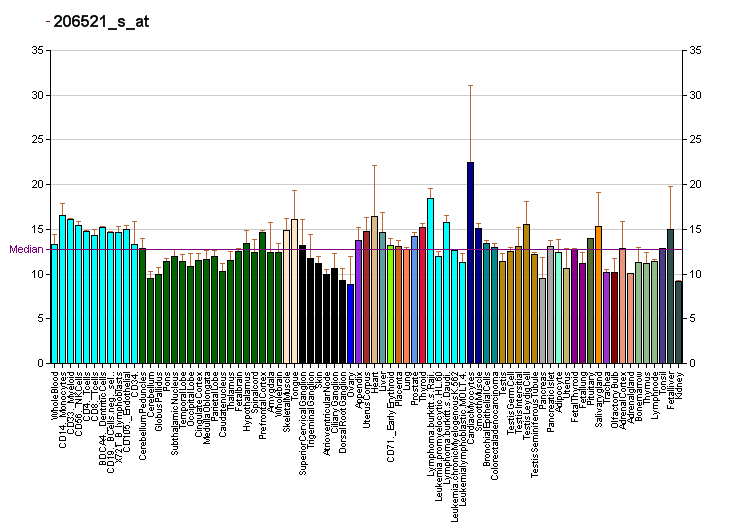
RNA expression pattern
Bgee	Human / Mouse (ortholog); Top expressed in: tibia; corpus epididymis; pons; trabecular bone; jejunal mucosa; oral cavity; postcentral gyrus; caput epididymis; Achilles tendon; tendon of biceps brachii / Top expressed in: zygote; secondary oocyte; retinal pigment epithelium; spermatocyte; genital tubercle; spermatid; ascending aorta; aortic valve; tail of embryo; primary oocyte; More reference expression data
BioGPS	More reference expression data
Gene ontology
Molecular function	TBP-class protein binding; DNA binding; transcription coactivator activity; transcription factor binding; protein binding; protein heterodimerization activity; RNA polymerase II general transcription initiation factor activity
Cellular component	transcription factor TFIIA complex; nucleus; nucleoplasm; transcription factor TFIID complex; cytosol; cytoplasm
Biological process	transcription initiation from RNA polymerase II promoter; regulation of transcription, DNA-templated; transcription by RNA polymerase II; transcription, DNA-templated; snRNA transcription by RNA polymerase II; positive regulation of nucleic acid-templated transcription
Sources:Amigo / QuickGO
Orthologs
Databases	NCBI: entry; OMA: entry
Species	Human	Mouse
Entrez	2957	83602
Ensembl	ENSG00000165417	ENSMUSG00000020962
UniProt	P52655	Q99PM3
RefSeq (mRNA)	NM_201595; NM_001278940; NM_015859	NM_031391; NM_175335
RefSeq (protein)	NP_001265869; NP_056943; NP_963889	NP_113568; NP_780544
Location (UCSC)	Chr 14: 81.18 – 81.22 Mb	Chr 12: 91.52 – 91.56 Mb
PubMed search
- Wikidata
View/Edit Human	View/Edit Mouse

Transcription initiation factor IIA subunit 1 is a protein that in humans is encoded by the GTF2A1 gene.

== Interactions ==
GTF2A1 has been shown to interact with TATA binding protein and TBPL1.

== See also ==
- Transcription Factor II A
