= EDF1 =

Protein-coding gene in the species Homo sapiens

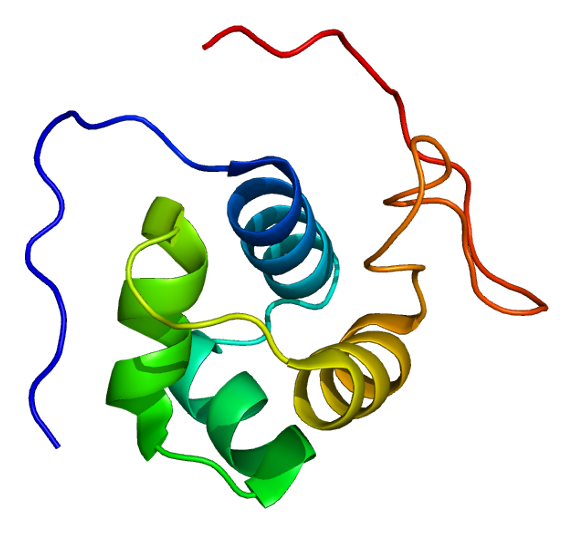

Identifiers
- Aliases: EDF1, EDF-1, MBF1, CFAP280, endothelial differentiation related factor 1
- External IDs: OMIM: 605107; MGI: 1891227; GeneCards: EDF1
Available structures
PDB	Ortholog search: PDBe RCSB
PDB	List of PDB id codes 1X57

Gene location (Human)
Chr.	Chromosome 9 (human)
Band	9q34.3	Start	136,862,119 bp
Band	9q34.3	End	136,866,308 bp

Gene location (Mouse)
Chr.	Chromosome 2 (mouse)
Band	2|2 A3	Start	25,447,859 bp
Band	2|2 A3	End	25,452,094 bp
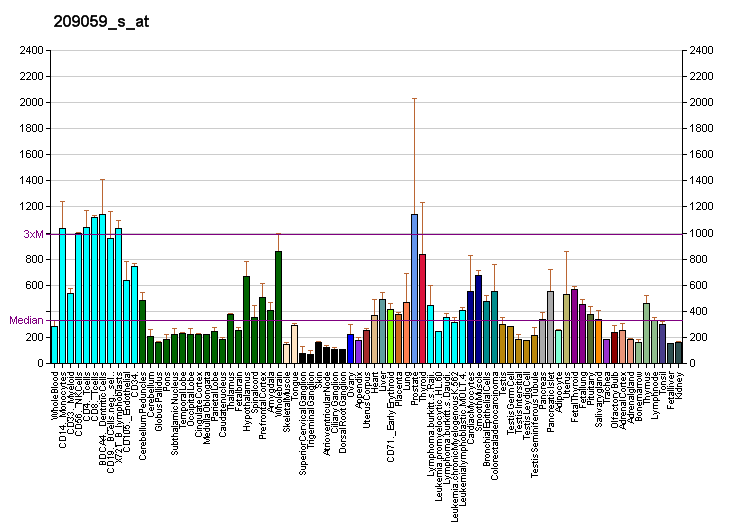

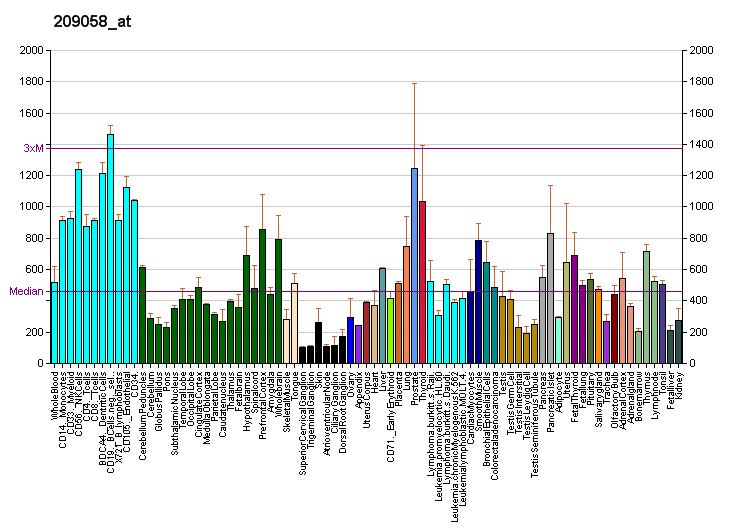
RNA expression pattern
Bgee	Human / Mouse (ortholog); Top expressed in: parotid gland; anterior pituitary; body of pancreas; right lobe of thyroid gland; left lobe of thyroid gland; mucosa of transverse colon; duodenum; right hemisphere of cerebellum; jejunal mucosa; body of stomach / Top expressed in: Paneth cell; facial motor nucleus; motor neuron; fossa; endothelial cell of lymphatic vessel; condyle; transitional epithelium of urinary bladder; duodenum; right kidney; left lobe of liver; More reference expression data
BioGPS	More reference expression data
Gene ontology
Molecular function	methyltransferase activity; sequence-specific DNA binding; DNA binding; DNA-binding transcription factor activity; transcription coactivator activity; calmodulin binding; histone acetyltransferase activity; protein binding; RNA binding; TFIID-class transcription factor complex binding
Cellular component	cytoplasm; transcription factor TFIID complex; intracellular anatomical structure; nucleolus; extracellular exosome; nucleus; cytosol
Biological process	cell differentiation; regulation of transcription, DNA-templated; transcription, DNA-templated; multicellular organism development; positive regulation of transcription, DNA-templated; regulation of lipid metabolic process; endothelial cell differentiation; positive regulation of DNA binding
Sources:Amigo / QuickGO
Orthologs
Databases	NCBI: entry; OMA: entry
Species	Human	Mouse
Entrez	8721	59022
Ensembl	ENSG00000107223	ENSMUSG00000015092
UniProt	O60869	Q9JMG1
RefSeq (mRNA)	NM_153200; NM_001281297; NM_001281298; NM_001281299; NM_003792	NM_021519
RefSeq (protein)	NP_001268226; NP_001268227; NP_001268228; NP_003783; NP_694880	NP_067494
Location (UCSC)	Chr 9: 136.86 – 136.87 Mb	Chr 2: 25.45 – 25.45 Mb
PubMed search
- Wikidata
View/Edit Human	View/Edit Mouse

Endothelial differentiation-related factor 1 is a protein that in humans is encoded by the EDF1 gene.

== Function ==
This gene encodes a protein that may regulate endothelial cell differentiation. It has been postulated that the protein functions as a bridging molecule that interconnects regulatory proteins and the basal transcriptional machinery, thereby modulating the transcription of genes involved in endothelial differentiation. This protein has also been found to act as a transcriptional coactivator by interconnecting the general transcription factor TATA element-binding protein (TBP) and gene-specific activators. Two alternatively spliced transcripts which encode distinct proteins have been found for this gene.

== Interactions ==
EDF1 has been shown to interact with:

- Liver X receptor alpha,
- Peroxisome proliferator-activated receptor gamma, and
- TATA binding protein.
