= TCEA2 =

Protein-coding gene in the species Homo sapiens

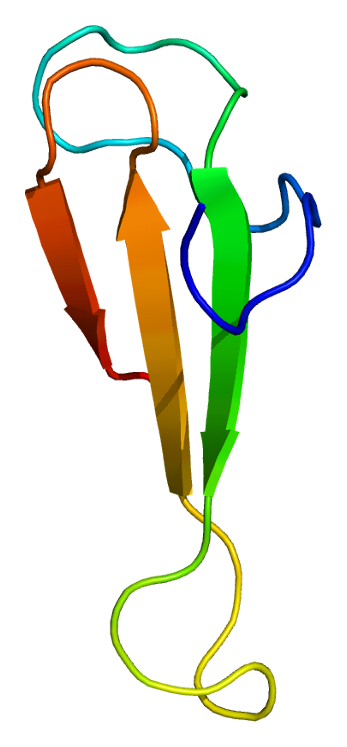
Available structures
PDB	Ortholog search: PDBe RCSB
PDB	List of PDB id codes 2LW4

Identifiers
- Aliases: TCEA2, TFIIS, transcription elongation factor A2
- External IDs: OMIM: 604784; MGI: 107368; HomoloGene: 68304; GeneCards: TCEA2; OMA:TCEA2 - orthologs

Gene location (Human)
Chr.	Chromosome 20 (human)
Band	20q13.33	Start	64,049,836 bp
Band	20q13.33	End	64,072,347 bp

Gene location (Mouse)
Chr.	Chromosome 2 (mouse)
Band	2 H4|2 103.72 cM	Start	181,322,103 bp
Band	2 H4|2 103.72 cM	End	181,329,864 bp
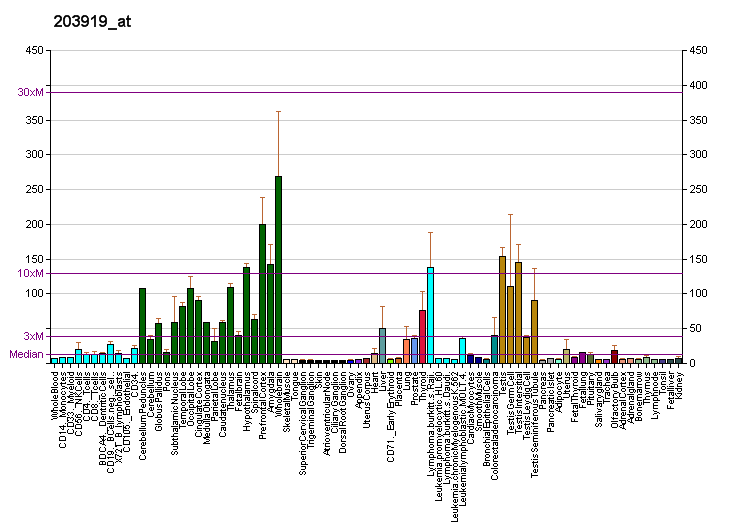
RNA expression pattern
Bgee	Human / Mouse (ortholog); Top expressed in: right hemisphere of cerebellum; right frontal lobe; left testis; right testis; nucleus accumbens; prefrontal cortex; cingulate gyrus; anterior cingulate cortex; anterior pituitary; ventricular zone / Top expressed in: spermatocyte; spermatid; seminiferous tubule; superior frontal gyrus; primary visual cortex; dentate gyrus of hippocampal formation granule cell; facial motor nucleus; cerebellar cortex; granulocyte; anterior horn of spinal cord; More reference expression data
BioGPS	More reference expression data
Gene ontology
Molecular function	DNA binding; zinc ion binding; protein binding; metal ion binding; nucleic acid binding; translation elongation factor activity
Cellular component	transcription elongation factor complex; nucleus
Biological process	DNA-templated transcription, elongation; regulation of transcription, DNA-templated; transcription, DNA-templated; positive regulation of transcription by RNA polymerase II; regulation of DNA-templated transcription, elongation; translational elongation
Sources:Amigo / QuickGO
Orthologs
Species	Human	Mouse
Entrez	6919	21400
Ensembl	ENSG00000171703	ENSMUSG00000059540
UniProt	Q15560; Q6IB64	Q9QVN7
RefSeq (mRNA)	NM_003195; NM_198723	NM_009326; NM_001356342; NM_001356343
RefSeq (protein)	NP_003186; NP_942016; NP_003186.1	NP_033352; NP_001343271; NP_001343272
Location (UCSC)	Chr 20: 64.05 – 64.07 Mb	Chr 2: 181.32 – 181.33 Mb
PubMed search
- Wikidata
View/Edit Human	View/Edit Mouse

Transcription elongation factor A protein 2 is a protein that in humans is encoded by the TCEA2 gene.

== Function ==
The protein encoded by this gene is found in the nucleus, where it functions as an SII class transcription elongation factor. Elongation factors in this class are responsible for releasing RNA polymerase II ternary complexes from transcriptional arrest at template-encoded arresting sites. The encoded protein has been shown to interact with general transcription factor IIB, a basal transcription factor. Two transcript variants encoding different isoforms have been found for this gene.

== Interactions ==
TCEA2 has been shown to interact with MAGEA11.
