= Archaeal transcription factor B =

Protein family

Transcription factor II B
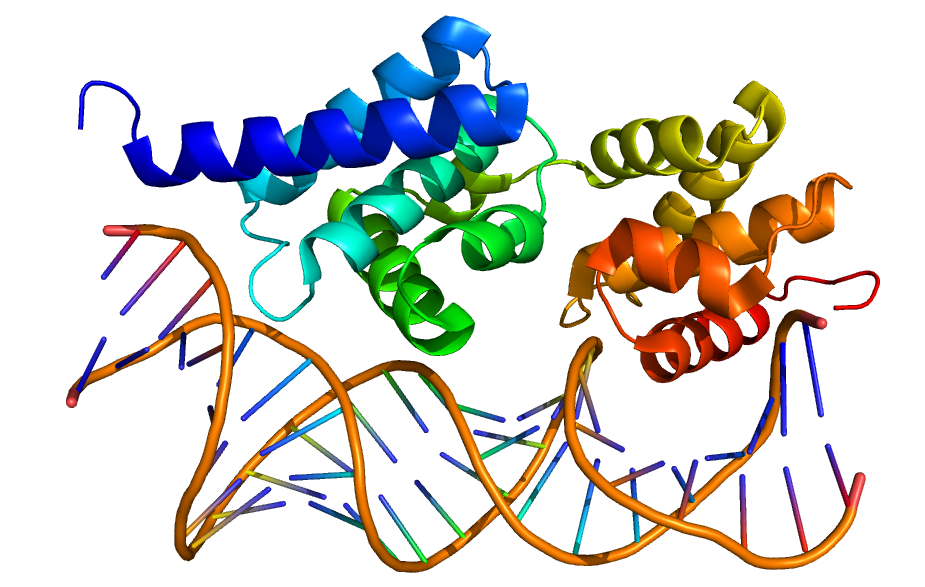
- Crystallographic structure of transcription factor II B (top; rainbow colored, N-terminus = blue, C-terminus = red) complexed with double stranded DNA (bottom).

Identifiers
- Organism: Pyrococcus woesei
- Symbol: tfb
- Orthologs: OMA: entry
- PDB: 1d3u
- UniProt: P61999
Search for
- Structures: Swiss-model
- Domains: InterPro

Archaeal transcription factor B (ATFB or TFB) is a protein family of extrinsic transcription factors that guide the initiation of RNA transcription in organisms that fall under the domain of Archaea. It is homologous to eukaryotic TFIIB and, more distantly, to bacterial sigma factor. Like these proteins, it is involved in forming transcription preinitiation complexes. Its structure includes several conserved motifs which interact with DNA and other transcription factors, notably the single type of RNA polymerase that performs transcription in Archaea.

== History ==
In bacteria and eukaryotes, proteins TFIIB and sigma factor are involved in the initiation of transcription, where they facilitate preinitiation complex formation and specific RNA Polymerase-DNA binding. The archaeal counterpart to these two proteins is TFB, which was first identified in the species Pyrococcus woesei in 1992. Since then, research has found that archaeal species must contain at least one copy of TFB to function, although some species may have multiple isoforms in their genome.

== Structure ==
TFB is a single polypeptide, around 280 to 300 amino acids in length and 34 kDa in mass, that is required for the recruitment of RNA polymerase (RNAP) to begin transcription, and it may also affect the transcription complex's structure during changes that occur before transcription, though specific mechanisms are unknown. TFB's structure consists of an amino-terminal region (TFB_{N}) with conserved sequences and complex structures, linked to a larger, globular carboxyl-terminal region (TFB_{C}). While the N-terminal domain mediates the RNAP interactions, the C-terminal domain mediates interactions with complex formed of the TATA box and TBP, a DNA sequence and polypeptide involved with translation initiation. The degree of conservation of TFB's sequence throughout Archaea ranges from 50% to 60%. In respect to its eukaryotic equivalent, TFB shows "high levels of structural and functional conservation." The interactions between TBP and a sequence upstream of the TATA box governs transcription polarity, "yields an archaeal preinitiation complex," and orients the complex in the direction in which the target gene should be transcribed. The TBP shows an inverted orientation compared to the eukaryotic TFIIB.

TFB_{N} makes up approximately one third of the protein and contains both a B-finger motif (homologous to the TFIIB B-finger) and a zinc-finger motif, the latter of which is located at amino acids 2-34. The N-terminal domain size varies from 100 to 120 amino acids in length. Crosslinking experiments have shown this domain is located close to the transcription start site. The zinc-finger interacts with the RNAP dock domain, and the B-finger may affect RNAP-promoter interactions. TFB_{C} contains motifs which interact with the TATA binding protein (TBP), the TFB-recognition elements (BRE) upstream of the TATA box, and sequences of DNA downstream of the TATA. Its size is approximately 180 amino acids, which is made up of two repeats of a 90-amino acid sequence. The C-terminal domain specifically may be what influences the direction of the preinitiation complex. Since TFB_{N} binds the RNAP and TFB_{C} binds the TBP-TATA complex, TBP connects the two.

== Mechanism ==
TFB is recruited by another translation factor, TBP, after it recognizes the TATA box and bends the DNA so transcription can initiate. TFB stabilizes the TBP-DNA complex so that the proteins can recruit RNA Polymerase and melt the DNA via a yet-unknown mechanism. This opening of the DNA is not an energy-dependent process in Archaea; since TFB, TBP, and RNAP are located more closely to each other than in Eukarya, the tightness of the proteins and their interactions may provide more areas of contact to open the DNA as well as physically strain the DNA, which leads to an open transcription complex.

TFB uses a zinc ion (Zn^{2+}) as a cofactor and accepts one ion per subunit.
