= Transcription factor II A =

Nuclear protein

general transcription factor IIA, 1, 19/37kDa

Identifiers
- Symbol: GTF2A1
- NCBI gene: 2957
- HGNC: 4646
- OMIM: 600520
- RefSeq: NM_201595
- UniProt: P52655

Other data
- Locus: Chr. 14 q31
Search for
- Structures: Swiss-model
- Domains: InterPro

general transcription factor IIA, 2, 12kDa

Identifiers
- Symbol: GTF2A2
- NCBI gene: 2958
- HGNC: 4647
- OMIM: 600519
- RefSeq: NM_004492
- UniProt: P52657

Other data
- Locus: Chr. 15 q21.3
Search for
- Structures: Swiss-model
- Domains: InterPro

Transcription factor TF_{II}A is a nuclear protein involved in the RNA polymerase II-dependent transcription of DNA. TF_{II}A is one of several general (basal) transcription factors (GTFs) that are required for all transcription events that use RNA polymerase II. Other GTFs include TF_{II}D, a complex composed of the TATA binding protein TBP and TBP-associated factors (TAFs), as well as the factors TF_{II}B, TF_{II}E, TF_{II}F, and TF_{II}H. Together, these factors are responsible for promoter recognition and the formation of a transcription preinitiation complex (PIC) capable of initiating RNA synthesis from a DNA template.

== Functions ==
TF_{II}A interacts with the TBP subunit of TF_{II}D and aids in the binding of TBP to TATA-box containing promoter DNA. Interaction of TF_{II}A with TBP facilitates formation of and stabilizes the preinitiation complex. Interaction of TF_{II}A with TBP also results in the exclusion of negative (repressive) factors that might otherwise bind to TBP and interfere with PIC formation. TF_{II}A also acts as a coactivator for some transcriptional activators, assisting with their ability to increase, or activate, transcription. The requirement for TF_{II}A in vitro transcription systems has been variable, and it can be considered either as a GTF and/or a loosely associated TAF-like coactivator. Genetic analysis in yeast has shown that TF_{II}A is essential for viability.

== Structure ==
TF_{II}A is a heterodimer with two subunits: one large unprocessed (subunit 1, or alpha/beta; gene name GTF2A1) and one small (subunit 2, or gamma; gene name GTF2A2). It was originally believed to be a heterotrimer of an alpha (p35), a beta (p19) and a gamma subunit (p12). In humans, the sizes of the encoded proteins are approximately 55 kD and 12 kD. Both genes are present in species ranging from humans to yeast, and their protein products interact to form a complex composed of a beta barrel domain and an alpha helical bundle domain. It is the N-terminal and C-terminal regions of the large subunit that participate in interactions with the small subunit. These regions are separated by another domain whose sequence is always present in large subunits from various species but whose size varies and whose sequence is poorly conserved. A second gene encoding a large TF_{II}A subunit has been found in some higher eukaryotes. This gene, ALF/TFIIAtau (gene name GTF2A1LF) is expressed only in oocytes and spermatocytes, suggesting it has a TF_{II}A-like regulatory role for gene expression only in germ cells.
