= TBPL1 =

Protein-coding gene in the species Homo sapiens

Identifiers
- Aliases: TBPL1, MGC:8389, MGC:9620, STUD, TLF, TLP, TRF2, TATA-box binding protein like 1
- External IDs: OMIM: 605521; MGI: 1339946; GeneCards: TBPL1

Gene location (Human)
Chr.	Chromosome 6 (human)
Band	6q23.2	Start	133,952,170 bp
Band	6q23.2	End	133,990,432 bp

Gene location (Mouse)
Chr.	Chromosome 10 (mouse)
Band	10|10 A3	Start	22,579,778 bp
Band	10|10 A3	End	22,607,837 bp
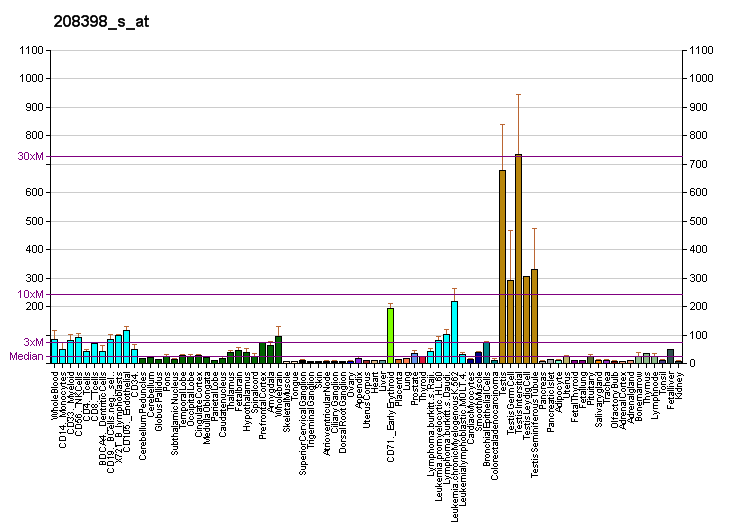
RNA expression pattern
Bgee	Human / Mouse (ortholog); Top expressed in: oocyte; secondary oocyte; left testis; right testis; sperm; ganglionic eminence; gonad; prefrontal cortex; Brodmann area 9; middle temporal gyrus / Top expressed in: spermatid; spermatocyte; seminiferous tubule; medial ganglionic eminence; tail of embryo; superior cervical ganglion; neural tube; ventricular zone; seminal vesicula; granulocyte; More reference expression data
BioGPS	More reference expression data
Gene ontology
Molecular function	DNA binding; transcription coactivator activity; protein binding; RNA polymerase II cis-regulatory region sequence-specific DNA binding; DNA-binding transcription activator activity, RNA polymerase II-specific; DNA-binding transcription factor activity, RNA polymerase II-specific; RNA polymerase II core promoter sequence-specific DNA binding; RNA polymerase III transcription regulatory region sequence-specific DNA binding; DNA-binding transcription factor activity; transcription factor binding
Cellular component	cytoplasm; transcription factor TFIIA complex; nucleus; transcription factor TFIIIB complex; transcription regulator complex; transcription factor TFIID complex
Biological process	spermatid nucleus differentiation; regulation of transcription, DNA-templated; transcription by RNA polymerase II; acrosome assembly; dTTP biosynthetic process; transcription, DNA-templated; spermatogenesis; DNA-templated transcription, initiation; positive regulation of transcription by RNA polymerase II; RNA polymerase III preinitiation complex assembly
Sources:Amigo / QuickGO
Orthologs
Databases	NCBI: entry; OMA: entry
Species	Human	Mouse
Entrez	9519	237336
Ensembl	ENSG00000028839	ENSMUSG00000071359
UniProt	P62380; Q7Z6T9	P62340
RefSeq (mRNA)	NM_004865; NM_001253676	NM_011603
RefSeq (protein)	NP_001240605; NP_004856	NP_035733
Location (UCSC)	Chr 6: 133.95 – 133.99 Mb	Chr 10: 22.58 – 22.61 Mb
PubMed search
- Wikidata
View/Edit Human	View/Edit Mouse

TATA box-binding protein-like protein 1 is a protein that in humans is encoded by the TBPL1 gene.

== Function ==
Initiation of transcription by RNA polymerase II requires the activities of more than 70 polypeptides. The protein that coordinates these activities is transcription factor IID (TFIID), which binds to the core promoter to position the polymerase properly, serves as the scaffold for assembly of the remainder of the transcription complex, and acts as a channel for regulatory signals. TFIID is composed of the TATA-binding protein (TBP) and a group of evolutionarily conserved proteins known as TBP-associated factors or TAFs. TAFs may participate in basal transcription, serve as coactivators, function in promoter recognition or modify general transcription factors (GTFs) to facilitate complex assembly and transcription initiation. This gene encodes a protein that serves the same function as TBP and substitutes for TBP at some promoters that are not recognized by TFIID. It is essential for spermiogenesis and believed to be important in expression of developmentally regulated genes.

== Interactions ==
TBPL1 has been shown to interact with GTF2A1.
