= Transcription factor II E =

Transcription factor

general transcription factor IIE, polypeptide 1, alpha 56kDa

Identifiers
- Symbol: GTF2E1
- Alt. symbols: TF2E1
- NCBI gene: 2960
- HGNC: 4650
- OMIM: 189962
- RefSeq: NM_005513
- UniProt: P29083

Other data
- Locus: Chr. 3 q21-q24
Search for
- Structures: Swiss-model
- Domains: InterPro

general transcription factor IIE, polypeptide 2, beta 34kDa

Identifiers
- Symbol: GTF2E2
- Alt. symbols: TF2E2
- NCBI gene: 2961
- HGNC: 4651
- OMIM: 189964
- RefSeq: NM_002095
- UniProt: P29084

Other data
- Locus: Chr. 8 p12
Search for
- Structures: Swiss-model
- Domains: InterPro

Transcription factor II E (TF_{II}E) is one of several general transcription factors that make up the RNA polymerase II preinitiation complex. It is a tetramer of two alpha and two beta chains and interacts with TAF6/TAFII80, ATF7IP, and varicella-zoster virus IE63 protein.

TF_{II}E recruits TF_{II}H to the initiation complex and stimulates the RNA polymerase II C-terminal domain kinase and DNA-dependent ATPase activities of TF_{II}H. Both TF_{II}H and TF_{II}E are required for promoter clearance by RNA polymerase. Transcription factor II E is encoded by the GTF2E1 and GTF2E2 genes. TF_{II}E is thought to be involved in DNA melting at the promoter: it contains a zinc ribbon motif that can bind single stranded DNA.

== See also ==
- TF_{II}H
- TF_{II}B
- TF_{II}D
