= Transcription factor II B =

Mammalian protein found in humans

GTF2B
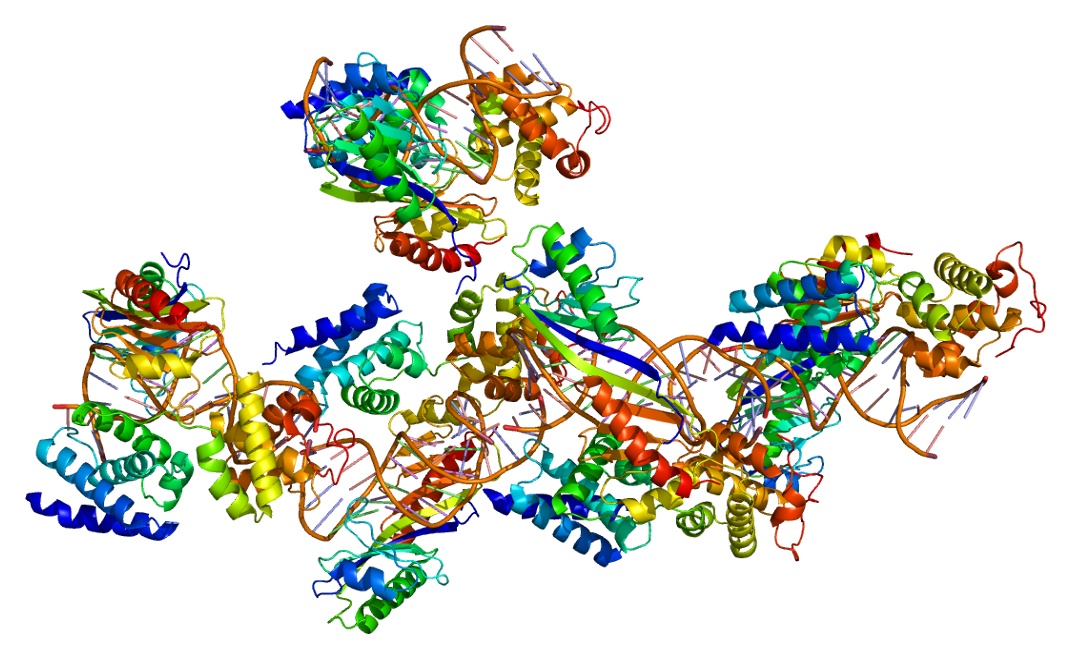

Identifiers
- Aliases: GTF2B, TF2B, TFIIB, general transcription factor IIB
- External IDs: OMIM: 189963; MGI: 2385191; GeneCards: GTF2B
Available structures
PDB	Ortholog search: PDBe RCSB
PDB	List of PDB id codes 1C9B, 1DL6, 1RLY, 1RO4, 1TFB, 1VOL, 2PHG, 5IY7, 5IYA, 5IY6, 5IY9, 5IYB, 5IYD, 5IY8, 5IYC
Enzyme activity
EC #	BRENDA	ExPASy	KEGG	MetaCyc
2.3.1.48	↗	↗	↗	↗

Gene location (Human)
Chr.	Chromosome 1 (human)
Band	1p22.2	Start	88,852,633 bp
Band	1p22.2	End	88,891,944 bp

Gene location (Mouse)
Chr.	Chromosome 3 (mouse)
Band	3|3 H1	Start	142,470,806 bp
Band	3|3 H1	End	142,489,367 bp
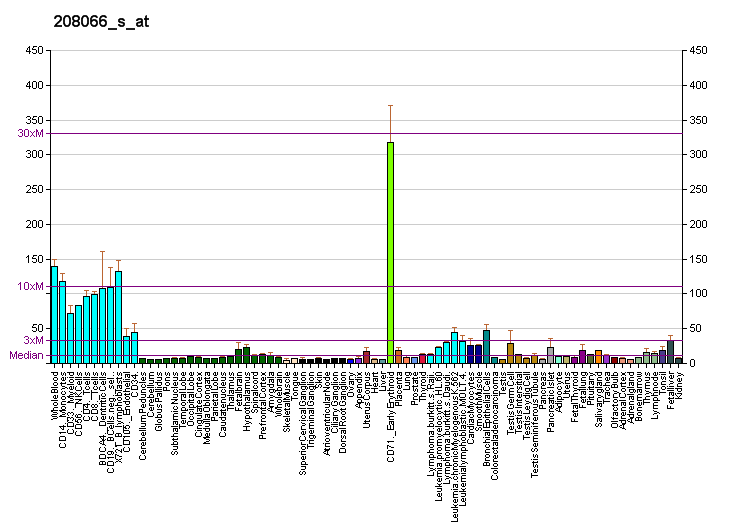
RNA expression pattern
Bgee	Human / Mouse (ortholog); Top expressed in: oocyte; secondary oocyte; Achilles tendon; gingival epithelium; epithelium of nasopharynx; bone marrow; islet of Langerhans; olfactory zone of nasal mucosa; mucosa of sigmoid colon; palpebral conjunctiva / Top expressed in: primary oocyte; zygote; secondary oocyte; spermatocyte; spermatid; medial ganglionic eminence; primitive streak; Paneth cell; jejunum; facial motor nucleus; More reference expression data
BioGPS	More reference expression data
Gene ontology
Molecular function	DNA binding; transcription factor binding; protein binding; metal ion binding; thyroid hormone receptor binding; TBP-class protein binding; RNA polymerase II complex binding; acetyltransferase activity; promoter-specific chromatin binding; RNA polymerase II core promoter sequence-specific DNA binding; zinc ion binding; histone acetyltransferase activity; transferase activity; acyltransferase activity; RNA polymerase II complex recruiting activity; RNA polymerase II general transcription initiation factor activity
Cellular component	nucleus; nucleoplasm; transcription factor TFIID complex; nuclear body; transcription preinitiation complex; chromosome; protein-DNA complex; RNA polymerase II transcription regulator complex
Biological process	regulation of transcription, DNA-templated; transcription, DNA-templated; positive regulation of viral transcription; snRNA transcription by RNA polymerase II; viral process; transcription preinitiation complex assembly; positive regulation of core promoter binding; transcription initiation from RNA polymerase II promoter; protein acetylation; positive regulation by host of viral transcription; positive regulation of transcription initiation from RNA polymerase II promoter; transcriptional start site selection at RNA polymerase II promoter; transcription by RNA polymerase II; RNA polymerase II preinitiation complex assembly; RNA polymerase II core complex assembly; histone acetylation; DNA-templated transcription, initiation
Sources:Amigo / QuickGO
Orthologs
Databases	NCBI: entry; OMA: entry
Species	Human	Mouse
Entrez	2959	229906
Ensembl	ENSG00000137947	ENSMUSG00000028271
UniProt	Q00403	P62915
RefSeq (mRNA)	NM_001514	NM_145546
RefSeq (protein)	NP_001505	NP_663521
Location (UCSC)	Chr 1: 88.85 – 88.89 Mb	Chr 3: 142.47 – 142.49 Mb
PubMed search
- Wikidata
View/Edit Human	View/Edit Mouse

Transcription factor II B (TFIIB) is a general transcription factor that is involved in the formation of the RNA polymerase II preinitiation complex (PIC) and aids in stimulating transcription initiation. TFIIB is localised to the nucleus and provides a platform for PIC formation by binding and stabilising the DNA-TBP (TATA-binding protein) complex and by recruiting RNA polymerase II and other transcription factors. It is encoded by the TFIIB gene, and is homologous to archaeal transcription factor B and analogous to bacterial sigma factors.

== Structure ==
TFIIB is a single 33kDa polypeptide consisting of 316 amino acids. TFIIB is made up of four functional regions: the C-terminal core domain; the B linker; the B reader and the amino terminal zinc ribbon.

TFIIB makes protein-protein interactions with the TATA-binding protein (TBP) subunit of transcription factor IID, and the RPB1 subunit of RNA polymerase II.

TFIIB makes sequence-specific protein–DNA interactions with the B recognition element (BRE), a promoter element flanking the TATA element.

== Mechanism of action ==
There are six steps in the mechanism of TFIIB action in the formation of the PIC and transcription initiation:

1. RNA polymerase II is recruited to DNA through the TFIIB B core and B ribbon.
2. RNA polymerase II unwinds DNA, aided by the TFIIB B linker and B reader (open complex formation).
3. RNA polymerase II selects a transcription start site, aided by the TFIIB B reader.
4. RNA polymerase II forms the first phosphodiester bond.
5. RNA polymerase II produces short abortive transcripts due to clashes between nascent RNA and the TFIIB B reader loop.
6. Extension of nascent RNA to 12–13 nucleotides leads to ejection of TFIIB due to further clashes with TFIIB.

=== Interactions with RNA polymerase II ===
Each of the functional regions of TFIIB interacts with different parts of RNA polymerase II. The amino terminal B ribbon is located on dock domain of RNA polymerase II and extends in to the cleft towards the active site. Extending the B ribbon is the B reader that extends via the RNA exit tunnel to the binding site of the DNA-RNA hybrid and towards the active site. The B linker is the region between the B reader and the B core that is found in the cleft of RNA polymerase II and continues by the rudder and the clamp coiled-coil until it reaches the C terminal B core that is found above the wall of RNA polymerase II. The B reader and the B linker consist of highly conserved residues that are positioned through the RNA polymerase II tunnel towards the active site and ensure tight binding, without these key residues dissociation would occur. These two domains are also thought to adjust the position of some of the more flexible areas of RNA polymerase II to allow for the precise positioning of the DNA and allowing the addition of the new NTPs onto the nascent RNA chain. Upon binding RNA polymerase II, the B reader and B linker cause slight repositioning of the protrusion domain of RNA polymerase II which allows an essential second magnesium ion to bind in the active site. It forms a beta sheet and an ordered loop that helps with the stability of the structure when transcription is initiated.

=== Open and closed complexes ===
The open and closed conformations refer to the state of the DNA and whether the template strand has been separated from the non-template strand within the PIC. The place at which the DNA opens to form the bubble lies above a tunnel that is lined by the B-core, B-linker and B-reader as well as parts of RNA polymerase II. The B linker is found directly aligned with the point at which the DNA opens and in the open complex it is found between the two DNA strands, suggesting that it has a role in promoter melting, but it does not have a role in the catalytic RNA synthesis. Although TFIIB keeps a similar structure in both conformations some of the intramolecular interactions between the core and the B reader are disrupted upon DNA opening.

After DNA melting the transcription initiator (Inr) must be located on the DNA so the TSS can be identified by the RNA polymerase II and transcription can begin. This is done by passing the DNA through the 'template tunnel' and the DNA is scanned, looking for the Inr and placing it in a position that ensures the transcription start site is located in the correct place by the RNA polymerase active site. The B reader of TFIIB is found in the template tunnel and is important in locating the Inr, mutations in the B reader cause the TSS to change and therefore incorrect transcription to occur (although PIC formation and DNA melting still take place). Yeast are a particularly good example of this alignment as the yeast Inr motif has a strictly conserved A residue at position 28 and in the open complex model a complementary T residue can be found in the B reader helix. When this T residue is mutated, transcription was significantly less effective emphasizing the role of the B reader.

The B reader loop is further thought to stabilise NTPs in the active site and, due to its flexibility, allow the nucleic acids to remain in contact during the early synthesis of the RNA molecule (i.e. stabilises the growing RNA-DNA hybrid)

=== Release ===
When the RNA transcript reaches 7 nucleotides long, transcription enters the elongation phase, the beginning of which is characterised by the collapsing of the DNA bubble and the ejection of TFIIB. This is thought to be because the nascent RNA clashes with the B linker helix when it is 6 bases long and upon further elongation to 12–13 bases it will clash with the B-reader and B-ribbon leading to dissociation. The DNA duplex also clashes with the B linker above the rudder (caused by rewinding of the DNA into a double helix).

== Phosphorylation ==
TFIIB is phosphorylated at serine 65 which is found in the B reader domain. Without this phosphorylation, transcription initiation does not occur. It has been suggested that the general transcription factor TFIIH could act as the kinase for this phosphorylation although more evidence is needed to support this. Although TFIIB does not travel with the RNA polymerase II complex along the DNA during elongation, it has been recently suggested that it has a role in gene looping which links the promoter to the terminator of the gene. however, recent research has shown that a depletion in TFIIB is not lethal to cells and transcription levels are not significantly affected. This is because over 90% of mammalian promoters do not contain a BRE (B recognition element) or TATA box sequence which are required for TFIIB to bind. In addition to this, TFIIB levels have been shown to fluctuate in different types of cell, and at different points in the cell cycle, supporting the evidence that it is not required for all RNA polymerase II transcription. Gene looping is reliant on the interaction between phosphorylated serine residues found on the C terminal domain of RNA polymerase II and polyadenylation factors. TFIIB is needed for the interaction of promoters with these polyadenylation factors, such as SSu72 and CstF-64. It has also been suggested that both gene loop formation and the collapse of the DNA bubble are a result of TFIIB phosphorylation; however, it is unclear whether this gene loop formation is a cause or consequence of transcription initiation.

== Similarities in other transcription complexes ==
RNA polymerase III uses a very similar factor to TFIIB called Brf (TFIIB-related factor) which also contains a conserved zinc ribbon and C terminal core. However, the structure diverges in the more flexible linker region although Brf still contains highly conserved sequences in the same positions that the B reader and B linker are found. These conserved regions probably carry out similar functions as the domains in TFIIB. RNA polymerase I does not use a factor that is similar to TFIIB; however, it is thought that another unknown factor fulfils the same function. There is no direct homologue for TFIIB in bacterial systems but there are proteins that bind the bacterial polymerase in a similar manner with no sequence similarity. In particular the bacterial protein σ70 contains domains that bind the polymerase at the same points as the B-linker, B-ribbon and B-core. This is especially apparent in the σ 3 region and the region 4 linker which might stabilise the DNA in the polymerase active site.

== Clinical significance ==
=== Antiviral activity ===
Recent studies have shown that decreased TFIIB levels do not affect transcription levels within cells, this is thought to be partially because over 90% of mammalian promoters do not contain a BRE or TATA box. However, it has been shown that TFIIB is vital to the in vitro transcription and regulation of the herpes simplex virus. This is thought to be due to similarity TFIIB has to cyclin A. In order to undergo replication, viruses often stop host cell progression through the cell cycle, using cyclins and other proteins. As TFIIB has a similar structure to cyclin A it has been suggested that depleted levels of TFIIB could have antiviral effects.

=== Neurodegeneration ===
Studies have shown that the binding of TFIIB to TBP is affected by the length of the polyglutamine tract in TBP. Extended polyglutamine tracts such as those found in neurodegenerative diseases cause increased interaction with TFIIB. This is thought to affect transcription in these diseases as it reduces the availability of TFIIB to other promoters in the brain as the TFIIB is instead interacting with the expanded polyglutamine tracts.
