= Nuclear factor I =

Family of transcription factors

Nuclear factor I (NF-I or NFI) is a family of closely related transcription factors. The family has also been referred to as the CTF family and the CAAT box transcription factor family. They constitutively bind as dimers to specific sequences of DNA with high affinity. Family members contain an unusual DNA binding domain that binds to the recognition sequence 5'-TTGGCXXXXXGCCAA-3'.

An NFI member was first described as being required for Adenovirus replication, and members are now known to be involved in the replication of multiple viruses and in regulation of both ubiquitously expressed and hormonally, nutritionally and developmentally regulated genes, at least in mice.

Family members include:

- NFIA
- NFIB
- NFIC
- NFIX
