= RFX =

RFX may refer to:

- Reversed-Field eXperiment, a reversed field pinch nuclear fusion device
- The collective term for a request for information (RFI), request for proposal (RFP), or request for quotation (RFQ)
- J P Hunt Air Carriers (ICAO airline code: RFX) aka REFLEX, U.S. airline: see List of airline codes (J)
- The regulatory factor X (RFX) gene and protein family:
  - RFX1 gene and protein
  - RFX2 gene and protein
  - RFX3 gene and protein
  - RFX4 gene and protein
  - RFX5 gene and protein
  - RFX6 gene and protein
