= Transcription factor =

Protein that regulates the rate of DNA transcription

Transcription factor glossary
- gene expression – the process by which information from a gene is used in the synthesis of a functional gene product such as a protein; transcription – the process of making messenger RNA (mRNA) from a DNA template by RNA polymerase; transcription factor – a protein that binds to DNA and regulates gene expression by promoting or suppressing transcription; transcriptional regulation – controlling the rate of gene transcription for example by helping or hindering RNA polymerase binding to DNA; upregulation, activation, or promotion – increase the rate of gene transcription; downregulation, repression, or suppression – decrease the rate of gene transcription; coactivator – a protein (or a small molecule) that works with transcription factors to increase the rate of gene transcription; corepressor – a protein (or a small molecule) that works with transcription factors to decrease the rate of gene transcription; response element – a specific sequence of DNA that a transcription factor binds to

Illustration of an activator

In molecular biology, a transcription factor (TF) (or sequence-specific DNA-binding factor) is a protein that controls the rate of transcription of genetic information from DNA to messenger RNA, by binding to DNA sequences. Specificity can be due to sequence motifs, or epigenetic modifications. The function of TFs is to regulate—turn on and off—genes in order to make sure that they are expressed in the desired cells at the right time and in the right amount throughout the life of the cell and the organism. Groups of TFs function in a coordinated fashion to direct cell division, cell growth, and cell death throughout life; cell migration and organization (body plan) during embryonic development; and intermittently in response to signals from outside the cell, such as a hormone. There are approximately 1600 TFs in the human genome, where half of them are C2H2 zinc fingers. Transcription factors are members of the proteome as well as regulome.

TFs work alone or with other proteins in a complex, by promoting (as an activator), or blocking (as a repressor) the recruitment of RNA polymerase (the enzyme that performs the transcription of genetic information from DNA to RNA) to specific genes.

A defining feature of TFs is that they contain at least one DNA-binding domain (DBD), which attaches to a specific sequence of DNA adjacent to the genes that they regulate. TFs are grouped into classes based on their DBDs. Other proteins such as coactivators, chromatin remodelers, histone acetyltransferases, histone deacetylases, kinases, and methylases are also essential to gene regulation, but lack DNA-binding domains, and therefore are not TFs.

TFs are of interest in medicine because TF mutations can cause specific diseases, and medications can be potentially targeted toward them.

== Number ==
Transcription factors are essential for the regulation of gene expression and are, as a consequence, found in all living organisms. The number of transcription factors found within an organism increases with genome size, and larger genomes tend to have more transcription factors per gene.

There are approximately 2800 proteins in the human genome that contain DNA-binding domains, and 1600 of these are presumed to function as transcription factors, where half of them (~800) are C2H2 zinc finger proteins. Therefore, approximately 10% of genes in the genome code for transcription factors, which makes this family the single largest family of human proteins. Furthermore, genes are often flanked by several binding sites for distinct transcription factors, and efficient expression of each of these genes requires the cooperative action of several different transcription factors (see, for example, hepatocyte nuclear factors). Hence, the combinatorial use of a subset of the approximately 2000 human transcription factors easily accounts for the unique regulation of each gene in the human genome during development.

== Mechanism ==
Transcription factors bind to either enhancer or promoter regions of DNA adjacent to the genes that they regulate based on recognizing specific DNA motifs. Depending on the transcription factor, the transcription of the adjacent gene is either up- or down-regulated. Transcription factors use a variety of mechanisms for the regulation of gene expression. These mechanisms include:

- stabilize or block the binding of RNA polymerase or other factors to DNA
- catalyze the acetylation or deacetylation of histone proteins. The transcription factor can either do this directly or recruit other proteins with this catalytic activity. Many transcription factors use one or the other of two opposing mechanisms to regulate transcription:
  - histone acetyltransferase (HAT) activity – acetylates histone proteins, which weakens the association of DNA with histones, which make the DNA more accessible to transcription, thereby up-regulating transcription
  - histone deacetylase (HDAC) activity – deacetylates histone proteins, which strengthens the association of DNA with histones, which make the DNA less accessible to transcription, thereby down-regulating transcription
- recruit coactivator or corepressor proteins to the transcription factor DNA complex

== Function ==
Transcription factors are one of the groups of proteins that read and interpret the genetic "blueprint" in the DNA. They bind to the DNA and help initiate a program of increased or decreased gene transcription. As such, they are vital for many important cellular processes. Below are some of the important functions and biological roles transcription factors are involved in:

=== Basal transcriptional regulation ===
In eukaryotes, an important class of transcription factors called general transcription factors (GTFs) are necessary for transcription to occur. Many of these GTFs do not actually bind DNA, but rather are part of the large transcription preinitiation complex that interacts with RNA polymerase directly. The most common GTFs are TFIIA, TFIIB, TFIID (see also TATA binding protein), TFIIE, TFIIF, and TFIIH. The preinitiation complex binds to promoter regions of DNA upstream to the gene that they regulate.

=== Differential enhancement of transcription ===
Other transcription factors differentially regulate the expression of various genes by binding to enhancer regions of DNA adjacent to regulated genes. These transcription factors are critical to making sure that genes are expressed in the right cell at the right time and in the right amount, depending on the changing requirements of the organism.

==== Development ====
Many transcription factors in multicellular organisms are involved in development. Responding to stimuli, these transcription factors turn on/off the transcription of the appropriate genes, which, in turn, allows for changes in cell morphology or activities needed for cell fate determination and cellular differentiation. The Hox transcription factor family, for example, is important for proper body pattern formation in organisms as diverse as fruit flies to humans. Another example is the transcription factor sex-determining region Y protein encoded by the SRY gene, which plays a major role in determining sex in humans.

==== Response to intercellular signals ====
Cells can communicate with each other by releasing molecules that produce signaling cascades within another receptive cell. If the signal requires upregulation or downregulation of genes in the recipient cell, often transcription factors will be downstream in the signaling cascade. Estrogen signaling is an example of a fairly short signaling cascade that involves the estrogen receptor transcription factor: Estrogen is secreted by tissues such as the ovaries and placenta, crosses the cell membrane of the recipient cell, and is bound by the estrogen receptor in the cell's cytoplasm. The estrogen receptor then goes to the cell's nucleus and binds to its DNA-binding sites, changing the transcriptional regulation of the associated genes.

==== Response to environment ====
Not only do transcription factors act downstream of signaling cascades related to biological stimuli but they can also be downstream of signaling cascades involved in environmental stimuli. Examples include heat shock factor (HSF), which upregulates genes necessary for survival at higher temperatures, hypoxia inducible factor (HIF), which upregulates genes necessary for cell survival in low-oxygen environments, and sterol regulatory element binding protein (SREBP), which helps maintain proper lipid levels in the cell.

==== Cell cycle control ====
Many transcription factors, especially some that are proto-oncogenes or tumor suppressors, help regulate the cell cycle and as such determine how large a cell will get and when it can divide into two daughter cells. One example is the Myc oncogene, which has important roles in cell growth and apoptosis.

==== Pathogenesis ====
Transcription factors can also be used to alter gene expression in a host cell to promote pathogenesis. A well studied example of this are the transcription-activator like effectors (TAL effectors) secreted by Xanthomonas bacteria. When injected into plants, these proteins can enter the nucleus of the plant cell, bind plant promoter sequences, and activate transcription of plant genes that aid in bacterial infection. TAL effectors contain a central repeat region in which there is a simple relationship between the identity of two critical residues in sequential repeats and sequential DNA bases in the TAL effector's target site. This property likely makes it easier for these proteins to evolve in order to better compete with the defense mechanisms of the host cell.

== Regulation ==
It is common in biology for important processes to have multiple layers of regulation and control. This is also true with transcription factors: Not only do transcription factors control the rates of transcription to regulate the amounts of gene products (RNA and protein) available to the cell but transcription factors themselves are regulated (often by other transcription factors). Below is a brief synopsis of some of the ways that the activity of transcription factors can be regulated:

=== Synthesis ===
Transcription factors (like all proteins) are transcribed from a gene on a chromosome into RNA, and then the RNA is translated into protein. Any of these steps can be regulated to affect the production (and thus activity) of a transcription factor. An implication of this is that transcription factors can regulate themselves. For example, in a negative feedback loop, the transcription factor acts as its own repressor: If the transcription factor protein binds the DNA of its own gene, it down-regulates the production of more of itself. This is one mechanism to maintain low levels of a transcription factor in a cell.

=== Nuclear localization ===
In eukaryotes, transcription factors (like most proteins) are transcribed in the nucleus but are then translated in the cell's cytoplasm. Many proteins that are active in the nucleus contain nuclear localization signals that direct them to the nucleus. But, for many transcription factors, this is a key point in their regulation. Important classes of transcription factors such as some nuclear receptors must first bind a ligand while in the cytoplasm before they can relocate to the nucleus.

=== Activation ===
Transcription factors may be activated or deactivated through their signal-sensing or effector domains. However, not all transcription factors have an effector domain; for example, approximately 400 C2H2 zinc finger transcription factors contain only DNA-binding domains (DBDs). Activation or repression of transcription factors can occur through a number of mechanisms, including:

- ligand binding – Not only is ligand binding able to influence where a transcription factor is located within a cell but ligand binding can also affect whether the transcription factor is in an active state and capable of binding DNA or other cofactors (see, for example, nuclear receptors).
- phosphorylation – Many transcription factors such as STAT proteins must be phosphorylated before they can bind DNA.
- interaction with other transcription factors (e.g., homo- or hetero-dimerization)
- interacting with coregulatory proteins such as co-activators (e.g., COPS5, EP300, BCL3); co-repressors (e.g., NCOR1, SIN3A, TRIM24). However, there are transcription co-regulators that can act as both, activator and repressors.

=== Accessibility of dna-binding site ===
In eukaryotes, DNA is organized with the help of histones into compact particles called nucleosomes, where sequences of about 147 DNA base pairs make ~1.65 turns around histone protein octamers. DNA within nucleosomes is inaccessible to many transcription factors. Some transcription factors, so-called pioneer factors are still able to bind their DNA binding sites on the nucleosomal DNA. For most other transcription factors, the nucleosome should be actively unwound by molecular motors such as chromatin remodelers. Alternatively, the nucleosome can be partially unwrapped by thermal fluctuations, allowing temporary access to the transcription factor binding site. In many cases, a transcription factor needs to compete for binding to its DNA binding site with other transcription factors and histones or non-histone chromatin proteins. Pairs of transcription factors and other proteins can play antagonistic roles (activator versus repressor) in the regulation of the same gene.

=== Availability of other cofactors/transcription factors ===
Most transcription factors do not work alone. Many large TF families form complex homotypic or heterotypic interactions through dimerization. For gene transcription to occur, a number of transcription factors must bind to DNA regulatory sequences. This collection of transcription factors, in turn, recruit intermediary proteins such as cofactors that allow efficient recruitment of the preinitiation complex and RNA polymerase. Thus, for a single transcription factor to initiate transcription, all of these other proteins must also be present, and the transcription factor must be in a state where it can bind to them if necessary. Cofactors are proteins that modulate the effects of transcription factors. Cofactors are interchangeable between specific gene promoters; the protein complex that occupies the promoter DNA and the amino acid sequence of the cofactor determine its spatial conformation. For example, certain steroid receptors can exchange cofactors with NF-κB, which is a switch between inflammation and cellular differentiation; thereby steroids can affect the inflammatory response and function of certain tissues.

=== Interaction with methylated cytosine ===
Transcription factors and methylated cytosines in DNA both have major roles in regulating gene expression. (Methylation of cytosine in DNA primarily occurs where cytosine is followed by guanine in the 5' to 3' DNA sequence, a CpG site.) Methylation of CpG sites in a promoter region of a gene usually represses gene transcription, while methylation of CpGs in the body of a gene increases expression. TET enzymes play a central role in demethylation of methylated cytosines. Demethylation of CpGs in a gene promoter by TET enzyme activity increases transcription of the gene.

The DNA binding sites of 519 transcription factors were evaluated. Of these, 169 transcription factors (33%) did not have CpG dinucleotides in their binding sites, and 33 transcription factors (6%) could bind to a CpG-containing motif but did not display a preference for a binding site with either a methylated or unmethylated CpG. There were 117 transcription factors (23%) that were inhibited from binding to their binding sequence if it contained a methylated CpG site, 175 transcription factors (34%) that had enhanced binding if their binding sequence had a methylated CpG site, and 25 transcription factors (5%) were either inhibited or had enhanced binding depending on where in the binding sequence the methylated CpG was located.

TET enzymes do not specifically bind to methylcytosine except when recruited (see DNA demethylation). Multiple transcription factors important in cell differentiation and lineage specification, including NANOG, SALL4A, WT1, EBF1, PU.1, and E2A, have been shown to recruit TET enzymes to specific genomic loci (primarily enhancers) to act on methylcytosine (mC) and convert it to hydroxymethylcytosine hmC (and in most cases marking them for subsequent complete demethylation to cytosine). TET-mediated conversion of mC to hmC appears to disrupt the binding of 5mC-binding proteins including MECP2 and MBD (Methyl-CpG-binding domain) proteins, facilitating nucleosome remodeling and the binding of transcription factors, thereby activating transcription of those genes. EGR1 is an important transcription factor in memory formation. It has an essential role in brain neuron epigenetic reprogramming. The transcription factor EGR1 recruits the TET1 protein that initiates a pathway of DNA demethylation. EGR1, together with TET1, is employed in programming the distribution of methylation sites on brain DNA during brain development and in learning (see Epigenetics in learning and memory).

== Structure ==
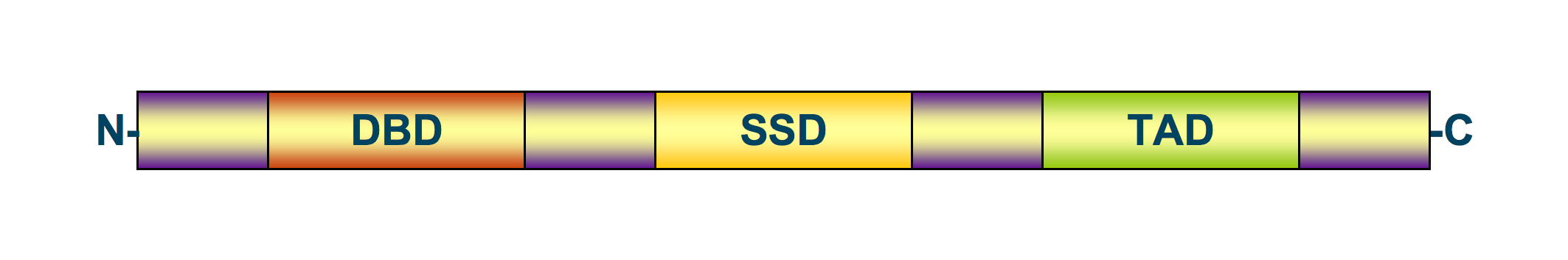
Schematic diagram of the amino acid sequence (amino terminus to the left and carboxylic acid terminus to the right) of a prototypical transcription factor that contains (1) a DNA-binding domain (DBD), (2) signal-sensing domain (SSD), and Activation domain (AD). The order of placement and the number of domains may differ in various types of transcription factors. In addition, the transactivation and signal-sensing functions are frequently contained within the same domain.

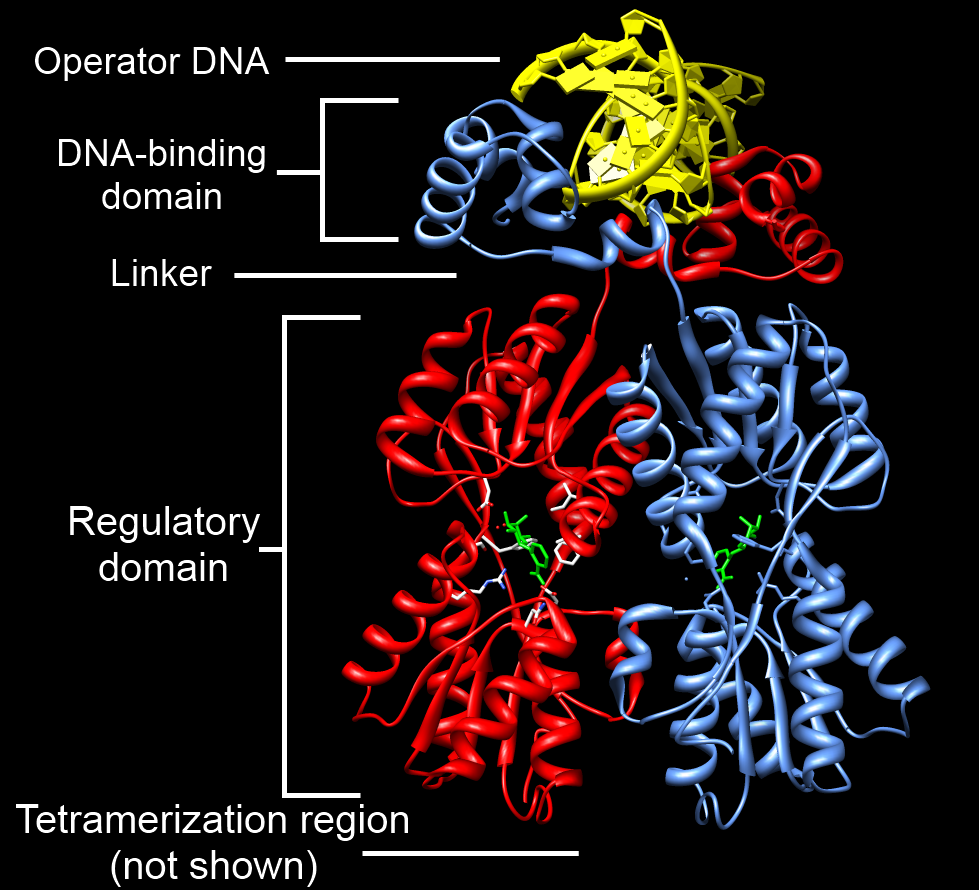
Domain architecture example: Lactose Repressor (LacI). The N-terminal DNA binding domain (labeled) of the lac repressor binds its target DNA sequence (gold) in the major groove using a helix-turn-helix motif. Effector molecule binding (green) occurs in the regulatory domain (labeled). This triggers an allosteric response mediated by the linker region (labeled).

Transcription factors are modular in structure and contain the following domains:

- DNA-binding domain (DBD), which attaches to specific sequences of DNA (enhancer or promoter. Necessary component for all vectors. Used to drive transcription of the vector's transgene promoter sequences) adjacent to regulated genes. DNA sequences that bind transcription factors are often referred to as response elements. Sometimes, DBDs can directly recruit transcription coregulators without the need of an activation domain.
- Activation domain (AD), which contains binding sites for other proteins such as transcription coregulators. These binding sites are frequently referred to as activation functions (AFs), Transactivation domain (TAD) or Trans-activating domain TAD, not to be confused with topologically associating domain (TAD). However, not all TFs have an activation domain (e.g., half of them (~800) are C2H2 zinc finger proteins)
- An optional signal-sensing domain (SSD) (e.g., a ligand-binding domain), which senses external signals and, in response, transmits these signals to the rest of the transcription complex, resulting in up- or down-regulation of gene expression. Also, the DBD and signal-sensing domains may reside on separate proteins that associate within the transcription complex to regulate gene expression.

=== Dna-binding domain ===
DNA contacts of different types of DNA-binding domains of transcription factors

The portion (domain) of the transcription factor that binds DNA is called its DNA-binding domain. Below is a partial list of some of the major families of DNA-binding domains/transcription factors:

Family	InterPro	Pfam	SCOP
basic helix-loop-helix	InterPro: IPR001092	Pfam PF00010	SCOP 47460
basic-leucine zipper (bZIP)	InterPro: IPR004827	Pfam PF00170	SCOP 57959
C-terminal effector domain of the bipartite response regulators	InterPro: IPR001789	Pfam PF00072	SCOP 46894
AP2/ERF/GCC box	InterPro: IPR001471	Pfam PF00847	SCOP 54176
helix-turn-helix			
homeodomain proteins, which are encoded by homeobox genes, are transcription factors. Homeodomain proteins play critical roles in the regulation of development.	InterPro: IPR009057	Pfam PF00046	SCOP 46689
lambda repressor-like	InterPro: IPR010982		SCOP 47413
srf-like (serum response factor)	InterPro: IPR002100	Pfam PF00319	SCOP 55455
paired box			
winged helix	InterPro: IPR013196	Pfam PF08279	SCOP 46785
zinc fingers			
* multi-domain Cys_{2}His_{2} zinc fingers	InterPro: IPR007087	Pfam PF00096	SCOP 57667
* Zn_{2}/Cys_{6}			SCOP 57701
* Zn_{2}/Cys_{8} nuclear receptor zinc finger	InterPro: IPR001628	Pfam PF00105	SCOP 57716

=== Response elements ===
The DNA sequence that a transcription factor binds to is called a transcription factor-binding site or response element.

Transcription factors interact with their binding sites using a combination of electrostatic (of which hydrogen bonds are a special case) and Van der Waals forces. Due to the nature of these chemical interactions, most transcription factors bind DNA in a sequence specific manner. However, not all bases in the transcription factor-binding site may actually interact with the transcription factor. In addition, some of these interactions may be weaker than others. Thus, transcription factors do not bind just one sequence but are capable of binding a subset of closely related sequences, each with a different strength of interaction.

For example, although the consensus binding site for the TATA-binding protein (TBP) is TATAAAA, the TBP transcription factor can also bind similar sequences such as TATATAT or TATATAA.

Because transcription factors can bind a set of related sequences and these sequences tend to be short, potential transcription factor binding sites can occur by chance if the DNA sequence is long enough. It is unlikely, however, that a transcription factor will bind all compatible sequences in the genome of the cell. Other constraints, such as DNA accessibility in the cell or availability of cofactors may also help dictate where a transcription factor will actually bind. Thus, given the genome sequence, it is still difficult to predict where a transcription factor will actually bind in a living cell.

Additional recognition specificity, however, may be obtained through the use of more than one DNA-binding domain (for example tandem DBDs in the same transcription factor or through dimerization of two transcription factors) that bind to two or more adjacent sequences of DNA.

== Clinical significance ==
Transcription factors are of clinical significance for at least two reasons: (1) mutations can be associated with specific diseases, and (2) they can be targets of medications.

=== Disorders ===
Due to their important roles in development, intercellular signaling, and cell cycle, some human diseases have been associated with mutations in transcription factors.

Many transcription factors are either tumor suppressors or oncogenes, and, thus, mutations or aberrant regulation of them is associated with cancer. Three groups of transcription factors are known to be important in human cancer: (1) the NF-kappaB and AP-1 families, (2) the STAT family and (3) the steroid receptors.

Below are a few of the better-studied examples:

Condition	Description	Locus
Rett syndrome	Mutations in the MECP2 transcription factor are associated with Rett syndrome, a neurodevelopmental disorder.	Xq28
Diabetes	A rare form of diabetes called MODY (Maturity onset diabetes of the young) can be caused by mutations in hepatocyte nuclear factors (HNFs) or insulin promoter factor-1 (IPF1/Pdx1).	multiple
Developmental verbal dyspraxia	Mutations in the FOXP2 transcription factor are associated with developmental verbal dyspraxia, a disease in which individuals are unable to produce the finely coordinated movements required for speech.	7q31
Autoimmune diseases	Mutations in the FOXP3 transcription factor cause a rare form of autoimmune disease called IPEX.	Xp11.23-q13.3
Li-Fraumeni syndrome	Caused by mutations in the tumor suppressor p53.	17p13.1
Breast cancer	The STAT family is relevant to breast cancer.	multiple
Multiple cancers	The HOX family are involved in a variety of cancers.	multiple
Osteoarthritis	Mutation or reduced activity of SOX9	

=== Potential drug targets ===
Approximately 10% of currently prescribed drugs directly target the nuclear receptor class of transcription factors. Examples include tamoxifen and bicalutamide for the treatment of breast and prostate cancer, respectively, and various types of anti-inflammatory and anabolic steroids. In addition, transcription factors are often indirectly modulated by drugs through signaling cascades. It might be possible to directly target other less-explored transcription factors such as NF-κB with drugs. Transcription factors outside the nuclear receptor family are thought to be more difficult to target with small molecule therapeutics since it is not clear that they are "drugable" but progress has been made on Pax2 and the notch pathway.

== Role in evolution ==
=== Gene duplications ===
Gene duplications have played a crucial role in the evolution of species and many transcription factors exist as numerous copies across genomes. For instance, the human genome encodes about 160 homeobox proteins, most of which are transcription factors and thought to have arisen through gene duplications.

=== Change in DNA binding specificity ===
Transcription factors (TFs) can evolve by changing their DNA binding specificity. For instance, the human transcription factor Max binds to the sequence CACGTG with 3 amino acids contacting the first three bases. When the first of these amino acids, Arg-14 is changed to Tyr-14 the binding specificity changes to CATATG. Changing Arg-14 to Met-14 changes the binding specificity to CAGCTG etc. This shows that small changes in TFs can substantially change the specificity and thus the target genes (and therefore the function) of a TF.

=== Effect of transcription factor loss ===
Given that transcription factors (TFs) regulate other genes, a common assumption is that many transcription factors must be essential and thus cannot be deleted. This is not true. For instance, 182 yeast proteins have been shown or are presumed to bind specific DNA sequences and thus are probably TFs (not all of them have been thoroughly tested for this activity though). Among these 182 proteins, 171 gene-specific transcription factors (GSTF) were identified and deleted from the yeast genome. 54% of these deletions do not strongly affect gene expression (under one tested growth condition) although a median of 19 genes changed their expression levels to some extent (with 55% of TFs being activators and 39% being repressors). In other words, gene regulatory networks appear to be highly resilient to perturbation, even when the gene regulators are completely deleted.

== Role in biocontrol activity ==
The transcription factors have a role in resistance activity which is important for successful biocontrol activity. The resistant to oxidative stress and alkaline pH sensing were contributed from the transcription factor Yap1 and Rim101 of the Papiliotrema terrestris LS28 as molecular tools revealed an understanding of the genetic mechanisms underlying the biocontrol activity which supports disease management programs based on biological and integrated control.

== Analysis ==
There are different technologies available to analyze transcription factors. On the genomic level, DNA-sequencing and database research are commonly used. The protein version of the transcription factor is detectable by using specific antibodies. The sample is detected on a western blot. By using electrophoretic mobility shift assay (EMSA), the activation profile of transcription factors can be detected. A multiplex approach for activation profiling is a TF chip system where several different transcription factors can be detected in parallel.

The most commonly used method for identifying transcription factor binding sites is chromatin immunoprecipitation (ChIP). This technique relies on chemical fixation of chromatin with formaldehyde, followed by co-precipitation of DNA and the transcription factor of interest using an antibody that specifically targets that protein. The DNA sequences can then be identified by microarray or high-throughput sequencing (ChIP-seq) to determine transcription factor binding sites. If no antibody is available for the protein of interest, DamID may be a convenient alternative.

== Classes ==
As described in more detail below, transcription factors may be classified by their (1) mechanism of action, (2) regulatory function, or (3) sequence homology (and hence structural similarity) in their DNA-binding domains. They are also classified by 3D structure of their DBD and the way it contacts DNA.

=== Mechanistic ===
There are two mechanistic classes of transcription factors:

- General transcription factors are involved in the formation of a preinitiation complex. The most common are abbreviated as TFIIA, TFIIB, TFIID, TFIIE, TFIIF, and TFIIH. They are ubiquitous and interact with the core promoter region surrounding the transcription start site(s) of all class II genes.
- Upstream transcription factors are proteins that bind somewhere upstream of the initiation site to stimulate or repress transcription. These are roughly synonymous with specific transcription factors, because they vary considerably depending on what recognition sequences are present in the proximity of the gene.

Examples of specific transcription factors
Factor	Structural type	Recognition sequence	Binds as
SP1	Zinc finger	5'-GGGCGG-3'	Monomer
AP-1	Basic zipper	5'-TGA(G/C)TCA-3'	Dimer
C/EBP	Basic zipper	5'-ATTGCGCAAT-3'	Dimer
Heat shock factor	Basic zipper	5'-XGAAX-3'	Trimer
ATF/CREB	Basic zipper	5'-TGACGTCA-3'	Dimer
c-Myc	Basic helix-loop-helix	5'-CACGTG-3'	Dimer
Oct-1	Helix-turn-helix	5'-ATGCAAAT-3'	Monomer
NF-1	Novel	5'-TTGGCXXXXXGCCAA-3'	Dimer
(G/C) = G or C X = A, T, G or C

=== Functional ===
Transcription factors have been classified according to their regulatory function:

- I. Constitutive – present in all cells at all times, constantly active, all being activators. Very likely playing an important facilitating role in the transcription of many chromosomal genes, possibly in genes that seem to be always transcribed (e.g., structural proteins like tubulin and actin, and ubiquitous metabolic enzymes such as glyceraldehyde phosphate dehydrogenase (GAPDH)). E.g.: general transcription factors, Sp1, NF1, CCAAT
- II. Regulatory (conditionally active) – require activation.
  - II.A Developmental (cell-type specific) – beginning in a fertilized egg. Once expressed, require no additional activation. E.g.:GATA, HNF, PIT-1, MyoD, Myf5, Hox, Winged Helix
  - II.B Signal-dependent – may be either developmentally restricted in their expression or present in most or all cells, but all are inactive (or minimally active) until cells containing such proteins are exposed to the appropriate intra- or extracellular signal.
    - II.B.1 Extracellular ligand (endocrine or paracrine)-dependent – nuclear receptors.
    - II.B.2 Intracellular ligand (autocrine)-dependent – activated by small intracellular molecules. E.g.: SREBP, p53, orphan nuclear receptors.
    - II.B.3 Cell surface receptor-ligand interaction-dependent – activated by second messenger signaling cascades.
      - II.B.3.a Constitutive nuclear factors activated by serine phosphorylation – residing within the nucleus. The serine phosphorylation enzymes can be activated by two main routes:
        - G protein-coupled receptors upon ligand binding increase intracellular levels of second messengers (cAMP, IP_{3}, DAG, calcium) which, in turn, activate protein serine-threonine kinase enzymes (such as PKA, PKC).
        - Receptor tyrosine kinases upon ligand binding trigger other pathways that finally terminate in serine phosphorylation of the abundant resident nuclear transcription factors.
        - Examples include: CREB, AP-1, Mef2
      - II.B.3.b Latent cytoplasmic factors – residing in the cytoplasm when inactive. Structurally and chemically very diverse group, and so are their activation pathways. E.g.: STAT, R-SMAD, NF-κB, Notch, TUBBY, NFAT

=== Structural ===
Transcription factors are often classified based on the sequence similarity and hence the tertiary structure of their DNA-binding domains. The following classification is based on the 3D structure of their DBD and the way it contacts DNA. It was first developed for Human TF and later extended to rodents and also to plants.

- 1 Superclass: Basic Domains
  - 1.1 Class: Leucine zipper factors (bZIP)
    - 1.1.1 Family: AP-1(-like) components; includes (c-Fos/c-Jun)
    - 1.1.2 Family: CREB
    - 1.1.3 Family: C/EBP-like factors
    - 1.1.4 Family: bZIP / PAR
    - 1.1.5 Family: Plant G-box binding factors
    - 1.1.6 Family: ZIP only
  - 1.2 Class: Helix-loop-helix factors (bHLH)
    - 1.2.1 Family: Ubiquitous (class A) factors
    - 1.2.2 Family: Myogenic transcription factors (MyoD)
    - 1.2.3 Family: Achaete-Scute
    - 1.2.4 Family: Tal/Twist/Atonal/Hen
  - 1.3 Class: Helix-loop-helix / leucine zipper factors (bHLH-ZIP)
    - 1.3.1 Family: Ubiquitous bHLH-ZIP factors; includes USF (USF1, USF2); SREBP (SREBP)
    - 1.3.2 Family: Cell-cycle controlling factors; includes c-Myc
  - 1.4 Class: NF-1
    - 1.4.1 Family: NF-1 (A, B, C, X)
  - 1.5 Class: RF-X
    - 1.5.1 Family: RF-X (1, 2, 3, 4, 5, ANK)
  - 1.6 Class: bHSH
- 2 Superclass: Zinc-coordinating DNA-binding domains
  - 2.1 Class: Cys4 zinc finger of nuclear receptor type
    - 2.1.1 Family: Steroid hormone receptors
    - 2.1.2 Family: Thyroid hormone receptor-like factors
  - 2.2 Class: diverse Cys4 zinc fingers
    - 2.2.1 Family: GATA-Factors
  - 2.3 Class: Cys2His2 zinc finger domain
    - 2.3.1 Family: Ubiquitous factors, includes TFIIIA, Sp1
    - 2.3.2 Family: Developmental / cell cycle regulators; includes Krüppel
    - 2.3.4 Family: Large factors with NF-6B-like binding properties
  - 2.4 Class: Cys6 cysteine-zinc cluster
  - 2.5 Class: Zinc fingers of alternating composition
- 3 Superclass: Helix-turn-helix
  - 3.1 Class: Homeo domain
    - 3.1.1 Family: Homeo domain only; includes Ubx
    - 3.1.2 Family: POU domain factors; includes Oct
    - 3.1.3 Family: Homeo domain with LIM region
    - 3.1.4 Family: homeo domain plus zinc finger motifs
  - 3.2 Class: Paired box
    - 3.2.1 Family: Paired plus homeo domain
    - 3.2.2 Family: Paired domain only
  - 3.3 Class: Fork head / winged helix
    - 3.3.1 Family: Developmental regulators; includes forkhead
    - 3.3.2 Family: Tissue-specific regulators
    - 3.3.3 Family: Cell-cycle controlling factors
    - 3.3.0 Family: Other regulators
  - 3.4 Class: Heat Shock Factors
    - 3.4.1 Family: HSF
  - 3.5 Class: Tryptophan clusters
    - 3.5.1 Family: Myb
    - 3.5.2 Family: Ets-type
    - 3.5.3 Family: Interferon regulatory factors
  - 3.6 Class: TEA (transcriptional enhancer factor) domain
    - 3.6.1 Family: TEA (TEAD1, TEAD2, TEAD3, TEAD4)
- 4 Superclass: beta-Scaffold Factors with Minor Groove Contacts
  - 4.1 Class: RHR (Rel homology region)
    - 4.1.1 Family: Rel/ankyrin; NF-kappaB
    - 4.1.2 Family: ankyrin only
    - 4.1.3 Family: NFAT (Nuclear Factor of Activated T-cells) (NFATC1, NFATC2, NFATC3)
  - 4.2 Class: STAT
    - 4.2.1 Family: STAT
  - 4.3 Class: p53
    - 4.3.1 Family: p53
  - 4.4 Class: MADS box
    - 4.4.1 Family: Regulators of differentiation; includes (Mef2)
    - 4.4.2 Family: Responders to external signals, SRF (serum response factor) (SRF)
    - 4.4.3 Family: Metabolic regulators (ARG80)
  - 4.5 Class: beta-Barrel alpha-helix transcription factors
  - 4.6 Class: TATA binding proteins
    - 4.6.1 Family: TBP
  - 4.7 Class: HMG-box
    - 4.7.1 Family: SOX genes, SRY
    - 4.7.2 Family: TCF-1 (TCF1)
    - 4.7.3 Family: HMG2-related, SSRP1
    - 4.7.4 Family: UBF
    - 4.7.5 Family: MATA
  - 4.8 Class: Heteromeric CCAAT factors
    - 4.8.1 Family: Heteromeric CCAAT factors
  - 4.9 Class: Grainyhead
    - 4.9.1 Family: Grainyhead
  - 4.10 Class: Cold-shock domain factors
    - 4.10.1 Family: csd
  - 4.11 Class: Runt
    - 4.11.1 Family: Runt
- 0 Superclass: Other Transcription Factors
  - 0.1 Class: Copper fist proteins
  - 0.2 Class: HMGI(Y) (HMGA1)
    - 0.2.1 Family: HMGI(Y)
  - 0.3 Class: Pocket domain
  - 0.4 Class: E1A-like factors
  - 0.5 Class: AP2/EREBP-related factors
    - 0.5.1 Family: AP2
    - 0.5.2 Family: EREBP
    - 0.5.3 Superfamily: AP2/B3
      - 0.5.3.1 Family: ARF
      - 0.5.3.2 Family: ABI
      - 0.5.3.3 Family: RAV

== Transcription factor databases ==
There are numerous databases cataloging information about transcription factors, but their scope and utility vary dramatically. Some may contain only information about the actual proteins, some about their binding sites, or about their target genes. Examples include the following:

- footprintDB - a metadatabase of multiple databases, including JASPAR and others
- JASPAR: database of transcription factor binding sites for eukaryotes
- CIS-BP: an "online library of transcription factors and their DNA binding motifs" spanning different species (across several kingdoms), protein families, genomic assays, and studies
- PlantTFD: Plant transcription factor database
- YeTFaSCo: Yeast (S. cerevisiae) database of TF binding motifs
- TcoF-DB: Database of transcription co-factors and transcription factor interactions
- TFcheckpoint: database of human, mouse and rat TF candidates
- transcriptionfactor.org (now commercial, selling reagents)
- MethMotif.org: An integrative cell-specific database of transcription factor binding motifs coupled with DNA methylation profiles.

== See also ==
- Cdx protein family
- DNA-binding protein
- Inhibitor of DNA-binding protein
- Mapper(2)
- Nuclear receptor, a class of ligand activated transcription factors
- Open Regulatory Annotation Database
- Phylogenetic footprinting
- TRANSFAC database
- YeTFaSCo
