= KIAA2012 =

Mammalian protein found in Homo sapiens

Identifiers
- Aliases: KIAA2012
- External IDs: MGI: 2685819; GeneCards: KIAA2012

Gene location (Human)
| Chr. | Chromosome 2 (human) |
| Band | 2q33.1 | Start | 202,073,255 bp |
| Band | 2q33.1 | End | 202,205,188 bp |

Gene location (Mouse)
| Chr. | Chromosome 1 (mouse) |
| Band | 1|1 C2 | Start | 59,555,423 bp |
| Band | 1|1 C2 | End | 59,675,576 bp |
RNA expression pattern
| Bgee | Human / Mouse (ortholog); Top expressed in: right uterine tube; olfactory zone of nasal mucosa; bronchial epithelial cell; oocyte; testicle; gonad; prefrontal cortex; nucleus accumbens; Brodmann area 9; pituitary gland / Top expressed in: spermatid; testicle; spermatocyte; hypothalamus; zygote; urinary bladder; primary oocyte; secondary oocyte; lip; ovary; More reference expression data |
| BioGPS | n/a |
Orthologs
| Databases | NCBI: entry; OMA: entry |
| Species | Human | Mouse |
| Entrez | 100652824 | 381260 |
| Ensembl | ENSG00000182329 | ENSMUSG00000047361 |
| UniProt | Q0VF49 | n/a |
| RefSeq (mRNA) | NM_001080445; NM_001277372; NM_001367720 | NM_001013771; NM_001357842 |
| RefSeq (protein) | NP_001264301; NP_001354649 | n/a |
| Location (UCSC) | Chr 2: 202.07 – 202.21 Mb | Chr 1: 59.56 – 59.68 Mb |
| PubMed search |
- Wikidata
| View/Edit Human | View/Edit Mouse |

Uncharacterized protein KIAA2012 is a protein which, in humans, is encoded by the KIAA2012 gene. KIAA2012 is expressed at very low levels throughout the body, but it is primarily expressed in the ovary, lungs, and brain.

== Gene ==
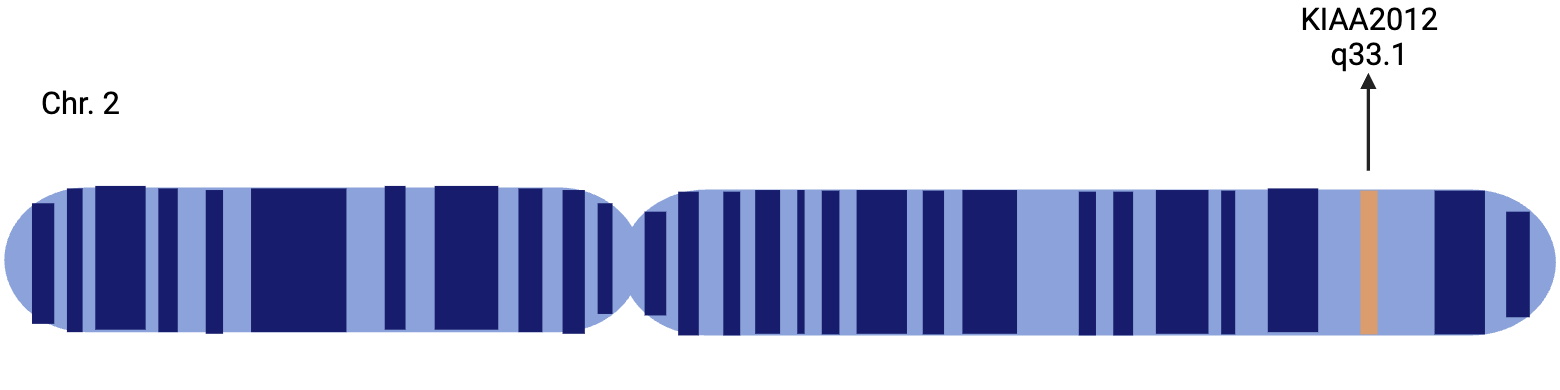
Ideogram of human chromosome 2 showing the location of KIAA2012.

KIAA2012 is located on the positive sense strand at position 2q33.1. KIAA2012 has 24 exons, and it spans 131,934 bases including introns. No aliases or common names are used in addition to KIAA2012.

=== Gene level regulation ===
Within the promoter region of KIAA2012, there is a highly conserved transcription factor binding site that has no common SNPs. The RFX transcription factors, more specifically RFX1-6, bind to this highly conserved region and regulates cellular specialization and differentiation. The image below shows the promoter region of KIAA2012 with the highly conserved RFX1-6 binding site.

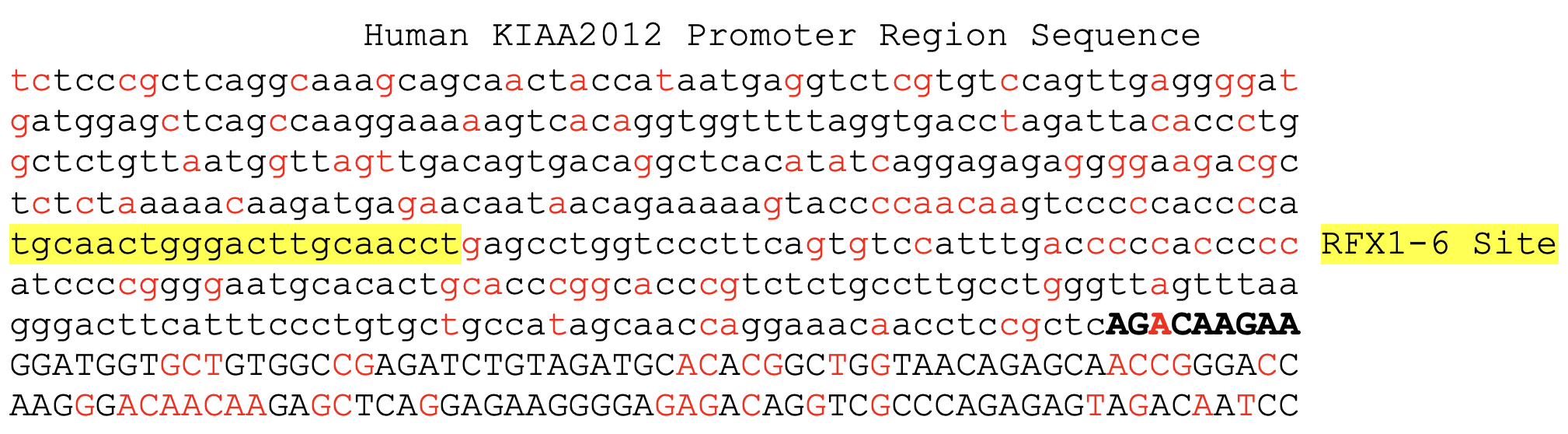
Human KIAA2012 promoter sequence. In red are common SNPs, highlighted in yellow is the conserved RFX1-6 transcription factor binding site, and the bolded letters show the transcription start site.

== mRNA ==
KIAA2012 is expressed differentially in the body at low levels. Of this overall low expression, KIAA2012 is expressed most highly in the brain, lungs, and ovary. KIAA2012 is expressed at lower levels in the liver, trachea, and testes.

== Protein ==
Unmodified KIAA2012 is 1,181 amino acids in length, has a molecular weight of 136 kdal, and an isoelectric pH around 8.

=== Internal features ===
KIAA2012 is rich in glutamic acid and glutamine, and it is poor in valine. There is also one mixed charge cluster between amino acids 951–1118. There is one Domain of Unknown Function (DUF 4670) within KIAA2012 spanning from amino acid 635 to amino acid 1137. Different than the whole KIAA2012, DUF 4670 is also rich in arginine and poor in glycine and phenylalanine.

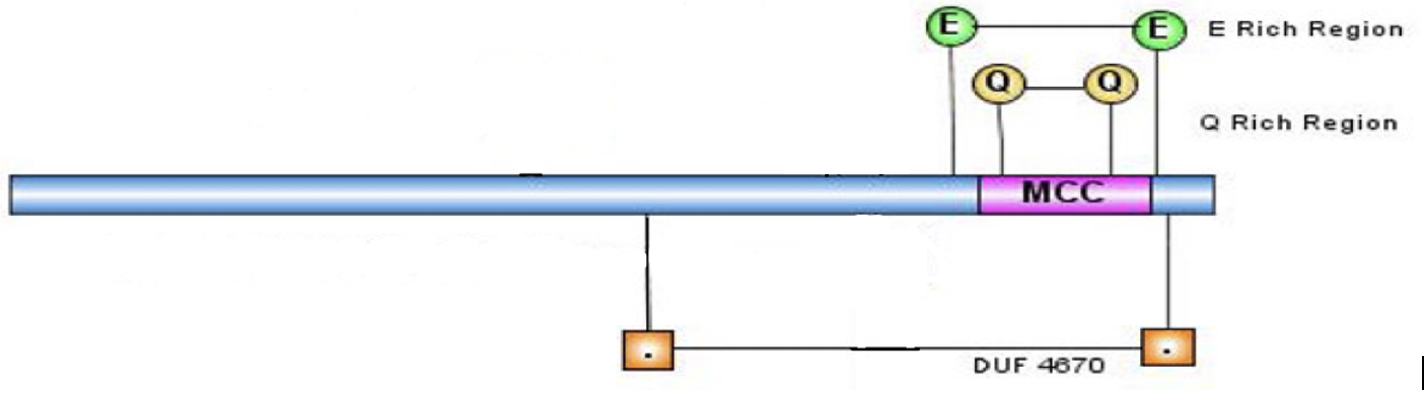
Schematic of KIAA2012 with annotations showing the Glutamine (E) and Glutamic Acid (Q) rich regions, DUF 4670, and the mixed charge cluster (MCC).

=== Structure ===
The secondary structure of KIAA2012 consists primarily of alpha helices. On the left, a high confidence prediction of the secondary structure is shown. On the right, the entire 3-D structure is shown, showing how the alpha helices fold to form the entire KIAA2012 protein.

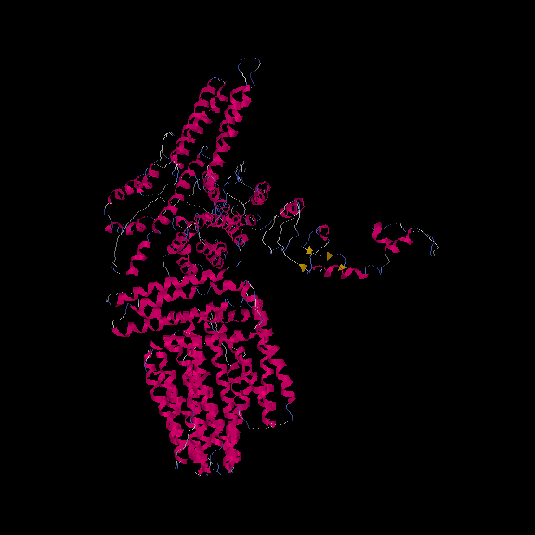
Predicted folding pattern and 3-D structure of KIAA2012.

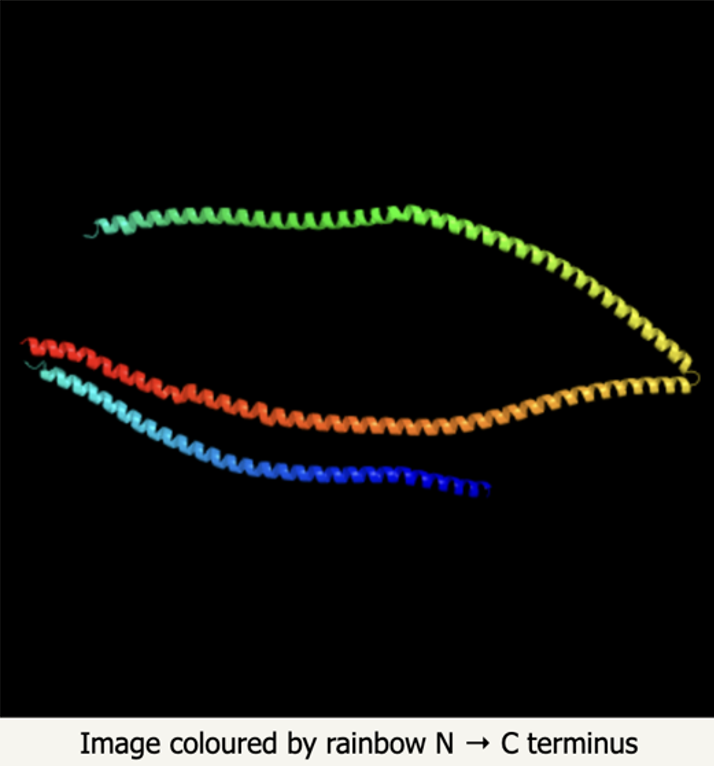
Predicted KIAA2012 secondary structure with a 91.2% confidence level.

=== Post-translational modification ===
KIAA2012 has a highly conserved cGMP-dependent protein kinase binding domain. These cGMP-dependent protein kinases (PRKG) are a part of the NO/cGMP signaling pathway, and they are important factors in many signal transduction processes. Additionally, there are many potential sites for phosphorylation, SUMOylation, and myristoylation. In instances where KIAA2012 is post-translationally modified in these ways, the resulting charge, structure, function, and sub-cellular localization can be altered.

=== Sub-cellular localization ===
Proteins tagged with localization signals will be transported to various regions of the cell. KIAA2012 contains nuclear localization signal sequences, which are short stretches of amino acids that moderate transportation of nuclear proteins to the nucleus. Shown in the table below, human KIAA2012 and two orthologs are listed with confidence values of where in the cell KIAA2012 is localized.

KIAA2012 Localization with Confidence Percentages
| | Nuclear | Plasma Membrane | Cytoskeletal | Mitochondrial | Cytoplasmic | Secretory Vesicles |
|---|---|---|---|---|---|---|
| Human | 82% | 4% | 9% | 4% | --- | --- |
| Sardinian Tree Frog | 78% | 9% | 9% | 4% | --- | --- |
| Zebrafish | 74% | 9% | 4% | --- | 9% | 4% |

== Function ==
KIAA2012 has predicted protein interactions with STAG2 and SMC1A. STAG2 encodes a subunit of cohesion complexes used to regulate sister chromatid separation during cell division. SMC1A is an important part of functional kinetochores due to its role in the multiprotein cohesion complex required for sister chromatid cohesion. Because KIAA2012 is localized in the nucleus and interacts with STAG2 and SMC1A, its role as a protein surrounds DNA manipulation or cell division.

Predicted Proteins that Interact with KIAA2012
| Protein Name | Aliases | Location |
|---|---|---|
| SMC1A | SMC1, SMCB, CDLS2, SB1.8, SMC1L1, DXS423E, SMC1alpha, RP6-29D12.1 | Xp11.22 |
| STAG2 | SA2, SA-2, SCC3B, bA517O1.1, RP11-517O1.1 | Xq25 |

== Homology and evolution ==
Twenty organisms with a KIAA2012 ortholog are shown below, and they are sorted by date of divergence and sequence identity. There were no orthologs found in birds, but ortholog versions of KIAA2012 exist in mammals, reptiles, amphibians, and fish. An unrooted phylogenetic tree showing each taxonomic group and their divergence patterns can be found below the ortholog table.

| Genus & Species | Common Name | Date of Divergenve (MYA) | Accession # | Sequence Length | % Identity | % Similarity |
| Homo sapiens | Human | 0 | NM_001277372.4 | 1181 | 100 | 100 |
| Hylobates moloch | Silvery Gibbon | 19.5 | XP_032610815 | 1181 | 94.2 | 96.4 |
| Sciurus carolinensis | Gray Squirrel | 87 | XP_047398902 | 1130 | 64.1 | 72.3 |
| Mus caroli | Mouse | 87 | XP_029333762 | 1160 | 61.3 | 72 |
| Panthera uncia | Snow Leopard | 94 | XP_049471125 | 1180 | 75.3 | 82.7 |
| Orcinus orca | Killer Whale | 94 | XP_033285753 | 1172 | 74.5 | 82.7 |
| Bubalus bubalis | Water Buffalo | 94 | XP_006080602 | 1185 | 72.9 | 81.1 |
| Alligator mississippiensis | American Alligator | 319 | XP_059583055 | 1325 | 37.1 | 49.7 |
| Caretta caretta | Loggerhead Turtle | 319 | XP_048725054 | 1329 | 37 | 51.4 |
| Chelonia mydas | Green Sea Turtle | 319 | XP_037768210 | 1325 | 36.8 | 50.9 |
| Crotalus tigris | Tiger Rattlesnake | 319 | XP_039210533 | 1220 | 32.4 | 46.9 |
| Xenopus tropicalis | Western Clawed Frog | 352 | XP_031749269 | 1339 | 31.9 | 45.8 |
| Rhinatrema bivittatum | Two-Lined Caecilian | 352 | XP_029462137 | 1499 | 30.6 | 44.8 |
| Spea bombifrons | Plains Spadefoot Toad | 352 | XP_053326593 | 1436 | 29.6 | 44 |
| Hyla sarda | Sardinian Tree Frog | 352 | XP_056391303 | 1428 | 29.5 | 44.9 |
| Protopterus annectens | West African Lungfish | 408 | XP_043931036 | 1412 | 29.8 | 45 |
| Takifugu rubripes | Japanese Puffer | 429 | XP_029701411 | 1129 | 25.3 | 39.4 |
| Danio rerio | Zebrafish | 429 | XP_009302807 | 1484 | 24.9 | 37.1 |
| Anarrhichthys ocellatus | Wolf Eel | 429 | XP_031729884 | 1204 | 23.9 | 37.3 |
| Amblyraja radiata | Thorny Skate | 462 | XP_032880336 | 1392 | 25.7 | 40.5 |

Unrooted phylogenetic tree of the KIAA2012 orthologs found in Table 1. Mammals (yellow), reptiles (red), amphibians (green), and fish (blue) are circled to differentiate between them, and images of each species are provided next to the three-letter code

== Clinical significance ==
There are several genome-wide association studies that report traits associated variations in KIAA2012. The reported traits with the highest number of associations are heel bone mineral density, taste liking measurement, educational attainment, lung function, and height. Additionally, KIAA2012 is down regulated in women with polyendocrine metabolic ovarian syndrome (PMOS) compared to women without PMOS.
