= RFX1 =

Protein-coding gene in the species Homo sapiens

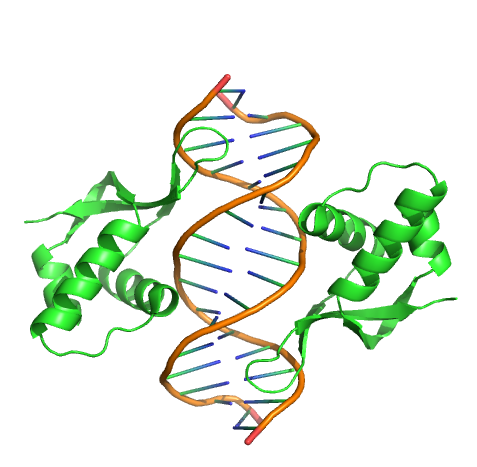

Identifiers
- Aliases: RFX1, EFC, RFX, regulatory factor X1
- External IDs: OMIM: 600006; MGI: 105982; GeneCards: RFX1
Available structures
PDB	Ortholog search: PDBe RCSB
PDB	List of PDB id codes 1DP7

Gene location (Human)
Chr.	Chromosome 19 (human)
Band	19p13.12	Start	13,961,530 bp
Band	19p13.12	End	14,007,039 bp

Gene location (Mouse)
Chr.	Chromosome 8 (mouse)
Band	8 C2|8 40.28 cM	Start	84,793,463 bp
Band	8 C2|8 40.28 cM	End	84,823,621 bp
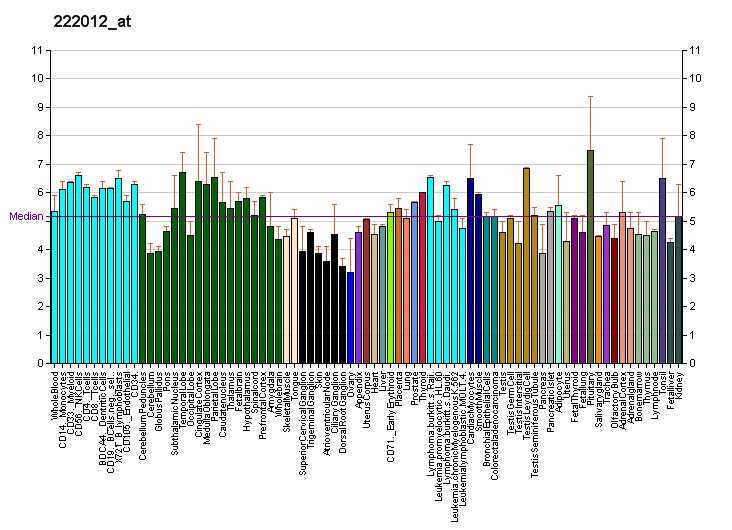

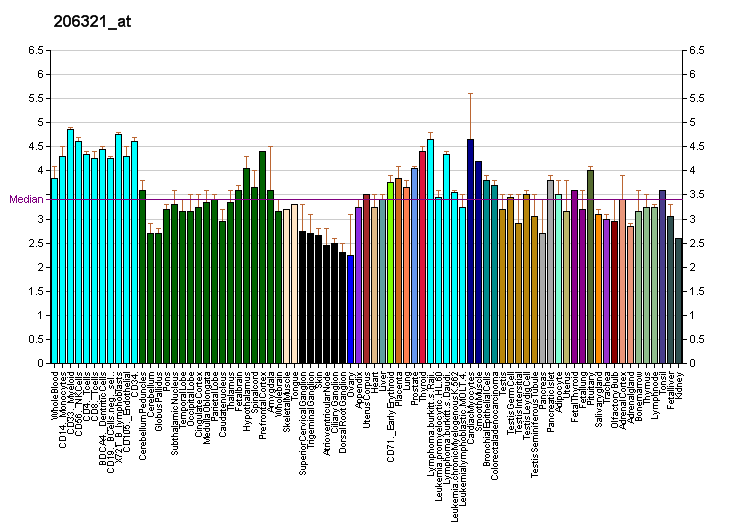
RNA expression pattern
Bgee	Human / Mouse (ortholog); Top expressed in: right testis; left testis; granulocyte; pituitary gland; right uterine tube; anterior pituitary; blood; right hemisphere of cerebellum; apex of heart; gonad / Top expressed in: ascending aorta; neural layer of retina; aortic valve; spermatid; granulocyte; seminiferous tubule; mesenteric lymph nodes; blood; superior frontal gyrus; thymus; More reference expression data
BioGPS	More reference expression data
Gene ontology
Molecular function	RNA polymerase II cis-regulatory region sequence-specific DNA binding; transcription factor activity, RNA polymerase II distal enhancer sequence-specific binding; DNA binding; protein binding; DNA-binding transcription factor activity, RNA polymerase II-specific; DNA-binding transcription factor activity
Cellular component	intracellular membrane-bounded organelle; nucleoplasm; nucleus
Biological process	regulation of transcription, DNA-templated; immune response; transcription, DNA-templated; regulation of transcription by RNA polymerase II
Sources:Amigo / QuickGO
Orthologs
Databases	NCBI: entry; OMA: entry
Species	Human	Mouse
Entrez	5989	19724
Ensembl	ENSG00000132005; ENSG00000288283	ENSMUSG00000031706
UniProt	P22670	P48377
RefSeq (mRNA)	NM_002918	NM_009055
RefSeq (protein)	NP_002909	NP_033081
Location (UCSC)	Chr 19: 13.96 – 14.01 Mb	Chr 8: 84.79 – 84.82 Mb
PubMed search
- Wikidata
View/Edit Human	View/Edit Mouse

MHC class II regulatory factor RFX1 is a protein that, in humans, is encoded by the RFX1 gene located on the short arm of chromosome 19.

== Structure ==
The RFX1 gene is a member of the regulatory factor X (RFX) gene family, which encodes transcription factors that contain five conserved domains including a highly conserved, centrally located, winged helix DNA binding domain as well as a dimerization domain located in the C-terminal region of the sequence. Apart from the five conserved domains, the RFX proteins diverge significantly. The DNA binding and dimerization domains of the RFX family proteins show no similarities to the other domains with the same functions in other proteins.

== Species distribution ==
The RFX protein family is conserved in S. pombe, S. cerevisiae, C. elegans, mice and humans. There are eight known RFX proteins in humans, two in fruit flies, one in C. elegans, nine in fish, and one in each of the two species of yeast.

== Function ==
The protein encoded by this gene is structurally related to regulatory factors X2, X3, X4, and X5. It is a transcriptional activator that can bind DNA as a monomer or as a heterodimer with RFX family members X2, X3, and X5, but not with X4. This protein binds to the Xboxes of MHC class II genes and is essential for their expression. Also, it can bind to an inverted repeat that is required for expression of hepatitis B virus genes. The RFX proteins were originally cloned and characterized due to their high affinity for a cis-acting promoter sequence, called the Xbox, found in all MHC class II genes.

Levels of mRNA encoding this protein as well as RFX2 and RFX3 are found to be consistently elevated in the testis and are variable in other tissues throughout the body.

RFX1 contains a C-terminal sequence with no apparent homology to other RFX proteins. This C-terminal tail contains an acidic region that is thought to aid in crossing the nuclear membrane. Two major functions are hypothesized to this exist for this domain: a contribution to the nuclear localization signal (NLS) as well as the contradictory down-regulation of DNA binding as well as nuclear association. These two functions were originally identified through sequence mutations and translational fusions with gfp (green fluorescent protein) and remain to be confirmed.

== Interactions ==
RFX1 has been shown to interact with Abl gene.
