= Nuclear factor 1 B-type =

Protein-coding gene in the species Homo sapiens

NFIB

Identifiers
- Aliases: NFIB, CTF, HMGIC/NF-I/B, NF1-B, NFI-B, NFI-RED, NFIB2, NFIB3, nuclear factor I B, MACID
- External IDs: OMIM: 600728; MGI: 103188; GeneCards: NFIB

Gene location (Human)
Chr.	Chromosome 9 (human)
Band	9p23-p22.3	Start	14,081,843 bp
Band	9p23-p22.3	End	14,398,983 bp

Gene location (Mouse)
Chr.	Chromosome 4 (mouse)
Band	4 C3|4 38.4 cM	Start	82,208,410 bp
Band	4 C3|4 38.4 cM	End	82,623,987 bp
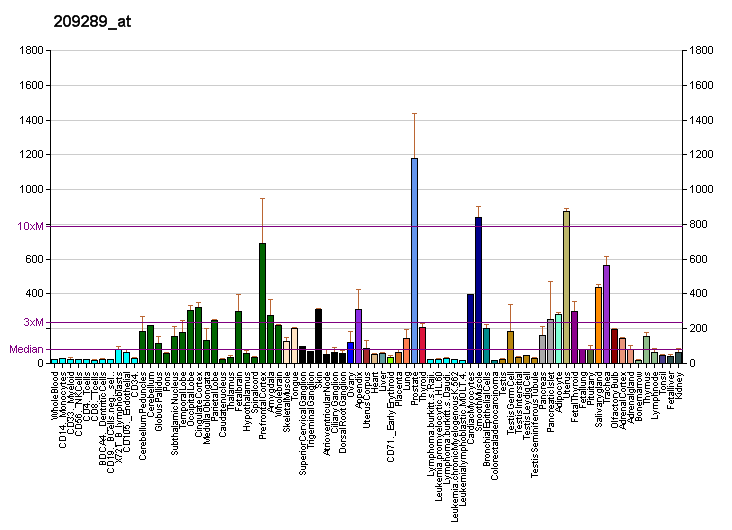

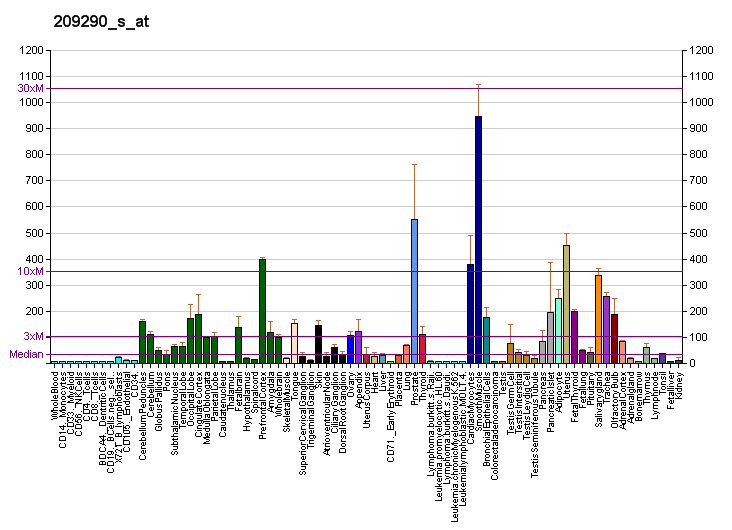

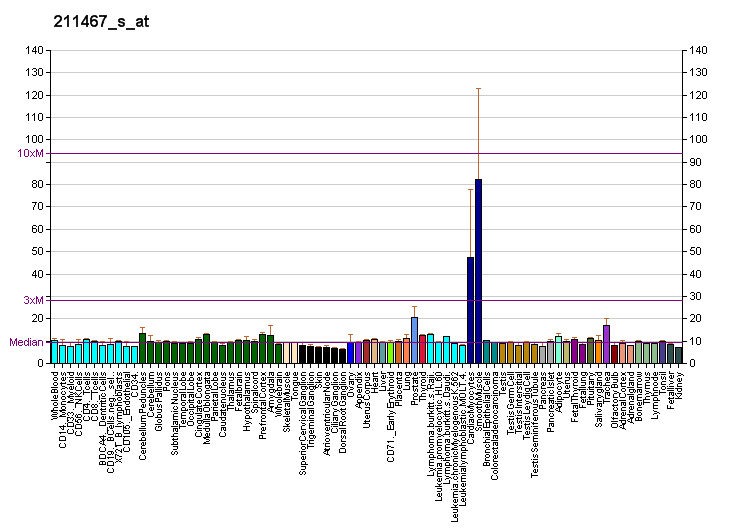
RNA expression pattern
Bgee	Human / Mouse (ortholog); Top expressed in: pericardium; epithelium of lactiferous gland; lactiferous duct; urethra; nipple; parietal pleura; mucosa of paranasal sinus; saphenous vein; vena cava; synovial joint / Top expressed in: Rostral migratory stream; human fetus; ureter; pineal gland; semi-lunar valve; internal carotid artery; lactiferous gland; condyle; parotid gland; efferent ductule; More reference expression data
BioGPS	More reference expression data
Gene ontology
Molecular function	DNA binding; transcription corepressor activity; DNA-binding transcription factor activity; DNA-binding transcription activator activity, RNA polymerase II-specific; RNA polymerase II cis-regulatory region sequence-specific DNA binding; double-stranded DNA binding; DNA-binding transcription factor activity, RNA polymerase II-specific
Cellular component	intracellular anatomical structure; cerebellar mossy fiber; nucleus; fibrillar center
Biological process	cell differentiation involved in salivary gland development; club cell differentiation; negative regulation of epithelial cell proliferation involved in lung morphogenesis; regulation of transcription, DNA-templated; negative regulation of mesenchymal cell proliferation involved in lung development; chondrocyte differentiation; lung development; negative regulation of DNA binding; salivary gland cavitation; hindbrain development; glial cell differentiation; negative regulation of transcription by RNA polymerase II; commissural neuron axon guidance; transcription, DNA-templated; anterior commissure morphogenesis; lung ciliated cell differentiation; DNA replication; type I pneumocyte differentiation; principal sensory nucleus of trigeminal nerve development; forebrain development; type II pneumocyte differentiation; positive regulation of transcription by RNA polymerase II; negative regulation of pri-miRNA transcription by RNA polymerase II; negative regulation of cell population proliferation; transcription by RNA polymerase II; response to bacterium
Sources:Amigo / QuickGO
Orthologs
Databases	NCBI: entry; OMA: entry
Species	Human	Mouse
Entrez	4781	18028
Ensembl	ENSG00000147862	ENSMUSG00000008575
UniProt	O00712	P97863
RefSeq (mRNA)	NM_001190737; NM_001190738; NM_001282787; NM_005596	NM_001113209; NM_001113210; NM_001286127; NM_001286131; NM_008687
RefSeq (protein)	NP_001177666; NP_001177667; NP_001269716; NP_005587; NP_001356387 NP_001356388; NP_001356389; NP_001356390; NP_001356391; NP_001356392; NP_001356393; NP_001356394; NP_001356395; NP_001356396; NP_001356397; NP_001356398; NP_001356399; NP_001356400; NP_001356401; NP_001356402; NP_001356403; NP_001356404; NP_001356405; NP_001356406; NP_001356407; NP_001356408; NP_001356409; NP_001356410	NP_001106680; NP_001106681; NP_001273056; NP_001273060; NP_032713
Location (UCSC)	Chr 9: 14.08 – 14.4 Mb	Chr 4: 82.21 – 82.62 Mb
PubMed search
- Wikidata
View/Edit Human	View/Edit Mouse

Nuclear factor 1 B-type is a protein that in humans is encoded by the NFIB gene.

NFIB haploinsufficiency is also associated with intellectual disability and macrocephaly, as are NFIA and NFIX.

== Embryonic development ==
The NFIB gene is a part of the NFI gene complex that includes three other genes (NFIA, NFIC and NFIX). The NFIB gene is a protein coding gene that also serves as a transcription factor. This gene is essential in embryonic development and it works together with its gene complex to initiate tissue differentiation in the fetus. NFIB has the highest concentrations in the lung, skeletal muscle and heart but is also found in the areas of the developing liver, kidneys and brain.

Through knockout experiments, researchers found that mice without the NFIB gene have severely underdeveloped lungs. This mutation does not seem to cause spontaneous abortions because in utero the fetus does not use its lungs for respiration. However, this becomes lethal once the fetus is born and has to take its first breath. It is thought that NFIB plays a role in down regulating the transcription factors TGF-β1 and Shh in normal gestation because they remained high in knockout experiments. The absence of NFIB also leads to insufficient amounts of surfactant being produced which is one reason why the mice cannot breathe once it is born. The knockout experiments demonstrated that NFIB has a significant role in fore-brain development. NFIB is typically found in pontine nuclei of the CNS, the cerebral cortex and the white matter of the brain and without NFIB these areas are dramatically affected.

Absence of one copy is associated with macrocephaly and intellectual disability. This associated was confirmed in mouse models where deletion of one copy resulted in enlargement of the brain while preserving its overall organisation.
