= NF1 =

NF1 may refer to:

- Neurofibromatosis type I, a genetic disorder that can cause tumors (can be cancerous) and other health effects such as vision impairment, imbowed legs, and joint pain.
- Neurofibromin 1, a protein associated with the disorder above.
- Nuclear factor 1, a transcription factor.
- NF-1, a variant of the AA-52 machine gun rechambered for 7.62 NATO ammunition.
- NF1 (a.k.a. NGSFF/M.3), a specification for internally mounted expansion cards
