= NFIB =

NFIB may refer to:

- National Federation of Independent Business, US
  - National Federation of Independent Business v. Sebelius, a US Supreme Court case against Affordable Care Act
- National Foreign Intelligence Board, later National Intelligence Board, of US intelligence leaders
- National Fraud Intelligence Bureau, on UK fraud and cybercrime
- Nuclear factor 1 B-type, encoded by the NFIB gene
