= Gp-39 (disambiguation) =

- Cartilage glycoprotein 39 also called gp-39 or YKL-40
- CD40-ligand (TNF ligand superfamily member 5), also called CD40L and gp-39
- EMD GP39 locomotive unit also called GP39
