= Intermediate progenitor cell =

Intermediate progenitor cells (IPCs) are a type of progenitor cell in the developing cerebral cortex. They are multipolar cells produced by radial glial cells who have undergone asymmetric division. IPCs can produce neuron cells via neurogenesis and are responsible for ensuring the proper quantity of cortical neurons are produced. In mammals, neural stem cells are the primary progenitors during embryogenesis whereas intermediate progenitor cells are the secondary progenitors.

== Function ==
Neurogenesis is a vital part of embryonic development. IPCs divide symmetrically, primarily in the subventricular zone (SVZ) of the neuroepithelium to produce either a new pair of IPC's or a pair of neurons. Fully developed neurons are most likely targeted to the upper cortical layers. Recent studies have shown that IPC's are activated by similar factors in both adult and embryonic development, challenging the early notion that they were only needed in embryogenesis.

Neurogenesis is also a two-tiered pattern. When radial glial cells divide, they produce one replacement radial glial cell and one IPC. That IPC can then divide to form two like neurons. This method is important because it allows more neurons to be produced while still conserving glia to regenerate the cycle. The asymmetric division of radial glial cells and the subsequent symmetric division of intermediate progenitor cells may be the mechanism that resulted in the expansion of the cerebral cortex during evolution. The interactions between symmetric and asymmetric division work to enhance the productiveness during the development period and allow the cortex to grow.

Some intermediate progenitor cells migrate via the rostral migratory stream to the olfactory bulb and differentiate further.

Overall, IPCs are crucial to both adult and embryonic neural development, but the research explaining the mechanisms for their symmetric division is still limited.

== Regulation of IPCs ==
During development, intermediate progenitor cells are spatially associated with blood vessels. Once the vessels have passed into the brain's cortex, IPCs mimic their capillary patterns. After alignment, IPC divisions are localized to the vessel branches, suggesting that the vascular system is needed to produce the proper stem-cell niche for differentiation.

Tbr2 was also found to be organized along blood vessels. It is assumed that Tbr2 are needed to ensure the proper patterns of IPC division through its action in a signaling cascade .

Nfix is thought to be a necessary transcription factor facilitating proper symmetric and asymmetric division. It was identified following neurogenesis inadequacies observed when cells presented Nfix deficiencies.

Tis21 was found to regulate the frequency of symmetric divisions is response to Tis21 levels, suggesting it plays some role in the mechanism for division.

== See also ==
- Progenitor cell
- Neurogenesis
- Radial glial cell
