= Structure specific recognition protein 1 =

Protein-coding gene in the species Homo sapiens

SSRP1

Identifiers
- Aliases: SSRP1, FACT, FACT80, T160, Structure specific recognition protein 1
- External IDs: OMIM: 604328; MGI: 107912; GeneCards: SSRP1
Available structures
PDB	Ortholog search: PDBe RCSB
PDB	List of PDB id codes 4IFS

Gene location (Human)
Chr.	Chromosome 11 (human)
Band	11q12.1	Start	57,325,986 bp
Band	11q12.1	End	57,335,892 bp

Gene location (Mouse)
Chr.	Chromosome 2 (mouse)
Band	2 D|2 49.45 cM	Start	84,867,578 bp
Band	2 D|2 49.45 cM	End	84,877,453 bp
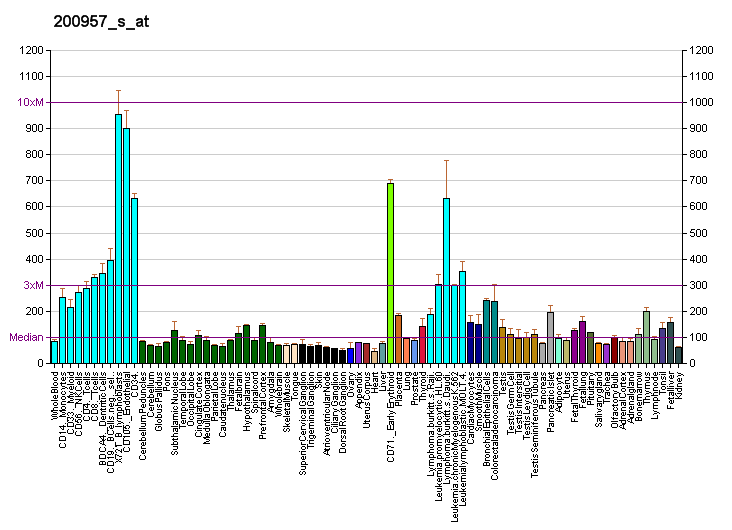

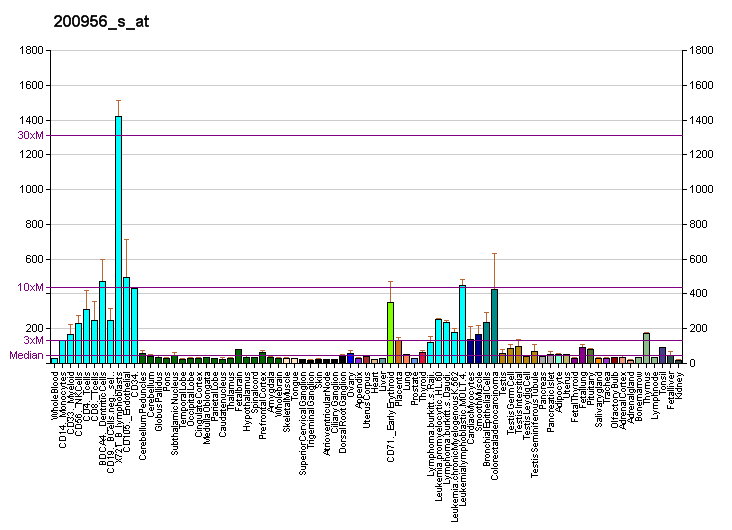
RNA expression pattern
Bgee	Human / Mouse (ortholog); Top expressed in: ventricular zone; ganglionic eminence; tendon of biceps brachii; gastrocnemius muscle; Achilles tendon; islet of Langerhans; body of pancreas; left ovary; body of uterus; mucosa of transverse colon / Top expressed in: otic placode; saccule; otic vesicle; tail of embryo; mandibular prominence; abdominal wall; genital tubercle; maxillary prominence; primitive streak; somite; More reference expression data
BioGPS	More reference expression data
Gene ontology
Molecular function	DNA binding; chromatin binding; protein binding; RNA binding; DNA-binding transcription factor activity, RNA polymerase II-specific; nucleosome binding; histone binding
Cellular component	nucleolus; nucleoplasm; chromosome; nucleus; FACT complex
Biological process	DNA replication; transcription elongation from RNA polymerase II promoter; regulation of transcription, DNA-templated; transcription by RNA polymerase II; DNA repair; transcription, DNA-templated; cellular response to DNA damage stimulus; regulation of signal transduction by p53 class mediator; regulation of transcription by RNA polymerase II
Sources:Amigo / QuickGO
Orthologs
Databases	NCBI: entry; OMA: entry
Species	Human	Mouse
Entrez	6749	20833
Ensembl	ENSG00000149136	ENSMUSG00000027067
UniProt	Q08945	Q08943
RefSeq (mRNA)	NM_003146	NM_001136081; NM_182990
RefSeq (protein)	NP_003137	NP_001129553; NP_892035
Location (UCSC)	Chr 11: 57.33 – 57.34 Mb	Chr 2: 84.87 – 84.88 Mb
PubMed search
- Wikidata
View/Edit Human	View/Edit Mouse

FACT complex subunit SSRP1 also known as structure specific recognition protein 1 is a protein that in humans is encoded by the SSRP1 gene.

== Function ==
The protein encoded by this gene is a subunit of a heterodimer that, along with SUPT16H, forms chromatin transcriptional elongation factor FACT. FACT interacts specifically with histones H2A/H2B to effect nucleosome disassembly and transcription elongation. FACT and cisplatin-damaged DNA may be crucial to the anticancer mechanism of cisplatin. This encoded protein contains a high mobility group box which most likely constitutes the structure recognition element for cisplatin-modified DNA. This protein also functions as a co-activator of the transcriptional activator p63.

== Interactions ==
Structure specific recognition protein 1 has been shown to interact with NEK9. SSRP1 further interacts with transcriptional activator p63. SSRP1 enhances the activity of full-length p63, but it has no effect on the N-terminus-deleted p63 (DeltaN-p63) variant.
