= NEK9 =

Protein-coding gene in humans

Identifiers
- Aliases: NEK9, NERCC, NERCC1, Nek8, NIMA related kinase 9, APUG, LCCS10, NC
- External IDs: OMIM: 609798; MGI: 2387995; GeneCards: NEK9
Available structures
PDB	Ortholog search: PDBe RCSB
PDB	List of PDB id codes 3ZKE, 3ZKF
Enzyme activity
EC #	BRENDA	ExPASy	KEGG	MetaCyc
2.7.11.38	↗	↗	↗	↗

Gene location (Human)
Chr.	Chromosome 14 (human)
Band	14q24.3	Start	75,079,353 bp
Band	14q24.3	End	75,127,344 bp

Gene location (Mouse)
Chr.	Chromosome 12 (mouse)
Band	12|12 D2	Start	85,346,288 bp
Band	12|12 D2	End	85,386,136 bp
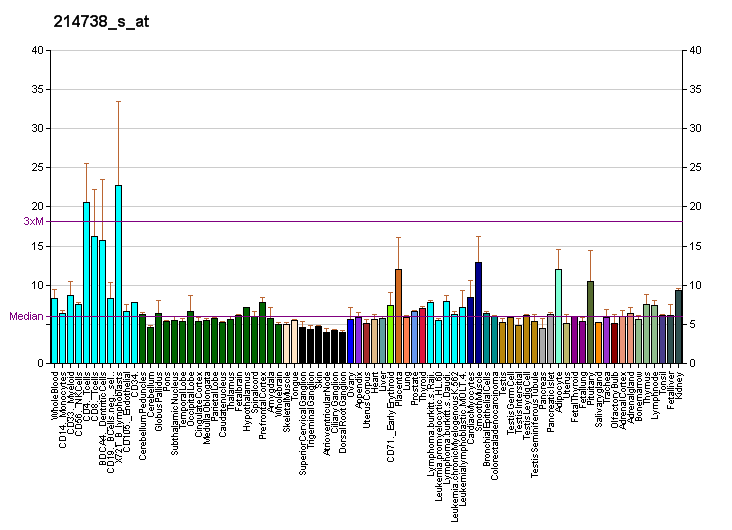

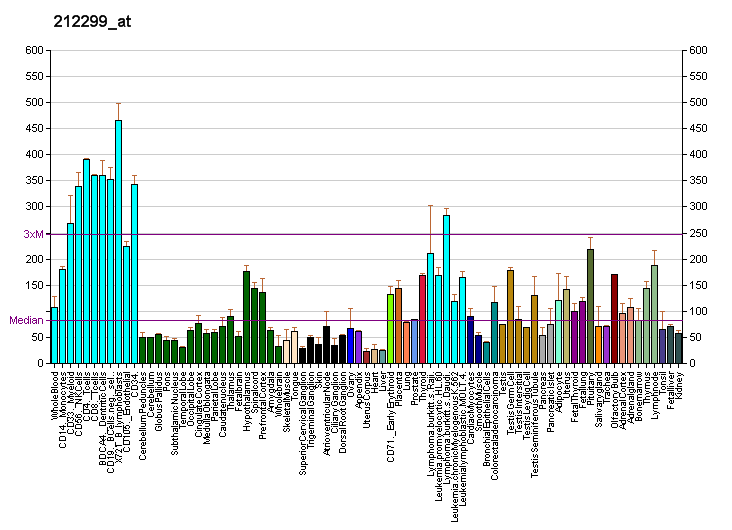
RNA expression pattern
Bgee	Human / Mouse (ortholog); Top expressed in: tibia; right uterine tube; left ovary; tendon of biceps brachii; right ovary; body of uterus; canal of the cervix; gastrocnemius muscle; muscle layer of sigmoid colon; stromal cell of endometrium / Top expressed in: epithelium of lens; vastus lateralis muscle; iris; triceps brachii muscle; sternocleidomastoid muscle; utricle; temporal muscle; ureter; medial head of gastrocnemius muscle; endocardial cushion; More reference expression data
BioGPS	More reference expression data
Gene ontology
Molecular function	transferase activity; nucleotide binding; protein kinase activity; metal ion binding; kinase activity; protein binding; ATP binding; protein kinase binding; protein serine/threonine kinase activity
Cellular component	cytosol; nucleus; cytoplasm; centrosome
Biological process	phosphorylation; cell division; mitotic nuclear membrane disassembly; cell cycle; protein phosphorylation
Sources:Amigo / QuickGO
Orthologs
Databases	NCBI: entry; OMA: entry
Species	Human	Mouse
Entrez	91754	217718
Ensembl	ENSG00000119638	ENSMUSG00000034290
UniProt	Q8TD19	Q8K1R7
RefSeq (mRNA)	NM_033116; NM_001329237; NM_001329238	NM_145138
RefSeq (protein)	NP_001316166; NP_001316167; NP_149107	NP_660120
Location (UCSC)	Chr 14: 75.08 – 75.13 Mb	Chr 12: 85.35 – 85.39 Mb
PubMed search
- Wikidata
View/Edit Human	View/Edit Mouse

Serine/threonine-protein kinase Nek9 is an enzyme that in humans is encoded by the NEK9 gene.

== Interactions ==
NEK9 has been shown to interact with:

- NEK6,
- RAN, and
- SSRP1.
