= NEK6 =

Protein-coding gene in the species Homo sapiens

Identifiers
- Aliases: NEK6, SID6-1512, NIMA related kinase 6
- External IDs: OMIM: 604884; MGI: 1891638; GeneCards: NEK6
Enzyme activity
| EC # | BRENDA | ExPASy | KEGG | MetaCyc |
|---|---|---|---|---|
| 2.7.11.34 | ↗ | ↗ | ↗ | ↗ |

Gene location (Human)
| Chr. | Chromosome 9 (human) |
| Band | 9q33.3 | Start | 124,257,606 bp |
| Band | 9q33.3 | End | 124,353,307 bp |

Gene location (Mouse)
| Chr. | Chromosome 2 (mouse) |
| Band | 2 B|2 24.41 cM | Start | 38,401,655 bp |
| Band | 2 B|2 24.41 cM | End | 38,484,618 bp |
RNA expression pattern
| Bgee | Human / Mouse (ortholog); Top expressed in: sural nerve; stromal cell of endometrium; ventricular zone; right lobe of liver; appendix; mucosa of ileum; cartilage tissue; gallbladder; pancreatic ductal cell; monocyte / Top expressed in: ventricular zone; epithelium of small intestine; jejunum; endothelial cell of lymphatic vessel; stroma of bone marrow; granulocyte; neural tube; placenta; dentate gyrus of hippocampal formation granule cell; yolk sac; More reference expression data |
| BioGPS | n/a |
Gene ontology
| Molecular function | transferase activity; nucleotide binding; protein kinase activity; signal transducer activity; metal ion binding; kinase activity; protein binding; kinesin binding; ATP binding; protein kinase binding; magnesium ion binding; protein serine/threonine kinase activity; transcription corepressor binding; ubiquitin protein ligase binding |
| Cellular component | cytoplasm; nuclear speck; spindle pole; intracellular membrane-bounded organelle; nucleoplasm; microtubule organizing center; microtubule; cytoskeleton; nucleus; cytosol; centrosome |
| Biological process | phosphorylation; chromosome segregation; spindle assembly; cell division; protein phosphorylation; mitotic nuclear membrane disassembly; peptidyl-serine phosphorylation; regulation of mitotic cell cycle; regulation of mitotic metaphase/anaphase transition; positive regulation of I-kappaB kinase/NF-kappaB signaling; protein autophosphorylation; regulation of cellular senescence; cell cycle; apoptotic process; signal transduction |
Sources:Amigo / QuickGO
Orthologs
| Databases | NCBI: entry; OMA: entry |
| Species | Human | Mouse |
| Entrez | 10783 | 59126 |
| Ensembl | ENSG00000119408 | ENSMUSG00000026749 |
| UniProt | Q9HC98; Q5TBG4 | Q9ES70 |
| RefSeq (mRNA) | NM_001145001; NM_001166167; NM_001166168; NM_001166169; NM_001166170 NM_001166171; NM_014397 | NM_001159631; NM_021606 |
| RefSeq (protein) | NP_001138473; NP_001159639; NP_001159640; NP_001159641; NP_001159642 NP_001159643; NP_055212 | NP_001153103; NP_067619 |
| Location (UCSC) | Chr 9: 124.26 – 124.35 Mb | Chr 2: 38.4 – 38.48 Mb |
| PubMed search |
- Wikidata
| View/Edit Human | View/Edit Mouse |

Serine/threonine-protein kinase Nek6 is an enzyme that in humans is encoded by the NEK6 gene.

== Function ==
The Aspergillus nidulans 'never in mitosis A' (NIMA) gene encodes a serine/threonine kinase that controls initiation of mitosis. NIMA-related kinases (NEKs) are a group of protein kinases that are homologous to NIMA. Evidence suggests that NEKs perform functions similar to those of NIMA.

It is a protein kinase which plays an important role in mitotic cell cycle progression. Required for chromosome segregation at metaphase-anaphase transition, robust mitotic spindle formation and cytokinesis. Phosphorylates ATF4, CIR1, PTN, RAD26L, RBBP6, RPS7, RPS6KB1, TRIP4, STAT3 and histones H1 and H3. Phosphorylates KIF11 to promote mitotic spindle formation. Involved in G2/M phase cell cycle arrest induced by DNA damage. Inhibition of activity results in apoptosis. May contribute to tumorigenesis by suppressing p53/TP53-induced cancer cell senescence.

== Interactions ==
NEK6 has been shown to interact with NEK9.
