= CHI3L1 =

Protein found in humans

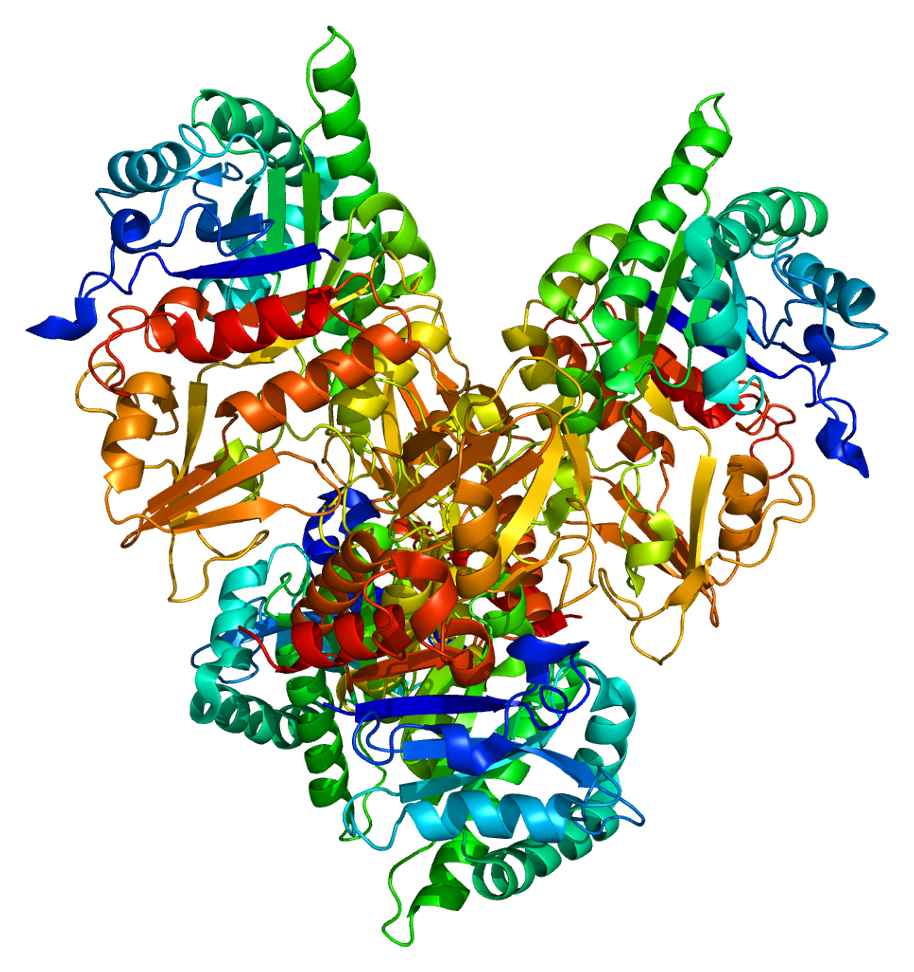

Identifiers
- Aliases: CHI3L1, chitinase 3-like 1 (cartilage glycoprotein-39), ASRT7, CGP-39, GP-39, GP39, HC-gp39, HCGP-3P, YKL-40, YKL40, YYL-40, hCGP-39, chitinase 3 like 1, YK-40
- External IDs: OMIM: 601525; MGI: 1340899; GeneCards: CHI3L1
Available structures
PDB	Ortholog search: PDBe RCSB
PDB	List of PDB id codes 1HJV, 1HJW, 1HJX, 1NWR, 1NWS, 1NWT, 1NWU

Gene location (Human)
Chr.	Chromosome 1 (human)
Band	1q32.1	Start	203,178,931 bp
Band	1q32.1	End	203,186,704 bp

Gene location (Mouse)
Chr.	Chromosome 1 (mouse)
Band	1 E4|1 58.15 cM	Start	134,182,176 bp
Band	1 E4|1 58.15 cM	End	134,190,181 bp
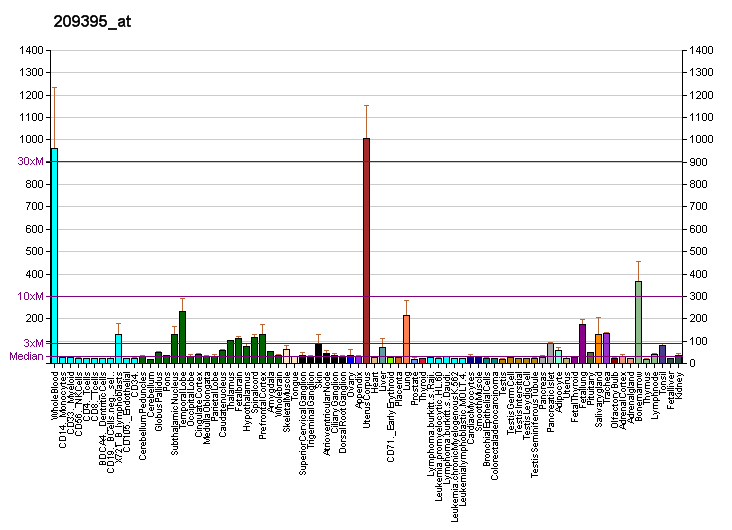

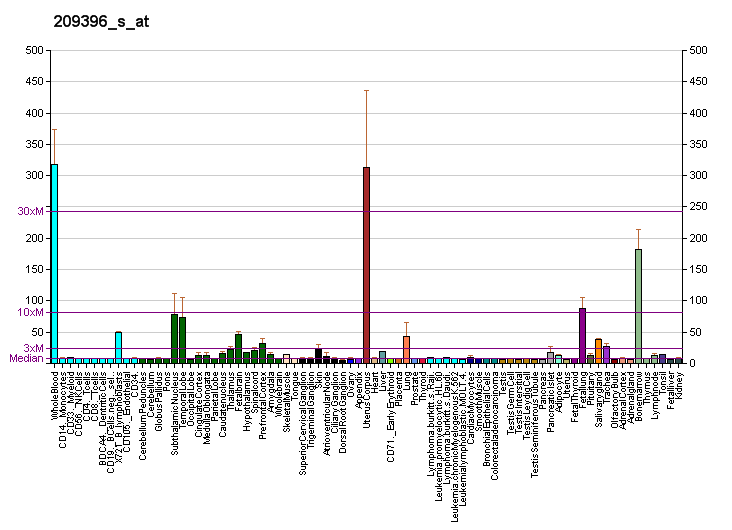

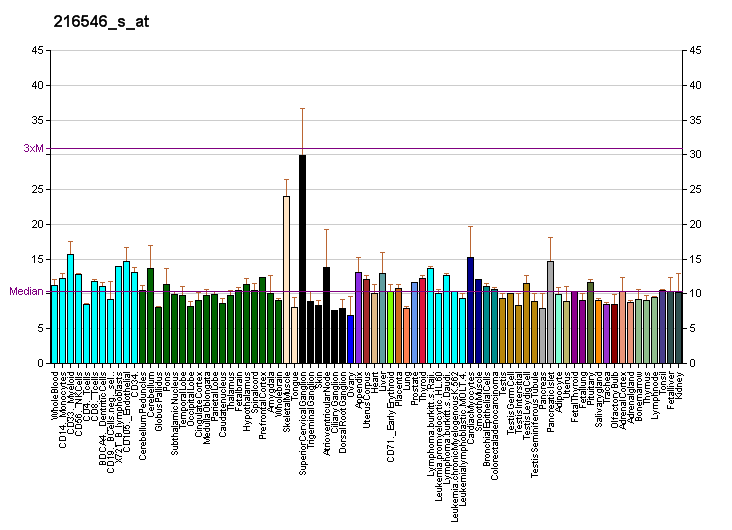
RNA expression pattern
Bgee	Human / Mouse (ortholog); Top expressed in: pericardium; cartilage tissue; skin of thigh; vulva; glomerulus; inferior olivary nucleus; metanephric glomerulus; external globus pallidus; internal globus pallidus; bone marrow / Top expressed in: granulocyte; right lung lobe; retinal pigment epithelium; tibiofemoral joint; left lung; ciliary body; lactiferous gland; lumbar subsegment of spinal cord; left lung lobe; blood; More reference expression data
BioGPS	More reference expression data
Gene ontology
Molecular function	chitinase activity; extracellular matrix structural constituent; chitin binding; carbohydrate binding; protein binding
Cellular component	endoplasmic reticulum; perinuclear region of cytoplasm; extracellular exosome; extracellular region; extracellular space; specific granule lumen; cytoplasm; extracellular matrix
Biological process	positive regulation of protein kinase B signaling; response to interleukin-1; response to interleukin-6; lung development; cellular response to tumor necrosis factor; response to mechanical stimulus; activation of NF-kappaB-inducing kinase activity; positive regulation of angiogenesis; response to tumor necrosis factor; cartilage development; positive regulation of peptidyl-threonine phosphorylation; cellular response to interleukin-1; positive regulation of ERK1 and ERK2 cascade; inflammatory response; apoptotic process; neutrophil degranulation; chitin catabolic process; carbohydrate metabolic process
Sources:Amigo / QuickGO
Orthologs
Databases	NCBI: entry; OMA: entry
Species	Human	Mouse
Entrez	1116	12654
Ensembl	ENSG00000133048	ENSMUSG00000064246
UniProt	P36222	Q61362
RefSeq (mRNA)	NM_001276	NM_007695; NM_001374626
RefSeq (protein)	NP_001267; NP_001267.2	NP_031721; NP_001361555
Location (UCSC)	Chr 1: 203.18 – 203.19 Mb	Chr 1: 134.18 – 134.19 Mb
PubMed search
- Wikidata
View/Edit Human	View/Edit Mouse

Chitinase-3-like protein 1 (CHI3L1), also known as YKL-40, is a secreted glycoprotein that is approximately 40kDa in size that in humans is encoded by the CHI3L1 gene. The name YKL-40 is derived from the three N-terminal amino acids present on the secreted form and its molecular mass. YKL-40 is expressed and secreted by various cell-types including macrophages, chondrocytes, fibroblast-like synovial cells, vascular smooth muscle cells, and hepatic stellate cells. The biological function of YKL-40 is unclear. It is not known to have a specific receptor. Its pattern of expression is associated with pathogenic processes related to inflammation, extracellular tissue remodeling, fibrosis and solid carcinomas and asthma.

== Function ==
Chitinases catalyze the hydrolysis of chitin, which is an abundant glycopolymer found in insect exoskeletons and fungal cell walls. The glycoside hydrolase 18 family of chitinases includes eight human family members. This gene encodes a glycoprotein member of the glycosyl hydrolase 18 family. The protein lacks chitinase activity and is secreted by activated macrophages, chondrocytes, neutrophils and synovial cells. The protein is thought to play a role in the process of inflammation and tissue remodeling. YKL-40 lacks chitinase activity due to mutations within the active site (conserved sequence: DXXDXDXE; YKL-40 sequence: DGLDLAWL).

== Regulation and mechanism ==
YKL-40 has been linked to activation of the AKT pro-survival (anti-apoptotic) signaling pathway. YKL-40 promotes angiogenesis through VEGF-dependent and independent pathways.

YKL-40 is a migration factor for primary astrocytes and its expression is controlled by NFI-X3, STAT3, and AP-1.

CHI3l1 is induced by a variety of cancers and in the presence of semaphorin 7A (protein) can inhibit multiple anti-tumor immune system responses. Activating an antiviral immune pathway known as the RIG-like helicase (RLH) has the ability to counter CHI3l1 induction. Cancer cells can offset RLH by stimulating NLRX1. Poly(I:C), an RNA-like molecule, can stimulate RLH activation. RLH activation can also inhibit the expression of receptor IL-13Rα2 and pulmonary metastasis. It stores NK cell accumulation and activation. It augments the expression of IFN-α/β, chemerin and its receptor ChemR23, p-cofilin, LIMK2 and PTEN and inhibiting BRAF and NLRX1 in a MAVS-dependent manner.

== Cancer ==
It is assumed that YKL-40 plays a role in cancer cell proliferation, survival, invasiveness and in the regulation of cell-matrix interactions. It is suggested that YKL-40 is a marker associated with a poorer clinical outcome in genetically defined subgroups of different tumors. YKL-40 was recently introduced into (restricted) clinical practice. A few techniques are available for its detection.

YKL-40 is a Th2 promoting cytokine that is present at high levels in the tumor microenvironment and in the serum of cancer patients. Elevated levels of YKL-40 correlate strongly with stage and outcome of various types of cancer, which establish YKL-40 as a biomarker of disease severity. Targeting YKL-40 with neutralizing antibodies is effective as a treatment in animal models of glioblastoma multiforme.

YKL-40 also enhances tumor survival in response to gamma-irradiation.

== Alzheimer's disease and neurodegeneration ==
As Alzheimer's disease progresses, soluble amyloid beta aggregates in the brain can induce the activation of microglia, which triggers synthesis of pro-inflammatory mediators. This leads to increased Chi3l1 expression in astrocytes. There is evidence that YKL-40 levels are elevated in Alzheimer's patients compared to cognitively normal individuals. Elevated levels of YKL-40 mRNA were found in Alzheimer's-inflicted brains in comparison with normal controls. Additionally, YKL-40 is correlated other dementia biomarkers, such as tau proteins and amyloid beta. YKL-40 is being examined as a novel Alzheimer's biomarker quantified in the cerebrospinal fluid or blood.

In Huntington's disease YKL-40 has an increasing trend in cerebrospinal fluid in the later disease stages and correlates highly with symptom severity.
