= FACT (biology) =

Protein complex facilitating transcription

FACT (facilitates chromatin transcription, sometimes facilitates chromatin transactions) is a heterodimeric protein complex that affects eukaryotic RNA polymerase II (Pol II) transcription elongation both in vitro and in vivo. It was discovered in 1998 as a factor purified from human cells that was essential for productive, in vitro Pol II transcription on a chromatinized DNA template.

FACT consists of 140 and 80 kilodalton (kDa) subunits. The 140 kDa subunit is encoded by the human gene SUPT16H, (SPT16 in S. cerevisiae) while the 80 kDa subunit is encoded by the human gene SSRP1 (POB3 in S. cerevisiae). Both of these subunits in yeast affect Pol II transcription elongation, and purified human FACT binds specifically to mononucleosomes and the histone H2A/H2B dimer, but not to the H3/H4 tetramer (see: Nucleosome core particle) or Pol II.

Co-immunoprecipitation assays with tagged recombinant proteins showed that the Spt16 subunit interacts with H2A/H2B dimers and mononucleosomes, but not H3/H4 tetramers, whereas the SSRP1 subunit interacts only with H3/H4 tetramers and not mononucleosomes. Deletion of the highly acidic C-terminus of Spt16 (a common feature of known histone chaperones) does not prevent Spt16 from forming a stable complex with SSRP1, but it does eliminate interaction with mononucleosomes and ability to stimulate in vitro transcription on chromatinized templates. The two subunits together, but neither alone, can stimulate formation of nucleosomes from free histones and DNA (histone chaperone activity). These two subunits are highly conserved across all eukaryotes, and in addition to transcription, have been shown to affect DNA repair and replication as well.

In cells, FACT is enriched on parts of the genome involved in actively elongating Pol II, as seen in fluorescent-antibody staining of Drosophila polytene chromosomes and chromatin immunoprecipitation (ChIP) assays on Drosophila Kc cell extracts.
