= Winged-helix transcription factors =

Family of proteins

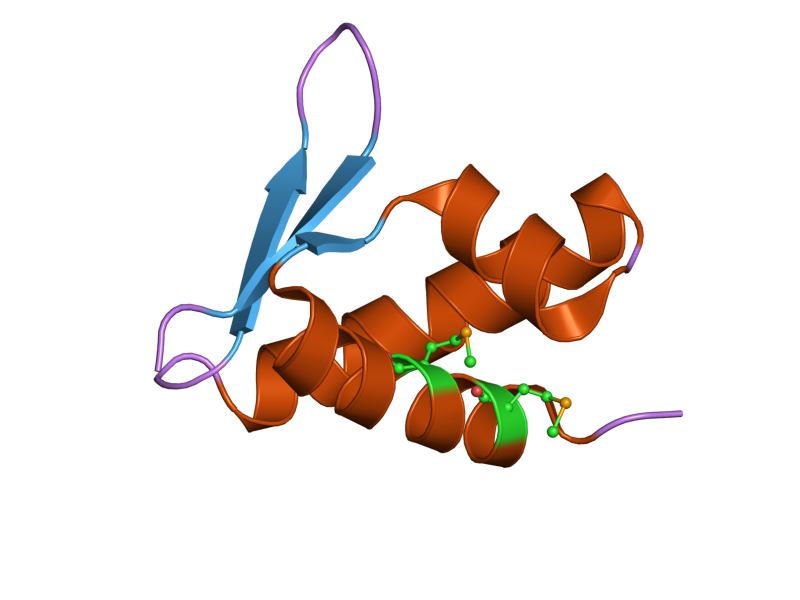
NMR solution structure of winged-helix protein, F-112, from Sulfolobus Spindle-shaped Virus 1

A winged-helix transcription factor is a type of transcription factor that binds to DNA using a protein domain called a winged-helix domain. In some cases, the term has been used to refer specifically to the family of FOX proteins, where the winged-helix domain is used synonymously with fork head domain. However, there are other families such as the RFX1-like transcription factors which have a similarly structured DNA-binding domain, despite having a very different mechanism of DNA-binding. These related transcription factors are also sometimes referred to as being winged-helix transcription factors.

== Winged-helix and Related Families ==
The FOX proteins and 2 other families (E2F and RFX) are sometimes grouped into a common “Forked head / winged helix factor” class of transcription factors.

=== Forkhead box proteins ===
Consisting of about 110 amino acids, the domain in FOX proteins (see Regulation of gene expression) has four helices and two large loops which are the “wings”. There are 50 human proteins in this family, and they are classified into 19 families called FoxA-FoxS.

=== E2F transcription factors ===
The E2F family of transcription factors possesses a DNA-binding domain that is similar to a winged-helix.

=== RFX proteins ===
RFX (Regulatory Factor X) proteins is a small family of transcription factors with diverse roles. The 8 human proteins are called RFX1-8, and have a shared characteristic of binding to a particular sequence motif called the X-box. With the exception of RFX8, they each possess a similar conserved DNA-binding domain structured like a winged helix.

== See also ==
- FOX proteins
