= YeTFaSCo =

Database of transcription factors

Content
- Description: yeast transcription factor sequence specificities.

Contact
- Research center: University of Toronto
- Laboratory: Department of Molecular Genetics and Banting
- Authors: Carl G de Boer
- Primary citation: de Boer & al. (2012)
- Release date: 2011

Access
- Website: http://yetfasco.ccbr.utoronto.ca/

YeTFaSCo (The Yeast Transcription Factor Specificity Compendium) is a database of transcription factors for Saccharomyces cerevisiae.

== See also ==
- Transcription factor
