= LIMK2 =

Protein-coding gene in the species Homo sapiens

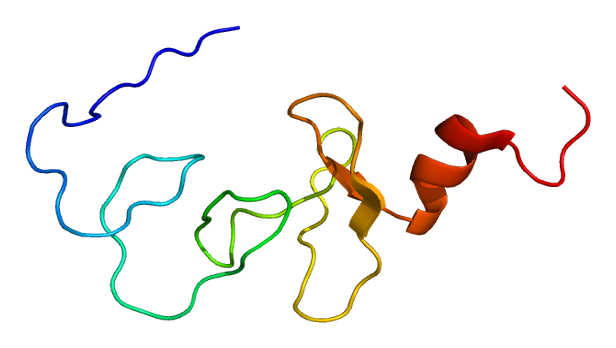

Identifiers
- Aliases: LIMK2, LIM domain kinase 2
- External IDs: OMIM: 601988; MGI: 1197517; GeneCards: LIMK2
Available structures
PDB	Ortholog search: PDBe RCSB
PDB	List of PDB id codes 1X6A, 4TPT
Enzyme activity
EC #	BRENDA	ExPASy	KEGG	MetaCyc
2.7.11.1	↗	↗	↗	↗

Gene location (Human)
Chr.	Chromosome 22 (human)
Band	22q12.2	Start	31,212,239 bp
Band	22q12.2	End	31,280,080 bp

Gene location (Mouse)
Chr.	Chromosome 11 (mouse)
Band	11|11 A1	Start	3,294,256 bp
Band	11|11 A1	End	3,359,189 bp
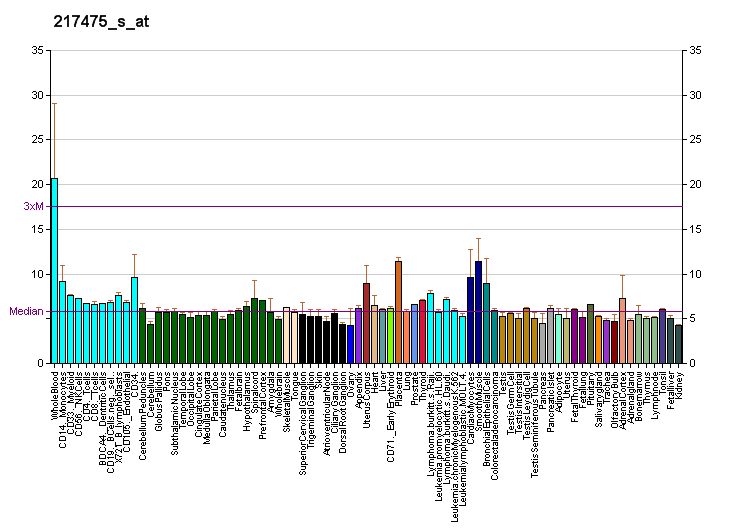

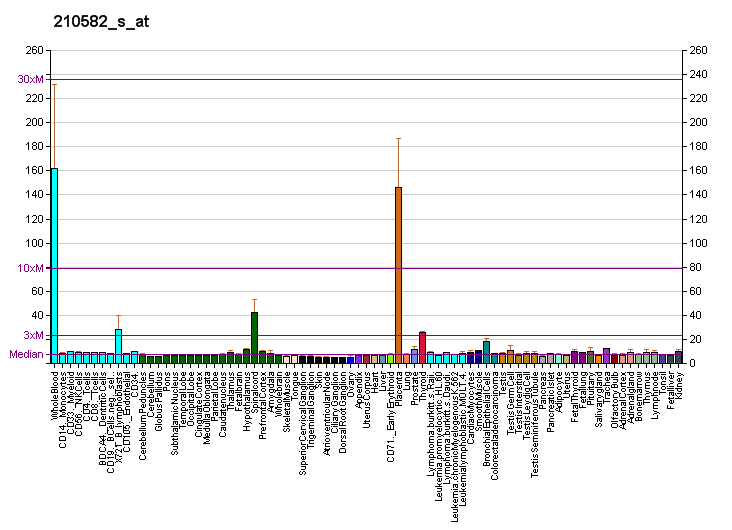

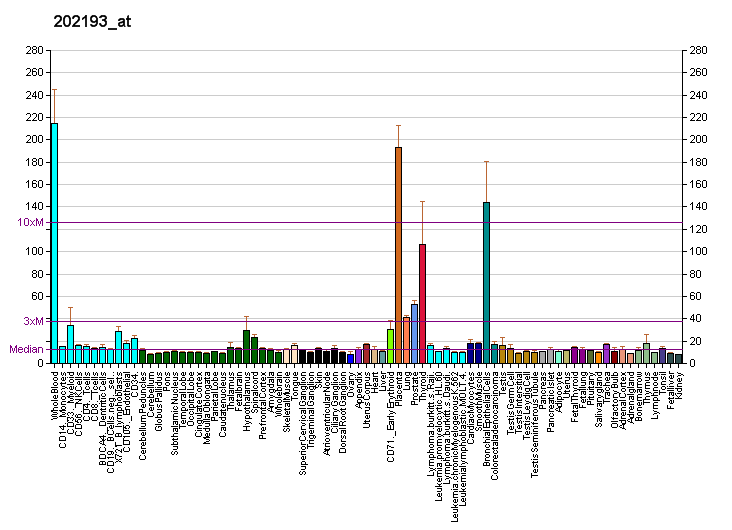
RNA expression pattern
Bgee	Human / Mouse (ortholog); Top expressed in: gingival epithelium; blood; skin of abdomen; skin of leg; hair follicle; right uterine tube; palpebral conjunctiva; minor salivary glands; olfactory zone of nasal mucosa; mucosa of transverse colon / Top expressed in: lip; corneal stroma; gastrula; neural layer of retina; decidua; dentate gyrus of hippocampal formation granule cell; superior frontal gyrus; esophagus; yolk sac; granulocyte; More reference expression data
BioGPS	More reference expression data
Gene ontology
Molecular function	protein serine/threonine kinase activity; ATP binding; protein binding; protein heterodimerization activity; nucleotide binding; kinase activity; metal ion binding; protein kinase activity; transferase activity; signal transducer activity
Cellular component	nucleus; cytoplasm; cis-Golgi network
Biological process	protein phosphorylation; spermatogenesis; phosphorylation; intracellular signal transduction; head development; cornea development in camera-type eye; actin cytoskeleton organization
Sources:Amigo / QuickGO
Orthologs
Databases	NCBI: entry; OMA: entry
Species	Human	Mouse
Entrez	3985	16886
Ensembl	ENSG00000182541	ENSMUSG00000020451
UniProt	P53671	O54785
RefSeq (mRNA)	NM_016733; NM_001031801; NM_005569	NM_001034030; NM_010718; NM_173053; NM_001361623
RefSeq (protein)	NP_001026971; NP_005560; NP_057952	NP_001029202; NP_034848; NP_774958; NP_001348552; NP_001389789 NP_001389790; NP_001389791; NP_001389792; NP_001389793
Location (UCSC)	Chr 22: 31.21 – 31.28 Mb	Chr 11: 3.29 – 3.36 Mb
PubMed search
- Wikidata
View/Edit Human	View/Edit Mouse

LIM domain kinase 2 is an enzyme that in humans is encoded by the LIMK2 gene.

== Function ==
There are approximately 40 known eukaryotic LIM proteins, so named for the LIM domains they contain. LIM domains are highly conserved cysteine-rich structures containing 2 zinc fingers. Although zinc fingers usually function by binding to DNA or RNA, the LIM motif probably mediates protein-protein interactions. LIM kinase-1 and LIM kinase-2 belong to a small subfamily with a unique combination of 2 N-terminal LIM motifs and a C-terminal protein kinase domain. The protein encoded by this gene is phosphorylated and activated by ROCK, a downstream effector of Rho, and the encoded protein, in turn, phosphorylates cofilin, inhibiting its actin-depolymerizing activity. It is thought that this pathway contributes to Rho-induced reorganization of the actin cytoskeleton. At least three transcript variants encoding different isoforms have been found for this gene.
