= SUPT16H =

Protein-coding gene in the species Homo sapiens

Identifiers
- Aliases: SUPT16H, CDC68, FACTP140, SPT16/CDC68, SPT16, SPT16 homolog, facilitates chromatin remodeling subunit, NEDDFAC
- External IDs: OMIM: 605012; MGI: 1890948; GeneCards: SUPT16H
Available structures
| PDB | Ortholog search: PDBe RCSB |
| PDB | List of PDB id codes 5E5B, 4Z2M, 4Z2N |

Gene location (Human)
| Chr. | Chromosome 14 (human) |
| Band | 14q11.2 | Start | 21,351,476 bp |
| Band | 14q11.2 | End | 21,384,019 bp |

Gene location (Mouse)
| Chr. | Chromosome 14 (mouse) |
| Band | 14 C2|14 26.83 cM | Start | 52,397,871 bp |
| Band | 14 C2|14 26.83 cM | End | 52,434,873 bp |
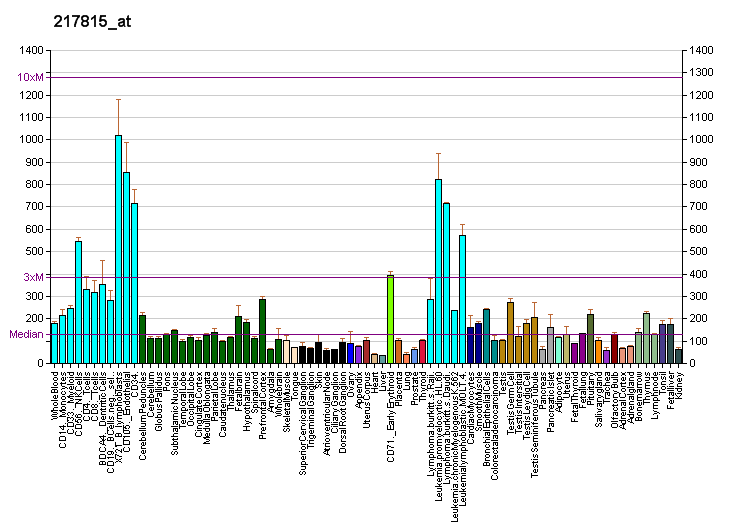
RNA expression pattern
| Bgee | Human / Mouse (ortholog); Top expressed in: ventricular zone; ganglionic eminence; gonad; testicle; Achilles tendon; epithelium of colon; cerebellar hemisphere; right hemisphere of cerebellum; body of uterus; smooth muscle tissue / Top expressed in: fetal liver hematopoietic progenitor cell; genital tubercle; tail of embryo; neural layer of retina; primitive streak; renal corpuscle; epiblast; tibiofemoral joint; medullary collecting duct; pineal gland; More reference expression data |
| BioGPS | More reference expression data |
Gene ontology
| Molecular function | protein binding; nucleosome binding; histone binding; RNA binding |
| Cellular component | nucleus; nucleoplasm; chromosome; FACT complex |
| Biological process | positive regulation of DNA-templated transcription, elongation; DNA replication; nucleosome disassembly; regulation of transcription, DNA-templated; transcription by RNA polymerase II; DNA repair; transcription, DNA-templated; cellular response to DNA damage stimulus; regulation of signal transduction by p53 class mediator; transcription elongation from RNA polymerase II promoter; positive regulation of transcription elongation from RNA polymerase II promoter |
Sources:Amigo / QuickGO
Orthologs
| Databases | NCBI: entry; OMA: entry |
| Species | Human | Mouse |
| Entrez | 11198 | 114741 |
| Ensembl | ENSG00000092201 | ENSMUSG00000035726 |
| UniProt | Q9Y5B9 | Q920B9 |
| RefSeq (mRNA) | NM_007192 | NM_033618 |
| RefSeq (protein) | NP_009123 | NP_291096 |
| Location (UCSC) | Chr 14: 21.35 – 21.38 Mb | Chr 14: 52.4 – 52.43 Mb |
| PubMed search |
- Wikidata
| View/Edit Human | View/Edit Mouse |

FACT complex subunit SPT16 is a protein that in humans is encoded by the SUPT16H gene.

== Function ==
Transcription of protein-coding genes can be reconstituted on naked DNA with only the general transcription factors and RNA polymerase II. However, this minimal system cannot transcribe DNA packaged into chromatin, indicating that accessory factors may facilitate access to DNA. One such factor, FACT (facilitates chromatin transcription), interacts specifically with histones H2A/H2B to effect nucleosome disassembly and transcription elongation. FACT is composed of an 80 kDa subunit and a 140 kDa subunit, the latter of which is the protein encoded by this gene.
