= RFX8 =

Protein-coding gene in humans

Identifiers
- Aliases: RFX8, RFX family member 8, lacking RFX DNA binding domain, regulatory factor X8
- External IDs: MGI: 3588206; GeneCards: RFX8

Gene location (Human)
Chr.	Chromosome 2 (human)
Band	2q11.2	Start	101,397,359 bp
Band	2q11.2	End	101,475,112 bp

Gene location (Mouse)
Chr.	Chromosome 1 (mouse)
Band	1|1 B	Start	39,704,461 bp
Band	1|1 B	End	39,760,157 bp
RNA expression pattern
Bgee	Human / Mouse (ortholog); Top expressed in: testicle; bone marrow; lactiferous gland; tibial nerve; subcutaneous adipose tissue; superior frontal gyrus; bone marrow cell; islet of Langerhans; sural nerve; prefrontal cortex / Top expressed in: spermatid; spermatocyte; seminiferous tubule; lumbar spinal ganglion; embryo; lens; epithelium of lens; sternocleidomastoid muscle; upper arm; triceps brachii muscle; More reference expression data
BioGPS	n/a
Gene ontology
Molecular function	DNA-binding transcription factor activity; RNA polymerase II cis-regulatory region sequence-specific DNA binding; DNA binding; DNA-binding transcription factor activity, RNA polymerase II-specific
Cellular component	nucleus
Biological process	regulation of transcription by RNA polymerase II; regulation of transcription, DNA-templated; transcription, DNA-templated
Sources:Amigo / QuickGO
Orthologs
Databases	NCBI: entry; OMA: entry
Species	Human	Mouse
Entrez	731220	619289
Ensembl	ENSG00000196460	ENSMUSG00000057173
UniProt	Q6ZV50	D3YU81
RefSeq (mRNA)	NM_001145664; NM_207403; NM_001367508; NM_001367509; NM_001367510	NM_001145660
RefSeq (protein)	NP_001139136; NP_001354437; NP_001354438; NP_001354439	NP_001139132
Location (UCSC)	Chr 2: 101.4 – 101.48 Mb	Chr 1: 39.7 – 39.76 Mb
PubMed search
- Wikidata
View/Edit Human	View/Edit Mouse

DNA-binding protein RFX8 is a protein that in humans is encoded by the gene RFX8.
