= RFX4 =

Protein-coding gene in the species Homo sapiens

Identifiers
- Aliases: RFX4, NYD-SP10, regulatory factor X4
- External IDs: OMIM: 603958; MGI: 1918387; GeneCards: RFX4

Gene location (Human)
Chr.	Chromosome 12 (human)
Band	12q23.3	Start	106,583,004 bp
Band	12q23.3	End	106,762,803 bp

Gene location (Mouse)
Chr.	Chromosome 10 (mouse)
Band	10|10 C1	Start	84,591,926 bp
Band	10|10 C1	End	84,742,402 bp
RNA expression pattern
Bgee	Human / Mouse (ortholog); Top expressed in: left testis; right testis; external globus pallidus; ventricular zone; internal globus pallidus; sperm; caudate nucleus; amygdala; nucleus accumbens; superior vestibular nucleus / Top expressed in: lumbar subsegment of spinal cord; spermatocyte; spermatid; suprachiasmatic nucleus; Rostral migratory stream; globus pallidus; ventricular zone; deep cerebellar nuclei; seminiferous tubule; dorsal tegmental nucleus; More reference expression data
BioGPS	n/a
Gene ontology
Molecular function	RNA polymerase II cis-regulatory region sequence-specific DNA binding; DNA binding; DNA-binding transcription activator activity, RNA polymerase II-specific; chromatin binding; protein binding; DNA-binding transcription factor activity, RNA polymerase II-specific; DNA-binding transcription factor activity
Cellular component	nucleus
Biological process	regulation of transcription by RNA polymerase II; forebrain development; telencephalon development; dorsal spinal cord development; regulation of transcription, DNA-templated; negative regulation of smoothened signaling pathway involved in ventral spinal cord patterning; cerebellar cortex morphogenesis; midbrain development; positive regulation of transcription by RNA polymerase II; regulation of protein processing; transcription, DNA-templated; transcription by RNA polymerase II; cilium assembly
Sources:Amigo / QuickGO
Orthologs
Databases	NCBI: entry; OMA: entry
Species	Human	Mouse
Entrez	5992	71137
Ensembl	ENSG00000111783	ENSMUSG00000020037
UniProt	Q33E94	Q7TNK1
RefSeq (mRNA)	NM_213594; NM_001206691; NM_002920; NM_032491	NM_001024918; NM_027689
RefSeq (protein)	NP_001193620; NP_115880; NP_998759	NP_001020089; NP_081965
Location (UCSC)	Chr 12: 106.58 – 106.76 Mb	Chr 10: 84.59 – 84.74 Mb
PubMed search
- Wikidata
View/Edit Human	View/Edit Mouse

Transcription factor RFX4 is a protein that in humans is encoded by the RFX4 gene.

This gene is a member of the regulatory factor X gene family, which encodes transcription factors that contain a highly conserved winged helix DNA binding domain. The protein encoded by this gene is structurally related to regulatory factors X1, X2, X3, and X5. It has been shown to interact with itself as well as with regulatory factors X2 and X3, but it does not interact with regulatory factor X1. This protein may be a transcriptional repressor rather than a transcriptional activator. Three transcript variants encoding different isoforms have been described for this gene.

RFX4 has been implicated in neural-lineage specification and in glioblastoma cell-state control: pooled transcription-factor overexpression with single-cell RNA-seq identified RFX4 as sufficient to induce neural progenitor–like programs from human pluripotent stem cells that differentiate toward CNS neuron and glia lineages, and in glioblastoma, RFX4 was reported as an orchestrator of growth and differentiation in diffusely invading tumor cells, where perturbation redistributed invasion routes and extended survival in xenografts.
