= NFIA =

Protein-coding gene in humans

Identifiers
- Aliases: NFIA, CTF, NF-I/A, NF1-A, NFI-A, NFI-L, nuclear factor I A, BRMUTD
- External IDs: OMIM: 600727; MGI: 108056; GeneCards: NFIA

Gene location (Human)
Chr.	Chromosome 1 (human)
Band	1p31.3	Start	60,865,259 bp
Band	1p31.3	End	61,462,788 bp

Gene location (Mouse)
Chr.	Chromosome 4 (mouse)
Band	4 C5- C6|4 45.52 cM	Start	97,660,971 bp
Band	4 C5- C6|4 45.52 cM	End	98,007,111 bp
RNA expression pattern
Bgee	Human / Mouse (ortholog); Top expressed in: internal globus pallidus; urethra; saphenous vein; vena cava; buccal mucosa cell; cardia; nipple; parietal pleura; endothelial cell; synovial joint / Top expressed in: seminal vesicula; vestibular membrane of cochlear duct; vestibular sensory epithelium; external carotid artery; Rostral migratory stream; internal carotid artery; lobe of cerebellum; cerebellar vermis; atrioventricular valve; facial motor nucleus; More reference expression data
BioGPS	n/a
Gene ontology
Molecular function	DNA-binding transcription factor activity; RNA polymerase II cis-regulatory region sequence-specific DNA binding; DNA binding; DNA-binding transcription activator activity, RNA polymerase II-specific; transcription factor binding; chromatin binding; protein binding; DNA-binding transcription factor activity, RNA polymerase II-specific
Cellular component	cell junction; intracellular anatomical structure; nucleus; nucleoplasm
Biological process	viral genome replication; DNA replication; regulation of transcription, DNA-templated; negative regulation of transcription by RNA polymerase II; transcription, DNA-templated; synapse maturation; transcription by RNA polymerase II; positive regulation of transcription by RNA polymerase II; ureter development
Sources:Amigo / QuickGO
Orthologs
Databases	NCBI: entry; OMA: entry
Species	Human	Mouse
Entrez	4774	18027
Ensembl	ENSG00000162599	ENSMUSG00000028565
UniProt	Q12857	Q02780
RefSeq (mRNA)	NM_001134673; NM_001145511; NM_001145512; NM_005595	NM_001122952; NM_001122953; NM_010905
RefSeq (protein)	NP_001128145; NP_001138983; NP_001138984; NP_005586	NP_001116424; NP_001116425; NP_035035
Location (UCSC)	Chr 1: 60.87 – 61.46 Mb	Chr 4: 97.66 – 98.01 Mb
PubMed search
- Wikidata
View/Edit Human	View/Edit Mouse

Nuclear factor 1 A-type is a protein that in humans is encoded by the NFIA gene.

== Function ==
Nuclear factor I (NFI) proteins constitute a family of dimeric DNA-binding proteins with similar, and possibly identical, DNA-binding specificity. They function as cellular transcription factors and as replication factors for adenovirus DNA replication. Diversity in this protein family is generated by multiple genes, differential splicing, and heterodimerization.[supplied by OMIM]
