= RFX2 =

Protein-coding gene in the species Homo sapiens

Identifiers
- Aliases: RFX2, regulatory factor X2
- External IDs: OMIM: 142765; MGI: 106583; GeneCards: RFX2

Gene location (Human)
Chr.	Chromosome 19 (human)
Band	19p13.3	Start	5,993,164 bp
Band	19p13.3	End	6,199,572 bp

Gene location (Mouse)
Chr.	Chromosome 17 (mouse)
Band	17 D|17 29.5 cM	Start	57,082,897 bp
Band	17 D|17 29.5 cM	End	57,138,013 bp
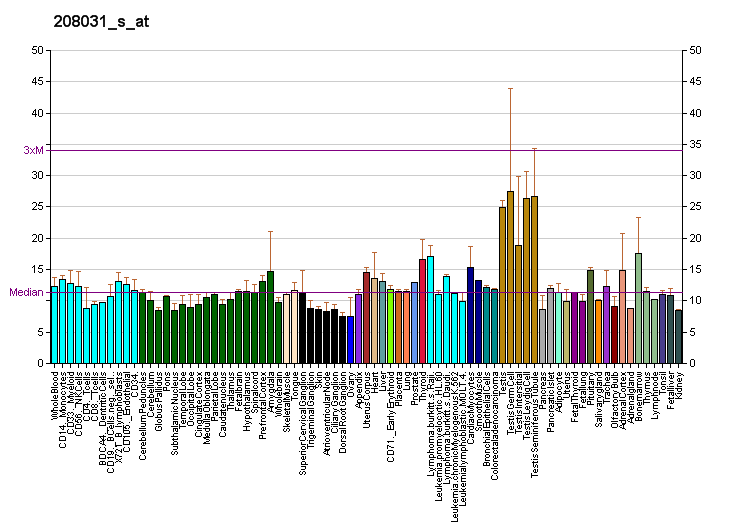
RNA expression pattern
Bgee	Human / Mouse (ortholog); Top expressed in: right uterine tube; left testis; right testis; bronchial epithelial cell; left uterine tube; olfactory zone of nasal mucosa; muscle layer of sigmoid colon; body of uterus; sural nerve; left ovary / Top expressed in: seminiferous tubule; spermatid; spermatocyte; zygote; secondary oocyte; ascending aorta; choroid plexus of fourth ventricle; primary oocyte; blood; fetal liver hematopoietic progenitor cell; More reference expression data
BioGPS	More reference expression data
Gene ontology
Molecular function	DNA binding; RNA polymerase II cis-regulatory region sequence-specific DNA binding; DNA-binding transcription factor activity; protein binding; RNA polymerase II transcription regulatory region sequence-specific DNA binding; DNA-binding transcription factor activity, RNA polymerase II-specific
Cellular component	nucleus; cytoplasm
Biological process	regulation of transcription, DNA-templated; transcription, DNA-templated; cell differentiation; spermatogenesis; acrosome assembly; spermatid development; regulation of transcription by RNA polymerase II; cell projection organization; cilium assembly; positive regulation of transcription by RNA polymerase II; cellular response to leukemia inhibitory factor
Sources:Amigo / QuickGO
Orthologs
Databases	NCBI: entry; OMA: entry
Species	Human	Mouse
Entrez	5990	19725
Ensembl	ENSG00000087903	ENSMUSG00000024206
UniProt	P48378	P48379
RefSeq (mRNA)	NM_000635; NM_134433	NM_009056; NM_027787
RefSeq (protein)	NP_000626; NP_602309	NP_033082; NP_082063
Location (UCSC)	Chr 19: 5.99 – 6.2 Mb	Chr 17: 57.08 – 57.14 Mb
PubMed search
- Wikidata
View/Edit Human	View/Edit Mouse

DNA-binding protein RFX2 is a protein that in humans is encoded by the RFX2 gene.

This gene is a member of the regulatory factor X gene family, which encodes transcription factors that contain a highly-conserved winged helix DNA binding domain. The protein encoded by this gene is structurally related to regulatory factors X1, X3, X4, and X5. It is a transcriptional activator that can bind DNA as a monomer or as a heterodimer with other RFX family members. This protein can bind to cis elements in the promoter of the IL-5 receptor alpha gene. Two transcript variants encoding different isoforms have been described for this gene, and both variants utilize alternative polyadenylation sites.
