= RFX3 =

Protein-coding gene in the species Homo sapiens

Identifiers
- Aliases: RFX3, regulatory factor X3
- External IDs: OMIM: 601337; MGI: 106582; GeneCards: RFX3

Gene location (Human)
| Chr. | Chromosome 9 (human) |
| Band | 9p24.2 | Start | 3,218,297 bp |
| Band | 9p24.2 | End | 3,526,004 bp |

Gene location (Mouse)
| Chr. | Chromosome 19 (mouse) |
| Band | 19|19 C1 | Start | 27,739,121 bp |
| Band | 19|19 C1 | End | 27,988,566 bp |
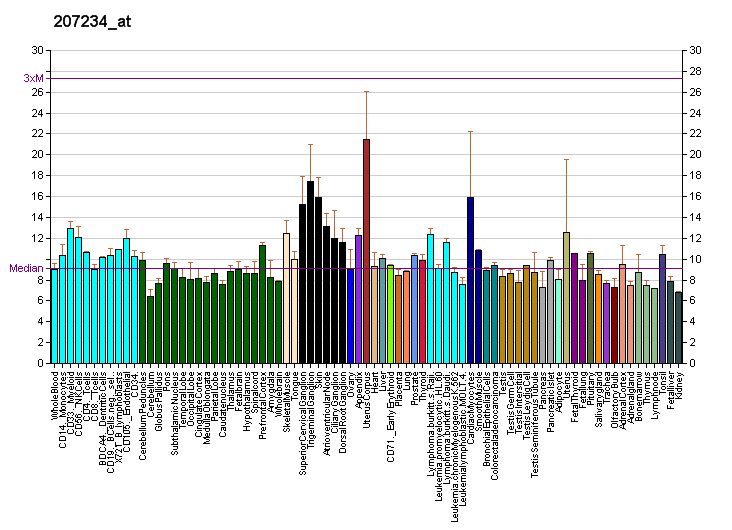
RNA expression pattern
| Bgee | Human / Mouse (ortholog); Top expressed in: bronchial epithelial cell; mucosa of paranasal sinus; Brodmann area 23; middle temporal gyrus; cerebellar vermis; right uterine tube; caput epididymis; ventricular zone; corpus callosum; entorhinal cortex / Top expressed in: olfactory epithelium; Epithelium of choroid plexus; piriform cortex; medial ganglionic eminence; anterior amygdaloid area; dentate gyrus; tail of embryo; Region I of hippocampus proper; primitive streak; olfactory tubercle; More reference expression data |
| BioGPS | More reference expression data |
Gene ontology
| Molecular function | DNA binding; sequence-specific DNA binding; DNA-binding transcription factor activity; RNA polymerase II cis-regulatory region sequence-specific DNA binding; protein binding; transcription factor activity, RNA polymerase II distal enhancer sequence-specific binding; DNA-binding transcription factor activity, RNA polymerase II-specific |
| Cellular component | transcription regulator complex; nucleus; extracellular region |
| Biological process | cell differentiation; regulation of transcription, DNA-templated; positive regulation of type B pancreatic cell development; regulation of insulin secretion; epithelial cilium movement involved in determination of left/right asymmetry; cell maturation; transcription, DNA-templated; positive regulation of transcription, DNA-templated; multicellular organism development; type B pancreatic cell maturation; determination of left/right symmetry; negative regulation of transcription, DNA-templated; cilium-dependent cell motility; endocrine pancreas development; positive regulation of transcription by RNA polymerase II; type B pancreatic cell differentiation; cilium assembly; regulation of transcription by RNA polymerase II |
Sources:Amigo / QuickGO
Orthologs
| Databases | NCBI: entry; OMA: entry |
| Species | Human | Mouse |
| Entrez | 5991 | 19726 |
| Ensembl | ENSG00000080298 | ENSMUSG00000040929 |
| UniProt | P48380 | P48381 |
| RefSeq (mRNA) | NM_001282116; NM_001282117; NM_002919; NM_134428; NM_001377999 | NM_001166414; NM_011265; NM_001360357; NM_001360358 |
| RefSeq (protein) | NP_001269045; NP_001269046; NP_002910; NP_602304; NP_001364928 | NP_001159886; NP_035395; NP_001347286; NP_001347287 |
| Location (UCSC) | Chr 9: 3.22 – 3.53 Mb | Chr 19: 27.74 – 27.99 Mb |
| PubMed search |
- Wikidata
| View/Edit Human | View/Edit Mouse |

Transcription factor RFX3 is a protein that in humans is encoded by the RFX3 gene.

This gene is a member of the regulatory factor X gene family, which encodes transcription factors that contain a highly-conserved winged helix DNA binding domain. The protein encoded by this gene is structurally related to regulatory factors X1, X2, X4, and X5. It is a transcriptional activator that can bind DNA as a monomer or as a heterodimer with other RFX family members. Two transcript variants encoding different isoforms have been described for this gene, and at least one of the variants utilizes alternative polyadenylation signals.
