= NFIC (gene) =

Protein-coding gene in the species Homo sapiens

Identifiers
- Aliases: NFIC, CTF, CTF5, NF-I, NFI, nuclear factor I C
- External IDs: OMIM: 600729; MGI: 109591; GeneCards: NFIC

Gene location (Human)
| Chr. | Chromosome 19 (human) |
| Band | 19p13.3 | Start | 3,314,403 bp |
| Band | 19p13.3 | End | 3,469,217 bp |

Gene location (Mouse)
| Chr. | Chromosome 10 (mouse) |
| Band | 10 C1|10 39.72 cM | Start | 81,232,020 bp |
| Band | 10 C1|10 39.72 cM | End | 81,291,469 bp |
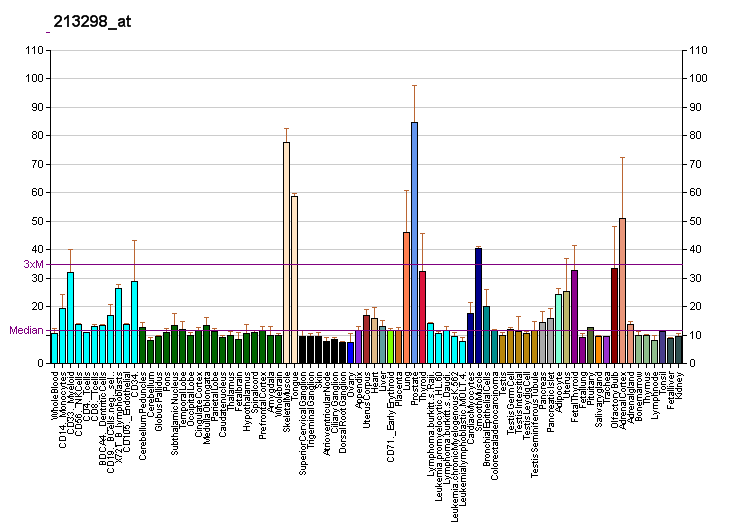

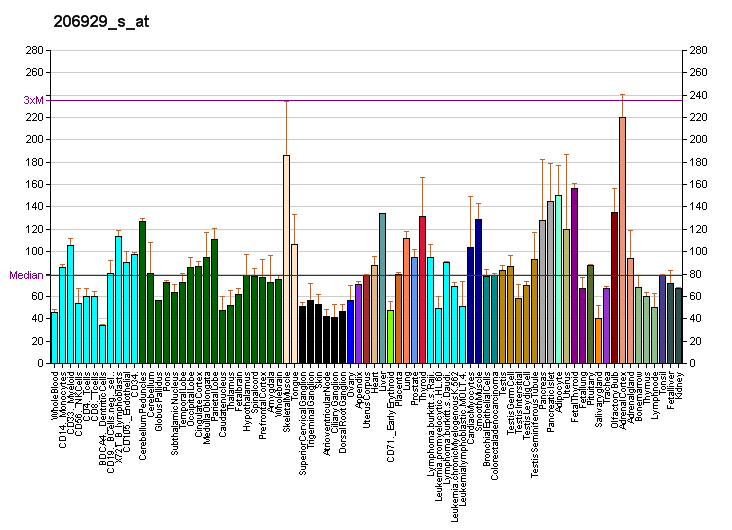
RNA expression pattern
| Bgee | Human / Mouse (ortholog); Top expressed in: nipple; parotid gland; cardia; pylorus; seminal vesicula; renal medulla; pericardium; urethra; trigeminal ganglion; body of tongue / Top expressed in: ankle; lacrimal gland; triceps brachii muscle; aortic valve; extensor digitorum longus muscle; muscle of thigh; ascending aorta; plantaris muscle; vestibular membrane of cochlear duct; internal carotid artery; More reference expression data |
| BioGPS | More reference expression data |
Gene ontology
| Molecular function | DNA-binding transcription factor activity; RNA polymerase II cis-regulatory region sequence-specific DNA binding; DNA binding; DNA-binding transcription activator activity, RNA polymerase II-specific; double-stranded DNA binding; cis-regulatory region sequence-specific DNA binding; DNA-binding transcription factor activity, RNA polymerase II-specific |
| Cellular component | intracellular anatomical structure; nucleus; fibrillar center |
| Biological process | odontogenesis of dentin-containing tooth; DNA replication; negative regulation of transcription, DNA-templated; regulation of transcription, DNA-templated; transcription by RNA polymerase II; transcription, DNA-templated; positive regulation of transcription by RNA polymerase II; negative regulation of transcription by RNA polymerase II |
Sources:Amigo / QuickGO
Orthologs
| Databases | NCBI: entry; OMA: entry |
| Species | Human | Mouse |
| Entrez | 4782 | 18029 |
| Ensembl | ENSG00000141905 | ENSMUSG00000055053 |
| UniProt | P08651 | P70255 |
| RefSeq (mRNA) | NM_001245002; NM_001245004; NM_001245005; NM_005597; NM_205843 | NM_008688; NM_026756 |
| RefSeq (protein) | NP_001231931; NP_001231933; NP_001231934; NP_005588; NP_995315 | NP_032714; NP_081032 |
| Location (UCSC) | Chr 19: 3.31 – 3.47 Mb | Chr 10: 81.23 – 81.29 Mb |
| PubMed search |
- Wikidata
| View/Edit Human | View/Edit Mouse |

Nuclear factor 1 C-type is a protein that in humans is encoded by the NFIC gene.
