= NFIX =

Protein-coding gene in the species Homo sapiens

Identifiers
- Aliases: NFIX, MRSHSS, NF1A, SOTOS2, nuclear factor I X, NF1-X, NF-I/X, CTF, MALNS
- External IDs: OMIM: 164005; MGI: 97311; GeneCards: NFIX

Gene location (Human)
Chr.	Chromosome 19 (human)
Band	19p13.13	Start	12,995,475 bp
Band	19p13.13	End	13,098,796 bp

Gene location (Mouse)
Chr.	Chromosome 8 (mouse)
Band	8 C2|8 41.02 cM	Start	84,699,876 bp
Band	8 C2|8 41.02 cM	End	84,800,344 bp
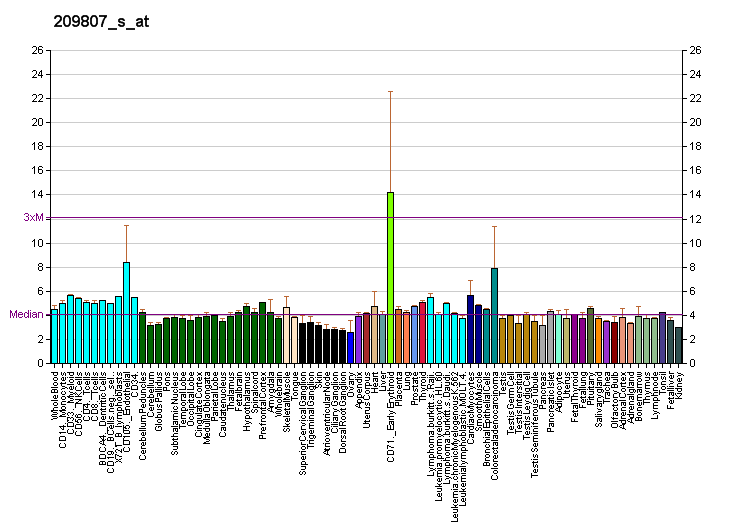
RNA expression pattern
Bgee	Human / Mouse (ortholog); Top expressed in: nipple; ganglionic eminence; inferior ganglion of vagus nerve; postcentral gyrus; internal globus pallidus; ventral tegmental area; tendon of biceps brachii; buccal mucosa cell; cardia; urethra / Top expressed in: Rostral migratory stream; internal carotid artery; external carotid artery; ankle; utricle; tunica media of zone of aorta; subiculum; ascending aorta; lacrimal gland; vestibular membrane of cochlear duct; More reference expression data
BioGPS	More reference expression data
Gene ontology
Molecular function	DNA-binding transcription factor activity; transcription factor activity, RNA polymerase II distal enhancer sequence-specific binding; DNA binding; protein binding; DNA-binding transcription factor activity, RNA polymerase II-specific
Cellular component	intracellular anatomical structure; nucleus
Biological process	DNA replication; regulation of transcription, DNA-templated; negative regulation of transcription by RNA polymerase II; transcription by RNA polymerase II; transcription, DNA-templated; positive regulation of transcription by RNA polymerase II
Sources:Amigo / QuickGO
Orthologs
Databases	NCBI: entry; OMA: entry
Species	Human	Mouse
Entrez	4784	18032
Ensembl	ENSG00000008441	ENSMUSG00000001911
UniProt	Q14938	P70257
RefSeq (mRNA)	NM_001271043; NM_001271044; NM_002501; NM_001365902; NM_001365982 NM_001365983; NM_001365984; NM_001365985; NM_001378404; NM_001378405	NM_001081981; NM_001081982; NM_001297601; NM_010906
RefSeq (protein)	NP_001257972; NP_001257973; NP_002492; NP_001352831; NP_001352911 NP_001352912; NP_001352913; NP_001352914; NP_001365333; NP_001365334	NP_001075450; NP_001075451; NP_001284530; NP_035036; NP_001357981 NP_001357982; NP_001357983; NP_001357984; NP_001357985; NP_001357986; NP_001357987; NP_001357988; NP_001357989; NP_001357990; NP_001357991; NP_001357992
Location (UCSC)	Chr 19: 13 – 13.1 Mb	Chr 8: 84.7 – 84.8 Mb
PubMed search
- Wikidata
View/Edit Human	View/Edit Mouse

Nuclear factor 1 X-type is a protein that in humans is encoded by the NFIX gene. NFI-X3, a splice variant of NFIX, regulates Glial fibrillary acidic protein and YKL-40 in astrocytes.

== Interactions ==
Nfix has been shown to interact with SKI protein and it is also known to interact with AP-1. NFI-X3 has been shown to interact with STAT3.

In embryonic cells, Nfix has been shown to regulate intermediate progenitor cell (IPC) generation by promoting the transcription of the protein inscuteable (INSC). INSC regulates spindle orientation to facilitate the division of radial glia cells into IPC's. Nfix is thought to be necessary for the commitment of glia progeny into the intermediate progenitors. Mutations may cause overproduction of radial glia, impaired and improperly timed IPC development, and underproduction of neurons.

In adult development, the timing of neural differentiation is regulated by Nfix to promote ongoing growth of the hippocampus and proper memory function. Nfix may suppress oligodendrocyte expression so cells remain committed to neuron development within the dentate gyrus. Intermediate progenitor cells can divide to produce neuroblasts. Neurons produced by Nfix null IPC's do not mature, usually die, and can contribute to cognitive impairments.

Nfix interacts with myostatin and regulates temporal progression of muscle regeneration through modulation of myostatin expression. Nfix also inhibits the slow-twitch muscle phenotype.
