= TBP-associated factor =

Protein domains

TBP associated factor (TAF6)
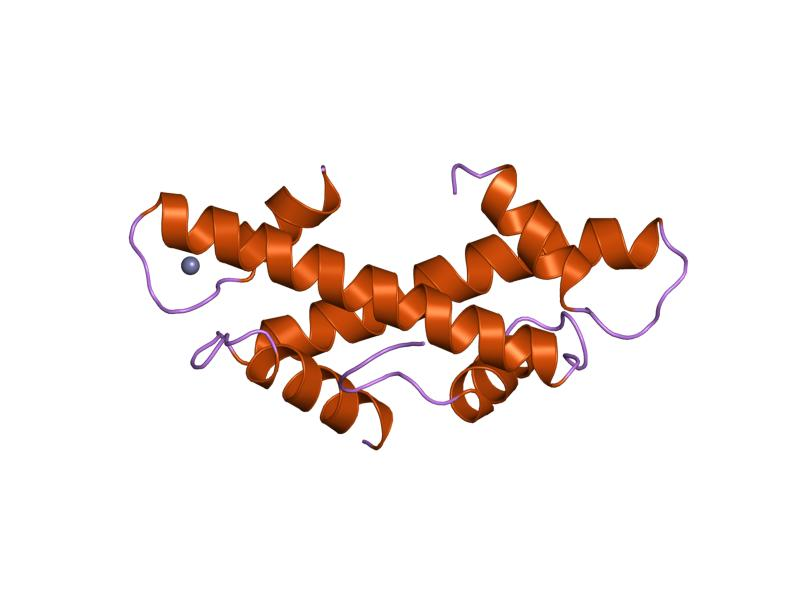
- drosophila dtafii42/dtafii62 (like TAF6/TAF9) heterotetramer, HFD

Identifiers
- Symbol: TAF
- Pfam: PF02969
- Pfam clan: CL0012
- InterPro: IPR004823
- SCOP2: 1bh9 / SCOPe / SUPFAM
Available protein structures:
- PDB: IPR004823 PF02969 (ECOD; PDBsum)
- AlphaFold: IPR004823; PF02969

The TBP-associated factors (TAF) are proteins that associate with the TATA-binding protein in transcription initiation. It is a part of the transcription initiation factor TFIID multimeric protein complex. It also makes up many other factors, including SL1. They mediate the formation of the transcription preinitiation complex, a step preceding transcription of DNA to RNA by RNA polymerase II.

TAFs have a signature N-terminal histone-like fold domain (HFD). This domain is implicated in the pairwise interaction among specific TAFs.

== Function ==
=== TFIID ===
TFIID plays a central role in mediating promoter responses to various activators and repressors. It binds tightly to TAFII-250 and directly interacts with TAFII-40. TFIID is composed of TATA binding protein (TBP) and a number of TBP-associated factors (TAFS).

TAF is part of the TFIID complex, and interacts with the following:

- Specific transcriptional activators
- Basal transcription factors
- Other TAFIIs
- Specific DNA sequences, for example the downstream promoter element or gene-specific core promoter sequence

Due to such interactions, they contribute transcription activation and to promoter selectivity.

Some pairs of TAF interact with each other to form "lobes" in TFIID. Pairs known or suggested to exist in TFIID include TAF6-TAF9, TAF4-TAF12, TAF11-13, TAF8-TAF10 and TAF3-TAF10.

=== SL1 ===
Selective factor 1 is composed of the TATA-binding protein and three TAF (TATA box-binding protein-associated factor) subunits (TAF1A, TAF1B, and TAF1C). These TAFs do not have a histone-like fold domain.

=== Other complexes ===
TAF is a part of SAGA (SPT-ADA-GCN5 acetylase) and related coactivation complexes. Such complexes acetylate histone tails to activate genes. Human has three SAGA-like complexes: PCAF, TFTC (TBP-free TAF-containing complex), and STAGA (SPT3-TAF9-GCN5L acetylase). PCAF (GCN5) and KAT2A (GCN5L) are two human homologs of the yeast Gcn5.

TAF8, TAF10, and SPT7L forms a small TAF complex called SMAT.

== Structure ==
The N-terminal domain of TAF has a histone-like protein fold. It contains two short alpha helices and a long central alpha helix.

== Human genes ==
- TAF1 (TAFII250)
- TAF2 (CIF150)
- TAF3 (TAFII140)
- TAF4 (TAFII130/135)
- TAF4B (TAFII105)
- TAF5 (TAFII100)
- TAF6 (TAFII70/80)
  - TAF6L (PAF65A)
- TAF7 (TAFII55)
- TAF8 (TAFII43)
- TAF9 (TAFII31/32)
- TAF9B (TAFII31L)
- TAF10 (TAFII30)
- TAF11 (TAFII28)
- TAF12 (TAFII20/15)
- TAF13 (TAFII18)
- TAF15 (TAFII68)

== Assorted signatures ==
TAF domains are spread out across many digital signatures:

TAF4

Identifiers
- Symbol: TAF4
- Pfam: PF05236
- InterPro: IPR007900
Available protein structures:
- PDB: IPR007900 PF05236 (ECOD; PDBsum)
- AlphaFold: IPR007900; PF05236

TAF

Identifiers
- Symbol: ?
- Pfam: PF04719
Available protein structures:
- PDB: PF04719 (ECOD; PDBsum)
- AlphaFold: PF04719

TAF13

Identifiers
- Symbol: TFIID-18kDa
- Pfam: PF02269
- InterPro: IPR003195
Available protein structures:
- PDB: IPR003195 PF02269 (ECOD; PDBsum)
- AlphaFold: IPR003195; PF02269

TAFII31 (TAF9)

Identifiers
- Symbol: TFIID-31kDa
- Pfam: PF02291
- InterPro: IPR003162
Available protein structures:
- PDB: IPR003162 PF02291 (ECOD; PDBsum)
- AlphaFold: IPR003162; PF02291

TAF

Identifiers
- Symbol: ?
- Pfam: PF03847
Available protein structures:
- PDB: PF03847 (ECOD; PDBsum)
- AlphaFold: PF03847

TAF

Identifiers
- Symbol: ?
- Pfam: PF03540
Available protein structures:
- PDB: PF03540 (ECOD; PDBsum)
- AlphaFold: PF03540

TAF/Nervy homology (TAF4/4B)

Identifiers
- Symbol: TAFH
- Pfam: PF07531
- InterPro: IPR003894
- SMART: TAFH
Available protein structures:
- PDB: IPR003894 PF07531 (ECOD; PDBsum)
- AlphaFold: IPR003894; PF07531

TAF RNA Polymerase I subunit A (TAF1A)

Identifiers
- Symbol: TAF1_subA
- Pfam: PF14929
- InterPro: IPR039495
Available protein structures:
- PDB: IPR039495 PF14929 (ECOD; PDBsum)
- AlphaFold: IPR039495; PF14929
