= Transcription factor II D =

General transcription factors

Transcription factor II D (TF_{II}D) is one of several general transcription factors that make up the RNA polymerase II preinitiation complex. RNA polymerase II holoenzyme is a form of eukaryotic RNA polymerase II that is recruited to the promoters of protein-coding genes in living cells. It consists of RNA polymerase II, a subset of general transcription factors, and regulatory proteins known as SRB proteins. Before the start of transcription, the transcription Factor II D (TF_{II}D) complex binds to the core promoter DNA of the gene through specific recognition of promoter sequence motifs, including the TATA box, Initiator, Downstream Promoter, Motif Ten, or Downstream Regulatory elements.

== Functions ==
- Coordinates the activities of more than 70 polypeptides required for initiation of transcription by RNA polymerase II
- Binds to the core promoter to position the polymerase properly
- Serves as the scaffold for assembly of the remainder of the transcription complex
- Acts as a channel for regulatory signals

== Structure ==
TF_{II}D is itself composed of TBP and several subunits called TATA-binding protein Associated Factors (TBP-associated factors, or TAFs). In a test tube, only TBP is necessary for transcription at promoters that contain a TATA box. TAFs, however, add promoter selectivity, especially if there is no TATA box sequence for TBP to bind to. TAFs are included in two distinct complexes, TF_{II}D and B-TF_{II}D. The TF_{II}D complex is composed of TBP and more than eight TAFs. But, the majority of TBP is present in the B-TF_{II}D complex, which is composed of TBP and TAFII170 (BTAF1) in a 1:1 ratio. TF_{II}D and B-TF_{II}D are not equivalent, since transcription reactions utilizing TF_{II}D are responsive to gene specific transcription factors such as SP1, while reactions reconstituted with B-TF_{II}D are not.

Subunits in the TF_{II}D complex include:

- TBP (TATA binding protein), or:
  - TBP-related factors in animals (TBPL1; TBPL2)
- TAF1 (TAFII250)
- TAF2 (CIF150)
- TAF3 (TAFII140)
- TAF4 (TAFII130/135)
- TAF4B (TAFII105)
- TAF5 (TAFII100)
- TAF6 (TAFII70/80)
- TAF7 (TAFII55)
- TAF8 (TAFII43)
- TAF9 (TAFII31/32)
- TAF9B (TAFII31L)
- TAF10 (TAFII30)
- TAF11 (TAFII28)
- TAF12 (TAFII20/15)
- TAF13 (TAFII18)
- TAF15 (TAFII68)

== See also ==
- Eukaryotic transcription
- General transcription factor
- Preinitiation complex
- Regulation of gene expression
- RNA polymerase II holoenzyme
- TATA binding protein
- Transcription (genetics)
