= Scutellum =

Scutellum may refer to:

- Scutellum (insect anatomy), a term used in the anatomy of arthropods
- Scutellum (botany), a term used in the morphology of grasses
- Scutellum (trilobite), a genus of trilobites

== See also ==
- Scutella (echinoderm), a prehistoric echinoid genus
