= TAF7l =

Protein

TAF7L

Identifiers
- Aliases: TAF7L, CT40, TAF2Q, TATA-box binding protein associated factor 7 like
- External IDs: OMIM: 300314; MGI: 1921719; HomoloGene: 83311; GeneCards: TAF7L; OMA:TAF7L - orthologs

Gene location (Human)
Chr.	X chromosome (human)
Band	Xq22.1	Start	101,268,253 bp
Band	Xq22.1	End	101,293,057 bp

Gene location (Mouse)
Chr.	X chromosome (mouse)
Band	X|X E3	Start	133,360,867 bp
Band	X|X E3	End	133,377,239 bp
RNA expression pattern
Bgee	Human / Mouse (ortholog); Top expressed in: right testis; left testis; gonad; testicle; stromal cell of endometrium; canal of the cervix; nucleus accumbens; skin of leg; right lobe of liver; seminal vesicula / Top expressed in: spermatid; seminiferous tubule; spermatocyte; embryo; decidua; embryo; Gonadal ridge; ovary; primary visual cortex; superior frontal gyrus; More reference expression data
BioGPS	n/a
Gene ontology
Molecular function	transcription coactivator activity; transcription factor binding; histone acetyltransferase binding; molecular function
Cellular component	cytoplasm; transcription factor TFIID complex; nucleus
Biological process	regulation of transcription by RNA polymerase II; multicellular organism development; cell differentiation; RNA polymerase II preinitiation complex assembly; transcription initiation from RNA polymerase II promoter; regulation of transcription, DNA-templated; spermatogenesis; transcription, DNA-templated; biological process; positive regulation of nucleic acid-templated transcription
Sources:Amigo / QuickGO
Orthologs
Species	Human	Mouse
Entrez	54457	74469
Ensembl	ENSG00000102387	ENSMUSG00000009596
UniProt	Q5H9L4	Q9D3R9
RefSeq (mRNA)	NM_001168474; NM_024885	NM_028958
RefSeq (protein)	NP_001161946; NP_079161	NP_083234
Location (UCSC)	Chr X: 101.27 – 101.29 Mb	Chr X: 133.36 – 133.38 Mb
PubMed search
- Wikidata
View/Edit Human	View/Edit Mouse

TATA-box binding protein associated factor 7-like also known as CT40 is a protein that in humans is encoded by the TAF7l gene. It is a close homologue to the TAF7 gene, although its function may be different. Currently, little is known about this gene. It was originally demonstrated to be a testis-specific gene based on RT-PCR experiments on tissue extracts, however, it has now been found in white and brown adipose tissue, as well as in certain types of cancer.

== Function ==
=== Function in Adipose Tissue Formation ===
Studies conducted on knockout animals have revealed that Taf7l makes important contributions in determining the fate of mesenchymal stem cells. Importantly, Zhou et al. found that in Taf7L^{−/−} (Taf7L knockout)animals have decreased fat pads that are infiltrated by skeletal muscle tissue. Using RNA-seq and Gene Ontology Enrichment (GO), this same group found that there was an increase in GO terms (and thus gene categories) that werew involved in skeletal and muscle development. Combined with in vitro evidence, it appears that Taf7l is capable of initiating brown fat (the so-called healthy fat) production. Additionally, they found that together with PPARgamma, Taf7l likely can regulate the binding of the TFIID/RNA Polymerase II (RNAP II) complex. Specifically, the presence of Taf7l may alter chromatin looping and thus the association of distal enhancer sequences to BAT specific gene promoters, like Cidea and Scd1.

=== Function in Cancer ===
Recently, frameshift mutation was found to be present in 3 patients with colorectal cancer. Specifically, a poly-A mono-nucleotide repeat region in Exon 6 of Taf7l was found to be missing one nucleotide (deletion mutation), resulting in a frameshift mutation. It has additionally been found to be decreased in 58% of Acute Myelogenous Leukemai (AML).

=== Function in spermatogenesis: Reciprocity with TAF7 ===
Much of the initial work came from Pointud et al. They found that Taf7l has dual functionality during spermatogenesis. In early stage spermatocytes, for example in primary spermatocytes (still diploid at this point), TAF7l is located in the cytoplasm, while TATA-binding protein (TBP) complex is located in the nucleus. Then, TAF7l slowly transitions to the nucleus during the mid-stage pachytene cell, where there is also a dramatic increase in TBP protein expression in the nucleus as well. Additionally, there is a reciprocal relationship to that of TAF7 expression: Unlike TAF7l, TAF7 at early stages is expressed in the nucleus, and thus separated from TAF7l. Then, at later stages, when TAF7l transitions into the nucleus, which happens around the time when the somatic (diploid) to germ cell (haploid) transition occurs, TAF7 dramatically declines. This may indicate that TAF7l plays an important role in regulating the TFIID during development of the sperm. Pointud et al. (2003) speculate that TAF7l may "bookmark" certain genes for expression or repression in the haploid spermatocyte.

=== Function during Transcription ===
A definitive role for TAF7l during transcription still remains elusive. Yeast-2-hybrid screens have identified that TAF7l strongly interacts with TAF1 in exactly the same region (amino acids 1170-1226 of TAF1) that TAF7 binds to and inactivates TAF1's acetyltransferase (AT) function. Thus, it is likely that TAF7l shares a similar role to TAF7, in inhibiting TAF1 and thus, the activity of the TFIID complex. TAF7l localizes in a different compartment relative to TBP during early spermatogenesis, implying a TBP-independent function that awaits further study. Additionally, Chromosome Conformation Capture, has identified a role of TAF7 in directly mediating binding of enhancer elements to promoter sequences that TFIID binds to. This further suggests that TAF7l replaces the function of TAF7, as TAF7 has also been demonstrated to bind to and regulate gene (Vitamin D3 or Thyroid Hormone, for example) expression in a promoter specific fashion

- G. S. Gupta (2 Jul 2006). Proteomics of Spermatogenesis. Springer Science & Business Media. p. 327. ISBN 9780387276557.
