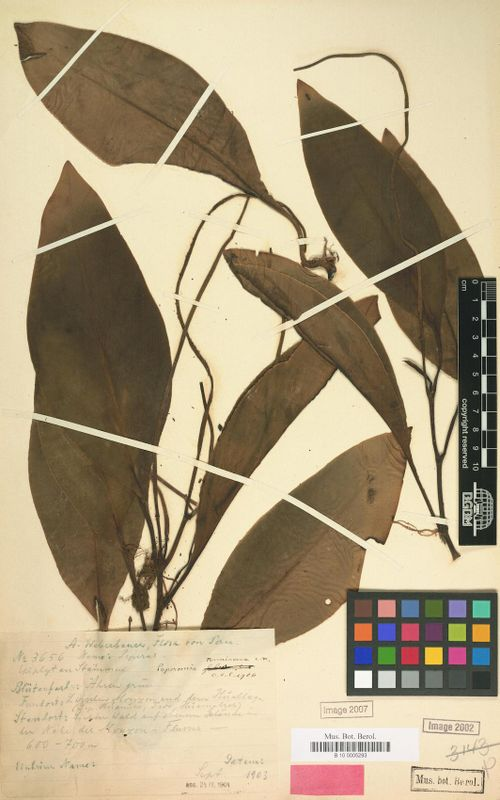

Scientific classification
- Kingdom: Plantae
- Clade: Tracheophytes
- Clade: Angiosperms
- Clade: Magnoliids
- Order: Piperales
- Family: Piperaceae
- Genus: Peperomia
- Species: P. tenuiramea

Binomial name
- Peperomia tenuiramea C.DC.

= Peperomia tenuiramea =

Species of epiphyte

Peperomia tenuiramea is a species of epiphyte in the genus Peperomia. Its Conservation Status is Not Threatened.

== Description ==
First specimens were collected at Huamalies, at the 600-700 metres elevation.

Its dry stems are about 3 millimetres thick. The leaves alternate. Dry, stiff limbs can measure up to 19 1/2 cm in length and 7 1/2 cm in width. petioles as large as three centimetres.

Glabrous, with long petioled lanceolate leaves, sending 6-7 thin veins on both sides of the central nerve beyond 1/2 its length; branches of spiciferis aphyllis with opposite leaves bearing spikes of 2-3 long lanceolate scales, peduncles much shorter than petioles, spikes slightly exceeding the limbs of densiflora; orbicular plate pedicellate in the centre; anthers elliptic with very short filaments; the ovary emerged above the scutellum, the oblong scutellum pointed at the tip, the stigma inserted below the middle of the scutellum, minute; berry elliptic, strewn with glands at the apex, and sat far down-curved.

== Taxonomy and naming ==
It was described in 1908 by Casimir de Candolle in "Botanische Jahrbücher für Systematik, Pflanzengeschichte und Pflanzengeographie.", from collected specimens by Augusto Weberbauer in 1903. It gets its name from Tenui + ramea, which means Thin branches.

== Distribution and habitat ==
It is endemic to Peru. It grows on epiphyte environment and is a herb. It grows at 650m ±50m elevation.
