= Downstream promoter element =

Overview of the four core promoter elements B recognition element (BRE), TATA box, initiator motif (Inr), and downstream promoter element (DPE), showing their respective consensus sequences and their distance from the transcription start site.

In molecular biology, a downstream promoter element (DPE) is a core promoter element. Like all core promoters, the DPE plays an important role in the initiation of gene transcription by RNA polymerase II. The DPE was first described by T. W. Burke and James T. Kadonaga in Drosophila melanogaster at the University of California, San Diego in 1996. It is also present in other species including humans, but not Saccharomyces cerevisiae.

Together with the initiator motif (Inr), another core promoter element, the DPE is recognized by the transcription factor II D (TFIID) subunits TAF6 and TAF9. It has been shown that DPE-dependent basal transcription depends highly on the Inr (and vice versa) and on correct spacing between the two elements.

The DPE consensus sequence was originally thought to be RGWCGTG, however more recent studies have suggested it to be the similar but more general sequence RGWYV(T). (Note: In nucleic acid notation for DNA, R (puRine) stands for A/G (adenine or guanine, which are both purines); W (Weak) stands for A/T (adenine or thymine, which both form only two hydrogen bonds); Y (pYrimidine) stands for C/T (cytosine or thymine, which are both pyrimidines); and V stands for A/C/G.) It is located about 28–33 nucleotides downstream of the transcription start site.

== Occurrence ==
It has been shown that the DPE is about as widely used as the TATA box in D. melanogaster. While a DPE was found in many promoters that do not contain a TATA box, there are also promoters that contain both a TATA box and a DPE.

The promoters of nearly all Hox genes of D. melanogaster, with the exception of the evolutionarily most recent genes, Ubx and Abd-A, contain a DPE motif and lack a TATA box. Drosophila promoters containing the DPE sequence include Abd-B, Antp P2, bride of sevenless, brown, caudal, E74, E75, engrailed, Gsα, labial, nmMHC, ras2, singed, stellate, and white. In organisms other than D. melanogaster, the promoter of the human and mouse IRF1 gene has been found to contain a DPE consensus sequence at the appropriate distance from the transcription start site. This promoter, too, does not contain a TATA box.

DPE has also been reported to play role in primitive Eukaryote Entamoeba histolytica.
