= TAF2 =

Protein-coding gene in the species Homo sapiens

Identifiers
- Aliases: TAF2, CIF150, MRT40, TAF2B, TAFII150, TATA-box binding protein associated factor 2
- External IDs: OMIM: 604912; MGI: 2443028; GeneCards: TAF2
Available structures
PDB	Ortholog search: PDBe RCSB
PDB	List of PDB id codes 5FUR

Gene location (Human)
Chr.	Chromosome 8 (human)
Band	8q24.12	Start	119,730,774 bp
Band	8q24.12	End	119,832,863 bp

Gene location (Mouse)
Chr.	Chromosome 15 (mouse)
Band	15|15 D1	Start	54,878,527 bp
Band	15|15 D1	End	54,935,548 bp
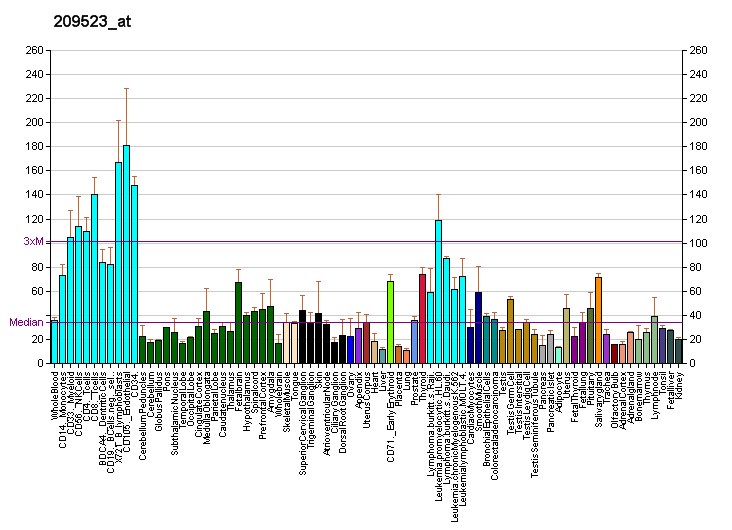
RNA expression pattern
Bgee	Human / Mouse (ortholog); Top expressed in: endothelial cell; Achilles tendon; corpus epididymis; tail of epididymis; Epithelium of choroid plexus; ventricular zone; caput epididymis; skin of hip; epithelium of nasopharynx; germinal epithelium / Top expressed in: hand; genital tubercle; tail of embryo; Gonadal ridge; superior cervical ganglion; spermatocyte; otolith organ; utricle; mandibular prominence; maxillary prominence; More reference expression data
BioGPS	More reference expression data
Gene ontology
Molecular function	sequence-specific DNA binding; chromatin binding; protein binding; TFIID-class transcription factor complex binding; RNA polymerase II general transcription initiation factor activity
Cellular component	transcription factor TFTC complex; transcription factor TFIID complex; nucleoplasm; nucleus
Biological process	regulation of transcription, DNA-templated; response to organic cyclic compound; transcription by RNA polymerase II; transcription, DNA-templated; G2/M transition of mitotic cell cycle; transcription initiation from RNA polymerase II promoter; positive regulation of transcription by RNA polymerase II; RNA polymerase II preinitiation complex assembly; regulation of signal transduction by p53 class mediator
Sources:Amigo / QuickGO
Orthologs
Databases	NCBI: entry; OMA: entry
Species	Human	Mouse
Entrez	6873	319944
Ensembl	ENSG00000064313	ENSMUSG00000037343
UniProt	Q6P1X5	Q8C176
RefSeq (mRNA)	NM_003184	NM_001081288; NM_177040
RefSeq (protein)	NP_003175	NP_001074757
Location (UCSC)	Chr 8: 119.73 – 119.83 Mb	Chr 15: 54.88 – 54.94 Mb
PubMed search
- Wikidata
View/Edit Human	View/Edit Mouse

Transcription initiation factor TFIID subunit 2 is a protein that in humans is encoded by the TAF2 gene.

Initiation of transcription by RNA polymerase II requires the activities of more than 70 polypeptides. The protein that coordinates these activities is transcription factor IID (TFIID), which binds to the core promoter to position the polymerase properly, serves as the scaffold for assembly of the remainder of the transcription complex, and acts as a channel for regulatory signals. TFIID is composed of the TATA binding protein (TBP) and a group of evolutionarily conserved proteins known as TBP-associated factors or TAFs. TAFs may participate in basal transcription, serve as coactivators, function in promoter recognition or modify general transcription factors (GTFs) to facilitate complex assembly and transcription initiation. This gene encodes one of the larger subunits of TFIID that is stably associated with the TFIID complex. It contributes to interactions at and downstream of the transcription initiation site, interactions that help determine transcription complex response to activators.
