= RPA4 =

Protein-coding gene in the species Homo sapiens

Identifiers
- Aliases: RPA4, HSU24186, replication protein A4
- External IDs: OMIM: 300767; GeneCards: RPA4

Gene location (Human)
Chr.	X chromosome (human)
Band	Xq21.33	Start	96,883,908 bp
Band	Xq21.33	End	96,885,467 bp
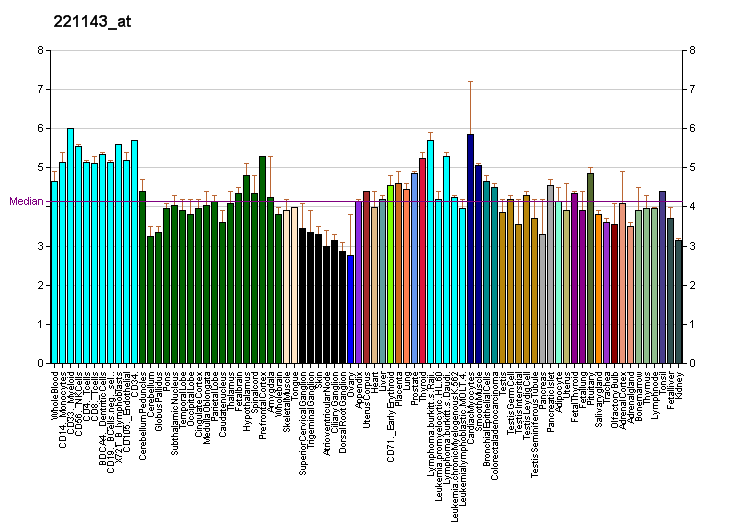
RNA expression pattern
Bgee	Human / Mouse (ortholog); Top expressed in: testicle; secondary oocyte; buccal mucosa cell; skin of hip; visceral pleura; parietal pleura; granulocyte; gonad; bone marrow; Achilles tendon / n/a; More reference expression data
BioGPS	More reference expression data
Gene ontology
Molecular function	single-stranded DNA binding; DNA binding; damaged DNA binding; double-stranded DNA binding; protein binding; sequence-specific DNA binding; G-rich strand telomeric DNA binding
Cellular component	DNA replication factor A complex; nucleus; nucleoplasm; telomere; chromatin; condensed nuclear chromosome; site of double-strand break
Biological process	nucleotide-excision repair; DNA damage checkpoint signaling; DNA replication; DNA recombination; DNA replication initiation; nuclear DNA replication; DNA repair; cellular response to DNA damage stimulus; G1/S transition of mitotic cell cycle; telomere maintenance via recombination; double-strand break repair via homologous recombination; DNA topological change; DNA unwinding involved in DNA replication; base-excision repair; DNA mismatch repair; mitotic recombination; telomere maintenance via telomerase; reciprocal meiotic recombination; heteroduplex formation; positive regulation of helicase activity; regulation of DNA damage checkpoint
Sources:Amigo / QuickGO
Orthologs
Databases	NCBI: entry; OMA: entry
Species	Human	Mouse
Entrez	29935	n/a
Ensembl	ENSG00000204086	n/a
UniProt	Q13156	n/a
RefSeq (mRNA)	NM_013347	n/a
RefSeq (protein)	NP_037479	n/a
Location (UCSC)	Chr X: 96.88 – 96.89 Mb	n/a
PubMed search		n/a
- Wikidata
View/Edit Human

Replication protein A 30 kDa subunit is a protein that in humans is encoded by the RPA4 gene.
