= TAF11 =

Protein-coding gene in the species Homo sapiens

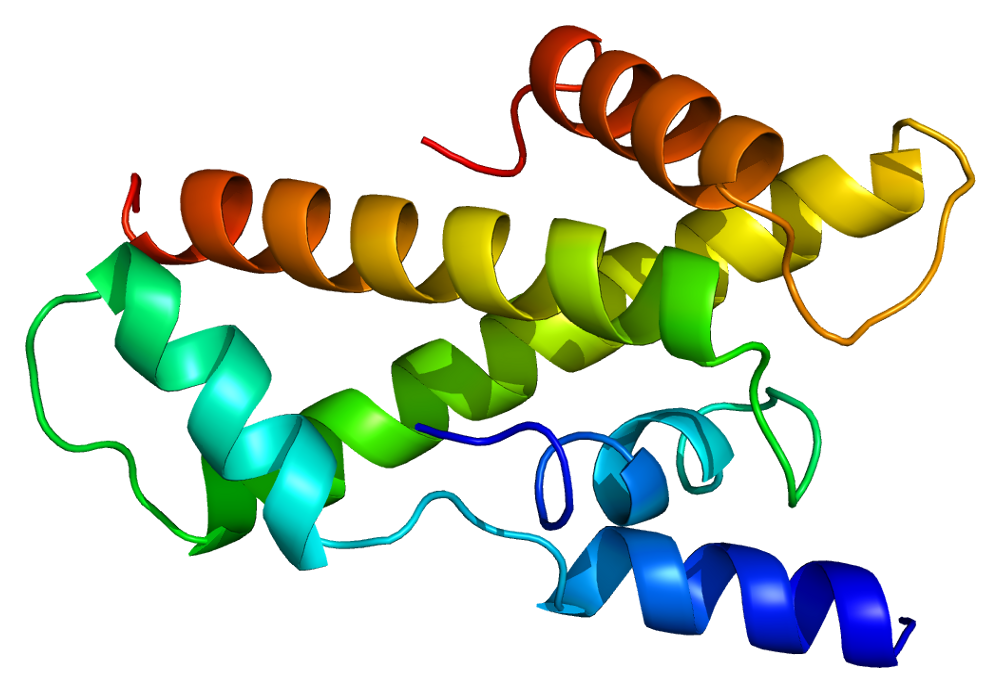

Identifiers
- Aliases: TAF11, MGC:15243, TAF2I, TAFII28, PRO2134, TATA-box binding protein associated factor 11
- External IDs: OMIM: 600772; MGI: 1916026; GeneCards: TAF11
Available structures
PDB	Ortholog search: PDBe RCSB
PDB	List of PDB id codes 1BH8, 1BH9

Gene location (Human)
Chr.	Chromosome 6 (human)
Band	6p21.31	Start	34,877,462 bp
Band	6p21.31	End	34,889,192 bp

Gene location (Mouse)
Chr.	Chromosome 17 (mouse)
Band	17|17 A3.3	Start	28,120,096 bp
Band	17|17 A3.3	End	28,128,818 bp
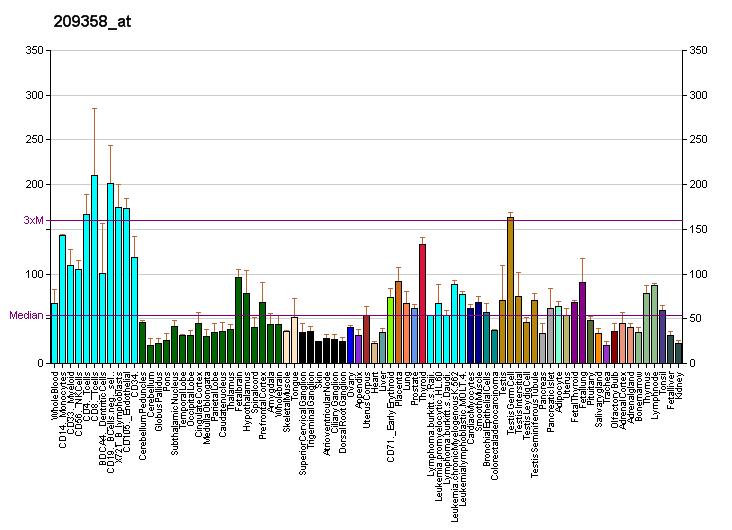
RNA expression pattern
Bgee	Human / Mouse (ortholog); Top expressed in: amniotic fluid; tibia; buccal mucosa cell; human penis; superior surface of tongue; palpebral conjunctiva; pylorus; lactiferous duct; urethra; parietal pleura / Top expressed in: ventricular zone; zygote; tail of embryo; embryo; embryo; Ileal epithelium; genital tubercle; yolk sac; granulocyte; secondary oocyte; More reference expression data
BioGPS	More reference expression data
Gene ontology
Molecular function	protein heterodimerization activity; transcription coactivator activity; protein binding; vitamin D receptor binding; protein N-terminus binding; thyroid hormone receptor binding; DNA binding; transcription factor binding
Cellular component	Golgi apparatus; transcription factor TFIID complex; nucleus; nucleoplasm
Biological process	RNA polymerase II preinitiation complex assembly; transcription initiation from RNA polymerase II promoter; regulation of transcription, DNA-templated; transcription by RNA polymerase II; positive regulation by host of viral transcription; transcription, DNA-templated; snRNA transcription by RNA polymerase II; regulation of signal transduction by p53 class mediator; positive regulation of nucleic acid-templated transcription
Sources:Amigo / QuickGO
Orthologs
Databases	NCBI: entry; OMA: entry
Species	Human	Mouse
Entrez	6882	68776
Ensembl	ENSG00000064995	ENSMUSG00000024218
UniProt	Q15544	Q99JX1
RefSeq (mRNA)	NM_001270488; NM_005643	NM_026836; NM_001379368
RefSeq (protein)	NP_001257417; NP_005634	NP_081112; NP_001366297
Location (UCSC)	Chr 6: 34.88 – 34.89 Mb	Chr 17: 28.12 – 28.13 Mb
PubMed search
- Wikidata
View/Edit Human	View/Edit Mouse

Transcription initiation factor TFIID subunit 11 also known as TAFII28, is a protein that in humans is encoded by the TAF11 gene.

== Function ==
Initiation of transcription by RNA polymerase II requires the activities of more than 70 polypeptides. The protein that coordinates these activities is transcription factor IID (TFIID), which binds to the core promoter to position the polymerase properly, serves as the scaffold for assembly of the remainder of the transcription complex, and acts as a channel for regulatory signals. TFIID is composed of the TATA-binding protein (TBP) and a group of evolutionarily conserved proteins known as TBP-associated factors or TAFs. TAFs may participate in basal transcription, serve as coactivators, function in promoter recognition or modify general transcription factors (GTFs) to facilitate complex assembly and transcription initiation. This gene encodes a small subunit of TFIID that is present in all TFIID complexes and interacts with TBP. This subunit also interacts with another small subunit, TAF13, to form a heterodimer with a structure similar to the histone core structure.

TAFII28
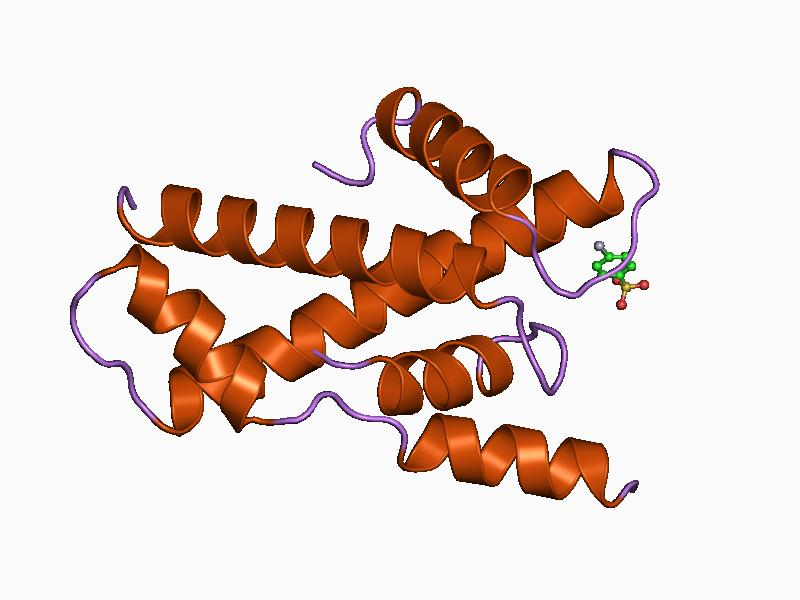
- htafii18/htafii28 heterodimer crystal structure with bound pcmbs

Identifiers
- Symbol: TAFII28
- Pfam: PF04719
- Pfam clan: CL0012
- InterPro: IPR006809
- SCOP2: 1bh9 / SCOPe / SUPFAM
Available protein structures:
- PDB: IPR006809 PF04719 (ECOD; PDBsum)
- AlphaFold: IPR006809; PF04719

In molecular biology, TAFII28 refers to the TATA box binding protein associated factor. Together with the TATA-binding protein and other TAFs it forms the general transcription factor, TFIID. They together participate in the assembly of the transcription preinitiation complex. The conserved region is found at the C terminus of most member proteins.

== Structure ==
The crystal structure of hTAFII28 with hTAFII18 shows that this region is involved in the binding of these two subunits. The conserved region contains four alpha helices and three loops arranged as in histone H3.

== Interactions ==
TAF11 has been shown to interact with:

- GTF2F1,
- POLR2A and
- TAF13,
- TAF15,
- TATA binding protein, and
- Transcription Factor II B.
