= TAF8 =

Protein-coding gene in the species Homo sapiens

Identifiers
- Aliases: TAF8, 43, II, TAF, TAFII-43, TAFII43, TBN, TATA-box binding protein associated factor 8, TAF(II)43
- External IDs: OMIM: 609514; MGI: 1926879; GeneCards: TAF8
Available structures
PDB	Ortholog search: PDBe RCSB
PDB	List of PDB id codes 4WV6, 5FUR

Gene location (Human)
Chr.	Chromosome 6 (human)
Band	6p21.1	Start	42,050,513 bp
Band	6p21.1	End	42,087,461 bp

Gene location (Mouse)
Chr.	Chromosome 17 (mouse)
Band	17|17 C	Start	47,794,289 bp
Band	17|17 C	End	47,813,217 bp
RNA expression pattern
Bgee	Human / Mouse (ortholog); Top expressed in: buccal mucosa cell; apex of heart; oocyte; monocyte; bone marrow cell; left ventricle; gastrocnemius muscle; muscle of thigh; tendon of biceps brachii; appendix / Top expressed in: granulocyte; secondary oocyte; thymus; zygote; yolk sac; neural layer of retina; ventricular zone; primary oocyte; tail of embryo; muscle of thigh; More reference expression data
BioGPS	n/a
Gene ontology
Molecular function	protein binding; protein heterodimerization activity
Cellular component	cytoplasm; perinuclear region of cytoplasm; nucleus; nucleoplasm; transcription factor TFIID complex
Biological process	positive regulation of transcription, DNA-templated; multicellular organism development; cell differentiation; regulation of transcription, DNA-templated; regulation of fat cell differentiation; transcription, DNA-templated; maintenance of protein location in nucleus; inner cell mass cell proliferation; snRNA transcription by RNA polymerase II
Sources:Amigo / QuickGO
Orthologs
Databases	NCBI: entry; OMA: entry
Species	Human	Mouse
Entrez	129685	63856
Ensembl	ENSG00000137413	ENSMUSG00000023980
UniProt	Q7Z7C8	Q9EQH4
RefSeq (mRNA)	NM_138572	NM_022015; NM_001356290
RefSeq (protein)	NP_612639	NP_071298; NP_001343219
Location (UCSC)	Chr 6: 42.05 – 42.09 Mb	Chr 17: 47.79 – 47.81 Mb
PubMed search
- Wikidata
View/Edit Human	View/Edit Mouse

Transcription initiation factor TFIID subunit 8 is a protein that in humans is encoded by the TAF8 gene.

This gene encodes one of several TATA-binding protein (TBP)-associated factors (TAFs), which are integral subunits of the general transcription factor complex TFIID. TFIID recognizes the core promoter of many genes and nucleates the assembly of a transcription preinitiation complex containing RNA polymerase II and other initiation factors. The protein encoded by this gene contains an H4-like histone fold domain, and interacts with several subunits of TFIID including TBP and the histone-fold protein TAF10. Alternatively spliced transcript variants have been described, but their biological validity has not been determined.

== Clinical significance ==
Mutations of the TAF8 gene cause a neurodegenerative disorder first described in 2022 and presenting as severe psychomotor retardation with almost absent development, feeding problems, microcephaly, growth retardation, spasticity and epilepsy.
