= TAF9B =

Protein-coding gene in the species Homo sapiens

Identifiers
- Aliases: TAF9B, DN-7, DN7, TAF9L, TAFII31L, TFIID-31, TATA-box binding protein associated factor 9b
- External IDs: OMIM: 300754; MGI: 3039562; HomoloGene: 47969; GeneCards: TAF9B; OMA:TAF9B - orthologs

Gene location (Human)
Chr.	X chromosome (human)
Band	Xq21.1	Start	78,129,748 bp
Band	Xq21.1	End	78,139,650 bp

Gene location (Mouse)
Chr.	X chromosome (mouse)
Band	X|X D	Start	105,250,489 bp
Band	X|X D	End	105,264,764 bp
RNA expression pattern
Bgee	Human / Mouse (ortholog); Top expressed in: gonad; saphenous vein; vena cava; ganglionic eminence; corpus callosum; endothelial cell; inferior ganglion of vagus nerve; ventricular zone; islet of Langerhans; middle temporal gyrus / Top expressed in: zygote; secondary oocyte; primary oocyte; arcuate nucleus; suprachiasmatic nucleus; median eminence; pineal gland; lateral septal nucleus; ventromedial nucleus; paraventricular nucleus of hypothalamus; More reference expression data
BioGPS	n/a
Gene ontology
Molecular function	protein heterodimerization activity; protein binding; transcription corepressor activity; histone acetyltransferase activity; transcription factor binding; thiol-dependent deubiquitinase; RNA polymerase II general transcription initiation factor activity
Cellular component	nucleus; transcription factor TFTC complex; nucleoplasm; transcription factor TFIID complex; SAGA complex
Biological process	protein stabilization; regulation of transcription, DNA-templated; positive regulation of cell growth; transcription, DNA-templated; transcription initiation from RNA polymerase II promoter; negative regulation of transcription by RNA polymerase II; negative regulation of intrinsic apoptotic signaling pathway in response to DNA damage by p53 class mediator; DNA-templated transcription, initiation; transcription by RNA polymerase II; negative regulation of apoptotic process; regulation of signal transduction by p53 class mediator; protein deubiquitination; histone H3 acetylation; positive regulation of transcription by RNA polymerase II; RNA polymerase II preinitiation complex assembly
Sources:Amigo / QuickGO
Orthologs
Species	Human	Mouse
Entrez	51616	407786
Ensembl	ENSG00000187325	ENSMUSG00000047242
UniProt	Q9HBM6	Q6NZA9
RefSeq (mRNA)	NM_015975	NM_001001176; NM_001167988
RefSeq (protein)	NP_057059	NP_001001176; NP_001161460
Location (UCSC)	Chr X: 78.13 – 78.14 Mb	Chr X: 105.25 – 105.26 Mb
PubMed search
- Wikidata
View/Edit Human	View/Edit Mouse

Transcription initiation factor TFIID subunit 9B is a protein that in humans is encoded by the TAF9B gene.

Initiation of transcription by RNA polymerase II requires the activities of more than 70 polypeptides. The protein that coordinates these activities is transcription factor IID (TFIID), which binds to the core promoter to position the polymerase properly, serves as the scaffold for assembly of the remainder of the transcription complex, and acts as a channel for regulatory signals. TFIID is composed of the TATA-binding protein (TBP) and a group of evolutionarily conserved proteins known as TBP-associated factors or TAFs. TAFs may participate in basal transcription, serve as coactivators, function in promoter recognition or modify general transcription factors (GTFs) to facilitate complex assembly and transcription initiation. This gene encodes a protein that is similar to one of the small subunits of TFIID, TBP-associated factor 9, and is also a subunit of TFIID. TAF9 and TAF9b share some functions but also have distinct roles in the transcriptional regulatory process.
