= TAF4 =

Protein-coding gene in the species Homo sapiens

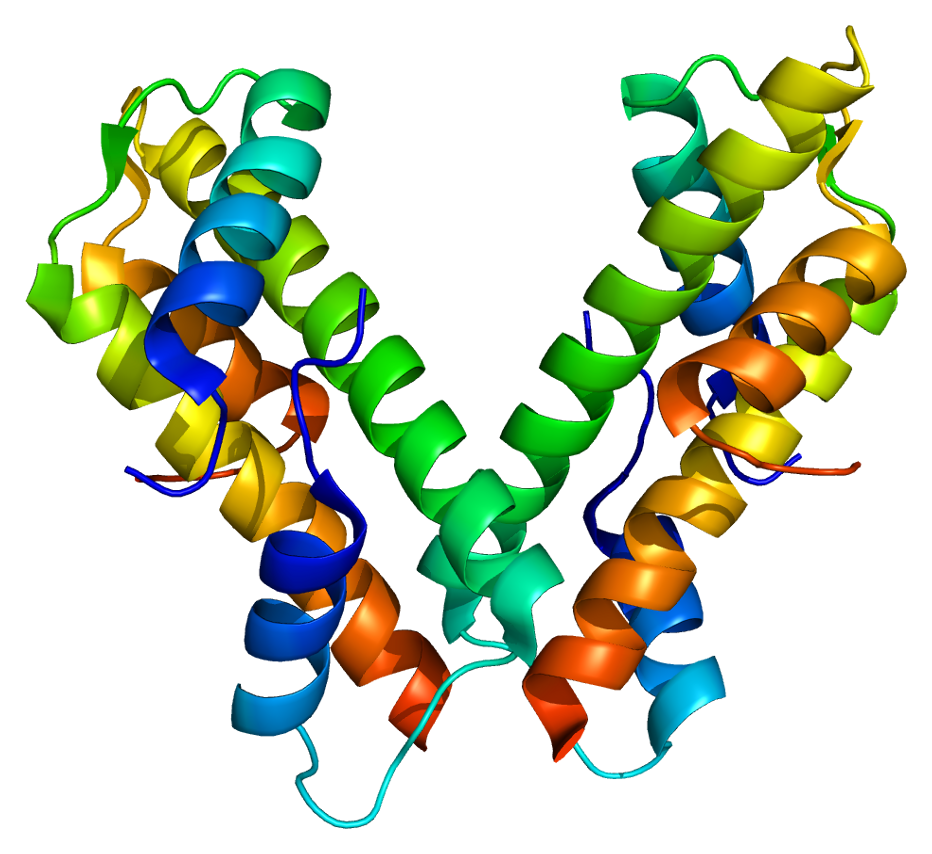

Identifiers
- Aliases: TAF4, TAF2C, TAF2C1, TAF4A, TAFII130, TAFII135, TATA-box binding protein associated factor 4, TAFII-135, TAFII-130, TAF(II)135, TAF(II)130
- External IDs: OMIM: 601796; MGI: 2152346; GeneCards: TAF4
Available structures
PDB	Ortholog search: PDBe RCSB
PDB	List of PDB id codes 1H3O, 2P6V

Gene location (Human)
Chr.	Chromosome 20 (human)
Band	20q13.33	Start	61,953,469 bp
Band	20q13.33	End	62,065,881 bp

Gene location (Mouse)
Chr.	Chromosome 2 (mouse)
Band	2|2 H4	Start	179,553,945 bp
Band	2|2 H4	End	179,618,439 bp
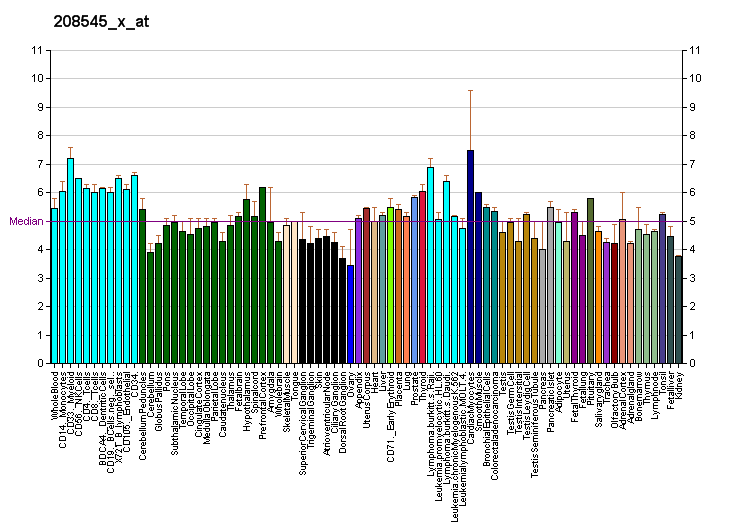

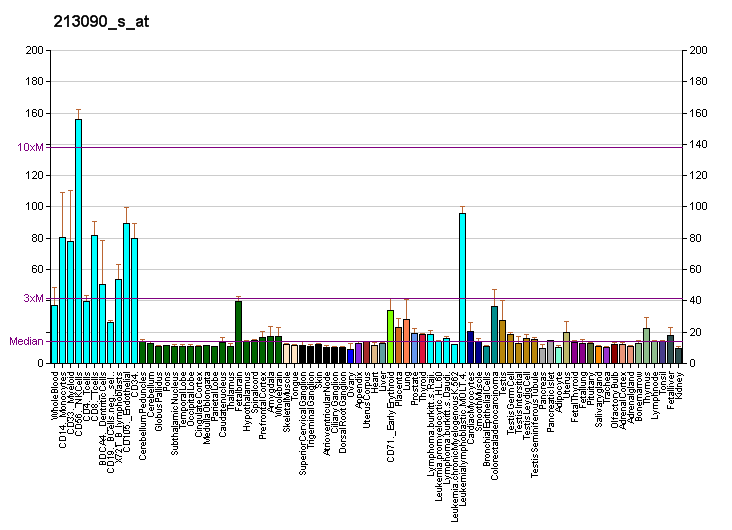
RNA expression pattern
Bgee	Human / Mouse (ortholog); Top expressed in: right testis; left testis; skeletal muscle tissue; bone marrow cell; ventricular zone; ovary; left ovary; ganglionic eminence; right ovary; right hemisphere of cerebellum / Top expressed in: secondary oocyte; zygote; primary oocyte; granulocyte; neural layer of retina; lobe of cerebellum; cerebellar vermis; human fetus; left lung lobe; epiblast; More reference expression data
BioGPS	More reference expression data
Gene ontology
Molecular function	DNA binding; DNA-binding transcription factor activity; transcription coactivator activity; protein binding; protein heterodimerization activity; aryl hydrocarbon receptor binding; transcription factor binding; RNA polymerase II general transcription initiation factor activity
Cellular component	transcription factor TFTC complex; transcription factor TFIID complex; nucleoplasm; MLL1 complex; nucleus; cytosol; protein-containing complex
Biological process	regulation of transcription, DNA-templated; regulation of transcription by RNA polymerase II; transcription by RNA polymerase II; transcription, DNA-templated; positive regulation of transcription, DNA-templated; DNA-templated transcription, initiation; ovarian follicle development; transcription initiation from RNA polymerase II promoter; regulation of signal transduction by p53 class mediator; viral process; positive regulation of transcription by RNA polymerase II; RNA polymerase II preinitiation complex assembly
Sources:Amigo / QuickGO
Orthologs
Databases	NCBI: entry; OMA: entry
Species	Human	Mouse
Entrez	6874	228980
Ensembl	ENSG00000130699	ENSMUSG00000039117
UniProt	O00268	E9QAP7
RefSeq (mRNA)	NM_003185	NM_001081092
RefSeq (protein)	NP_003176	NP_001074561
Location (UCSC)	Chr 20: 61.95 – 62.07 Mb	Chr 2: 179.55 – 179.62 Mb
PubMed search
- Wikidata
View/Edit Human	View/Edit Mouse

Transcription initiation factor TFIID subunit 4 is a protein that in humans is encoded by the TAF4 gene.

== Function ==
Initiation of transcription by RNA polymerase II requires the activities of more than 70 polypeptides. The protein that coordinates these activities is transcription factor IID (TFIID), which binds to the core promoter to position the polymerase properly, serves as the scaffold for assembly of the remainder of the transcription complex, and acts as a channel for regulatory signals. TFIID is composed of the TATA-binding protein (TBP) and a group of evolutionarily conserved proteins known as TBP-associated factors or TAFs. TAFs may participate in basal transcription, serve as coactivators, function in promoter recognition or modify general transcription factors (GTFs) to facilitate complex assembly and transcription initiation. This gene encodes one of the larger subunits of TFIID that has been shown to potentiate transcriptional activation by retinoic acid, thyroid hormone and vitamin D_{3} receptors. In addition, this subunit interacts with the transcription factor CREB, which has a glutamine-rich activation domain, and binds to other proteins containing glutamine-rich regions. Aberrant binding to this subunit by proteins with expanded polyglutamine regions has been suggested as one of the pathogenetic mechanisms underlying a group of neurodegenerative disorders referred to as polyglutamine diseases.

== Interactions ==
TAF4 has been shown to interact with:

- CBX5m
- TATA binding protein, and
- Transcription initiation protein SPT3 homolog.

== Protein domain ==
TAF4
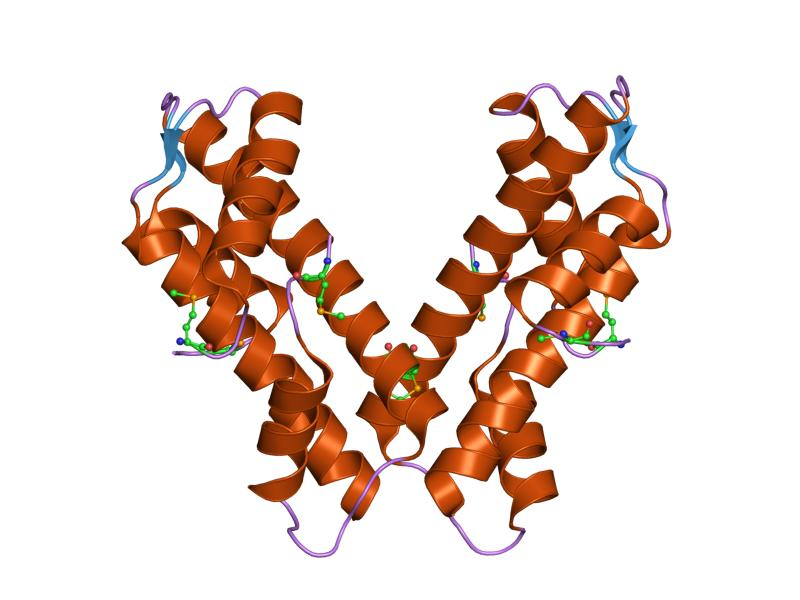
- crystal structure of the human taf4-taf12 (tafii135-tafii20) complex

Identifiers
- Symbol: TAF4
- Pfam: PF05236
- InterPro: IPR007900
- SCOP2: 1h3o / SCOPe / SUPFAM
Available protein structures:
- PDB: IPR007900 PF05236 (ECOD; PDBsum)
- AlphaFold: IPR007900; PF05236

Yeast TFIID comprises the TATA binding protein and 14 TBP-associated factors (TAFIIs), nine of which contain histone-fold domains (INTERPRO). The C-terminal region of the TFIID-specific yeast TAF4 (yTAF4) containing the HFD shares strong sequence similarity with Drosophila (d)TAF4 and human TAF4. A structure/function analysis of yTAF4 demonstrates that the HFD, a short conserved C-terminal domain (CCTD), and the region separating them are all required for yTAF4 function. This region of similarity is found in Transcription initiation factor TFIID component TAF4.
