= TAF1 =

Protein-coding gene in the species Homo sapiens

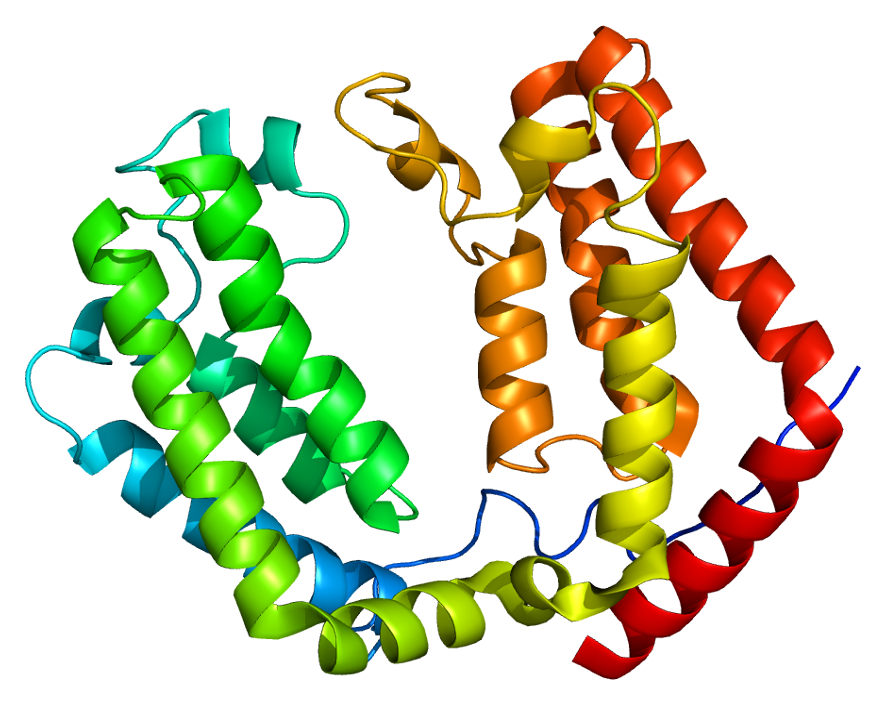

Identifiers
- Aliases: TAF1, BA2R, CCG1, CCGS, DYT3, DYT3/KAT4, N-NSCL2, OF, P250, TAF(II)250, TAF2A, TAFII-250, TAFII250, XDP, MRXS33, TATA-box binding protein associated factor 1
- External IDs: OMIM: 313650; MGI: 1336878; GeneCards: TAF1
Available structures
PDB	Ortholog search: PDBe RCSB
PDB	List of PDB id codes 1EQF, 3AAD, 3UV4, 3UV5, 4RGW, 4YYM, 4YYN, 5I29, 5I1Q, 5FUR
Enzyme activity
EC #	BRENDA	ExPASy	KEGG	MetaCyc
2.3.1.48	↗	↗	↗	↗
2.7.11.1	↗	↗	↗	↗

Gene location (Human)
Chr.	X chromosome (human)
Band	Xq13.1	Start	71,366,222 bp
Band	Xq13.1	End	71,532,374 bp

Gene location (Mouse)
Chr.	X chromosome (mouse)
Band	X D|X 44.29 cM	Start	100,576,340 bp
Band	X D|X 44.29 cM	End	100,645,395 bp
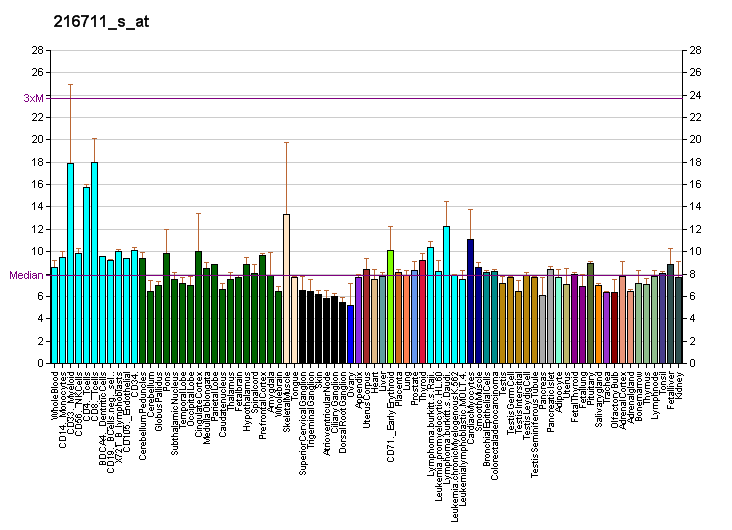
RNA expression pattern
Bgee	Human / Mouse (ortholog); Top expressed in: sural nerve; Achilles tendon; epithelium of colon; urethra; tonsil; left ovary; lactiferous duct; pericardium; corpus callosum; body of uterus / Top expressed in: hand; neural layer of retina; dentate gyrus of hippocampal formation granule cell; Gonadal ridge; Rostral migratory stream; ventricular zone; maxillary prominence; ventral tegmental area; tail of embryo; arcuate nucleus; More reference expression data
BioGPS	More reference expression data
Gene ontology
Molecular function	transferase activity; nucleotide binding; DNA binding; transcription coactivator activity; p53 binding; transcription factor binding; protein binding; lysine-acetylated histone binding; TBP-class protein binding; acyltransferase activity; ATP binding; protein serine/threonine kinase activity; histone acetyltransferase activity; kinase activity; protein heterodimerization activity; H3K27me3 modified histone binding; ubiquitin conjugating enzyme activity; acetyl-CoA binding; sequence-specific DNA binding; RNA polymerase II core promoter sequence-specific DNA binding; RNA polymerase II-specific DNA-binding transcription factor binding; DNA-binding transcription factor activity, RNA polymerase II-specific; RNA polymerase II general transcription initiation factor activity
Cellular component	nucleoplasm; MLL1 complex; nucleus; nucleolus; transcription regulator complex; transcription factor TFIID complex
Biological process	phosphorylation; RNA polymerase II preinitiation complex assembly; transcription by RNA polymerase II; positive regulation of transcription initiation from RNA polymerase II promoter; transcription, DNA-templated; peptidyl-serine phosphorylation; DNA-templated transcription, initiation; protein autophosphorylation; cell cycle; transcription initiation from RNA polymerase II promoter; peptidyl-threonine phosphorylation; positive regulation of proteasomal ubiquitin-dependent protein catabolic process; positive regulation of transcription by RNA polymerase II; regulation of signal transduction by p53 class mediator; viral process; histone acetylation; protein polyubiquitination; protein phosphorylation; cellular response to DNA damage stimulus; negative regulation of gene expression; midbrain development; positive regulation of protein binding; cellular response to UV; transcription factor catabolic process; protein stabilization; regulation of transcription initiation from RNA polymerase II promoter; cellular response to ATP; regulation of cell cycle G1/S phase transition; negative regulation of RNA polymerase II regulatory region sequence-specific DNA binding; negative regulation of protein autoubiquitination; negative regulation of ubiquitin-dependent protein catabolic process; positive regulation of androgen receptor activity; positive regulation of transcription by RNA polymerase I; regulation of transcription, DNA-templated; negative regulation of transcription from RNA polymerase II promoter in response to UV-induced DNA damage; negative regulation of DNA-binding transcription factor activity; ubiquitin-dependent protein catabolic process
Sources:Amigo / QuickGO
Orthologs
Databases	NCBI: entry; OMA: entry
Species	Human	Mouse
Entrez	6872	270627
Ensembl	ENSG00000147133	ENSMUSG00000031314
UniProt	P21675	Q80UV9
RefSeq (mRNA)	NM_001286074; NM_004606; NM_138923	NM_001081008; NM_001290729
RefSeq (protein)	NP_001273003; NP_004597; NP_620278	NP_001277658; NP_001392888; NP_001392889; NP_001392890; NP_001392891
Location (UCSC)	Chr X: 71.37 – 71.53 Mb	Chr X: 100.58 – 100.65 Mb
PubMed search
- Wikidata
View/Edit Human	View/Edit Mouse

Transcription initiation factor TFIID subunit 1, also known as transcription initiation factor TFIID 250 kDa subunit (TAFII-250) or TBP-associated factor 250 kDa (p250), is a protein that in humans is encoded by the TAF1 gene.

== Function ==
Initiation of transcription by RNA polymerase II requires the activities of more than 70 polypeptides. The protein that coordinates these activities is the basal transcription factor TFIID, which binds to the core promoter to position the polymerase properly, serves as the scaffold for assembly of the remainder of the transcription complex, and acts as a channel for regulatory signals. TFIID is composed of the TATA-binding protein (TBP) and a group of evolutionarily conserved proteins known as TBP-associated factors or TAFs. TAFs may participate in basal transcription, serve as coactivators, function in promoter recognition or modify general transcription factors (GTFs) to facilitate complex assembly and transcription initiation. This gene encodes the largest subunit of TFIID. This subunit binds to core promoter sequences encompassing the transcription start site. It also binds to activators and other transcriptional regulators, and these interactions affect the rate of transcription initiation. This subunit contains two independent protein kinase domains at the N and C-terminals, but also possesses acetyltransferase activity and can act as a ubiquitin-activating/conjugating enzyme. Two transcripts encoding different isoforms have been identified for this gene. Histones are often acetylated to open DNA for transcription. TAF1 contains two bromodomains, which each can bind one of two acetyllysine residues at position 5 and 12 in the H4 tail, to stabilize the TBP-TATA box complex.

== Clinical significance ==
A mutation in TAF1 was identified that contributes to a phenotype with severe intellectual disability (ID), a characteristic intergluteal crease, and distinctive facial features, including a broad, upturned nose, sagging cheeks, downward sloping palpebral fissures, prominent periorbital ridges, deep-set eyes, relative hypertelorism, thin upper lip, a high-arched palate, prominent ears with thickened helices, and a pointed chin. This is a non-synonymous change in TAF1 that results in an isoleucine (hydrophobic) to threonine (polar) change on the 1337th amino acid residue in the protein (NP_001273003.1). Two other mutations were reported in TAF1 in two families with intellectual disability, although further clinical details were not reported.

== Interactions ==
TAF1 has been shown to interact with:

- CSNK2A1,
- CCND1,
- GTF2F1,
- RB1,
- TAF7,
- TBP, and
- UBTF.

== See also ==
- Transcription factor II D
- Histone acetylation and deacetylation
