= Pribnow box =

DNA sequence required in bacterial promoters for transcription

The Pribnow box (also known as the Pribnow-Schaller box) is a sequence of TATAAT of six nucleotides (thymine, adenine, thymine, etc.) that is an essential part of a promoter site on DNA for transcription to occur in bacteria. It is an idealized or consensus sequence—that is, it shows the most frequently occurring base at each position in many promoters analyzed; individual promoters often vary from the consensus at one or more positions. It is also commonly called the -10 sequence or element, because it is centered roughly ten base pairs upstream from the site of initiation of transcription.

The Pribnow box has a function similar to the TATA box that occurs in promoters in eukaryotes and archaea: it is recognized and bound by a subunit of RNA polymerase during initiation of transcription. This region of the DNA is also the first place where base pairs separate during prokaryotic transcription to allow access to the template strand. The AT-richness is important to allow this separation, since adenine and thymine are easier to break apart (not only due to fewer hydrogen bonds, but also due to weaker base stacking effects).

It is named after David Pribnow and Heinz Schaller.

== Probability of occurrence of each nucleotide in E. coli ==
From Harley et al.:
T	A	T	A	A	T
82%	89%	52%	59%	49%	89%

== In fiction ==
The term "Pribnow box" is used in episode 13 of Neon Genesis Evangelion, in reference to the chamber holding simulation Evangelions for testing purposes.

== See also ==
- TATA box
