= TAF3 =

Protein-coding gene in the species Homo sapiens

Identifiers
- Aliases: TAF3, TAF140, TAFII-140, TAFII140, TATA-box binding protein associated factor 3
- External IDs: OMIM: 606576; MGI: 2388097; GeneCards: TAF3
Available structures
PDB	Ortholog search: PDBe RCSB
PDB	List of PDB id codes 5C13

Gene location (Human)
Chr.	Chromosome 10 (human)
Band	10p14	Start	7,818,497 bp
Band	10p14	End	8,016,631 bp

Gene location (Mouse)
Chr.	Chromosome 2 (mouse)
Band	2|2 A1	Start	9,919,363 bp
Band	2|2 A1	End	10,053,407 bp
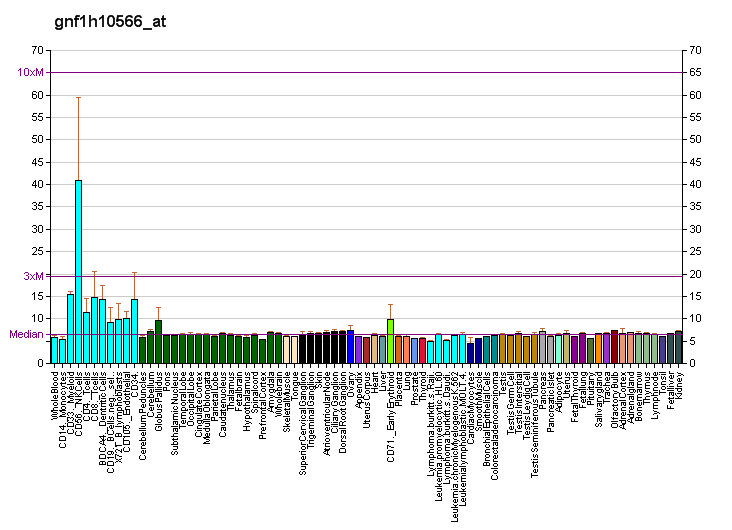

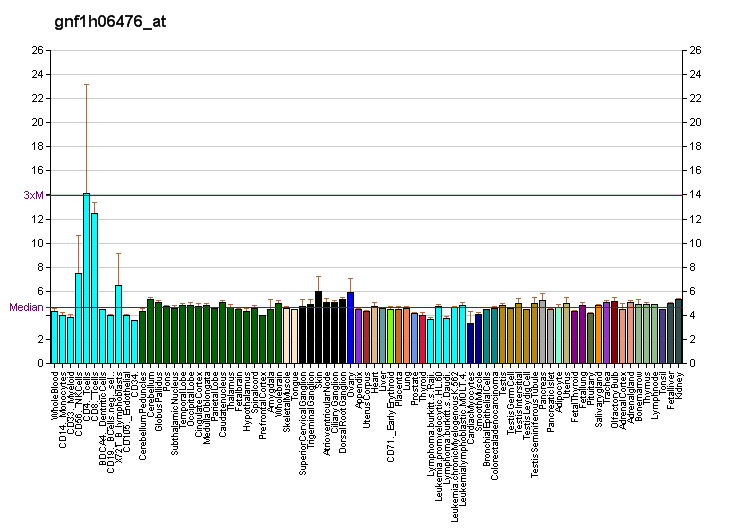

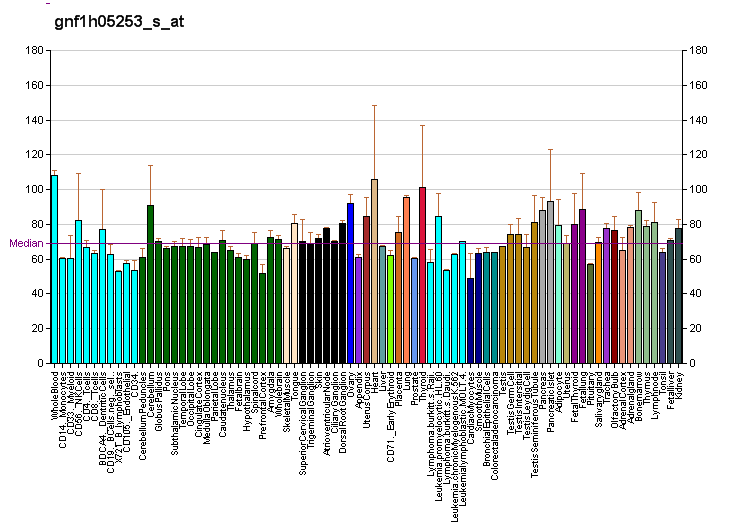
RNA expression pattern
Bgee	Human / Mouse (ortholog); Top expressed in: tendon of biceps brachii; vena cava; oocyte; cardia; sural nerve; secondary oocyte; internal globus pallidus; pylorus; pericardium; ventral tegmental area / Top expressed in: zygote; primary oocyte; secondary oocyte; genital tubercle; otolith organ; utricle; tail of embryo; substantia nigra; hand; retinal pigment epithelium; More reference expression data
BioGPS	More reference expression data
Gene ontology
Molecular function	p53 binding; protein binding; metal ion binding; protein heterodimerization activity
Cellular component	nucleus; nucleoplasm; nuclear membrane; transcription factor TFIID complex
Biological process	transcription initiation from RNA polymerase II promoter; regulation of transcription, DNA-templated; negative regulation of transcription by RNA polymerase II; transcription by RNA polymerase II; negative regulation of DNA-binding transcription factor activity; maintenance of protein location in nucleus; transcription, DNA-templated; regulation of signal transduction by p53 class mediator
Sources:Amigo / QuickGO
Orthologs
Databases	NCBI: entry; OMA: entry
Species	Human	Mouse
Entrez	83860	209361
Ensembl	ENSG00000165632	ENSMUSG00000025782
UniProt	Q5VWG9	Q5HZG4
RefSeq (mRNA)	NM_031923	NM_027748
RefSeq (protein)	NP_114129	NP_082024
Location (UCSC)	Chr 10: 7.82 – 8.02 Mb	Chr 2: 9.92 – 10.05 Mb
PubMed search
- Wikidata
View/Edit Human	View/Edit Mouse

Transcription initiation factor TFIID subunit 3 is a protein that in humans is encoded by the TAF3 gene.
