= TAF13 =

Protein-coding gene in humans

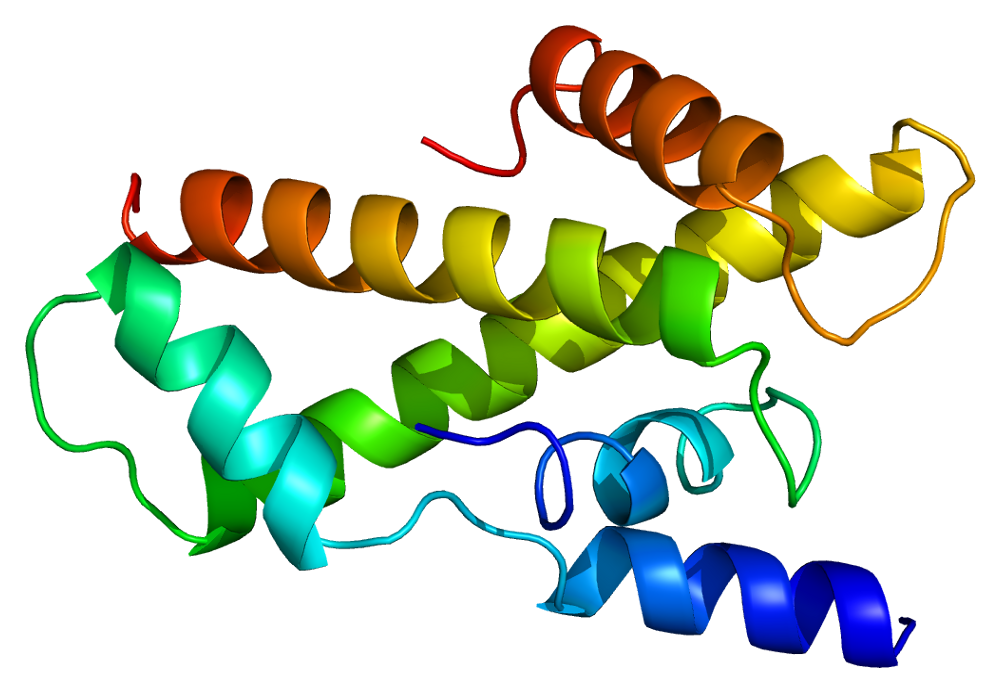

Identifiers
- Aliases: TAF13, TAF(II)18, TAF2K, TAFII-18, TAFII18, TATA-box binding protein associated factor 13, MRT60
- External IDs: OMIM: 600774; MGI: 1913500; GeneCards: TAF13
Available structures
PDB	Ortholog search: PDBe RCSB
PDB	List of PDB id codes 1BH8, 1BH9

Gene location (Human)
Chr.	Chromosome 1 (human)
Band	1p13.3	Start	109,062,496 bp
Band	1p13.3	End	109,076,012 bp

Gene location (Mouse)
Chr.	Chromosome 3 (mouse)
Band	3|3 F3	Start	108,479,014 bp
Band	3|3 F3	End	108,490,538 bp
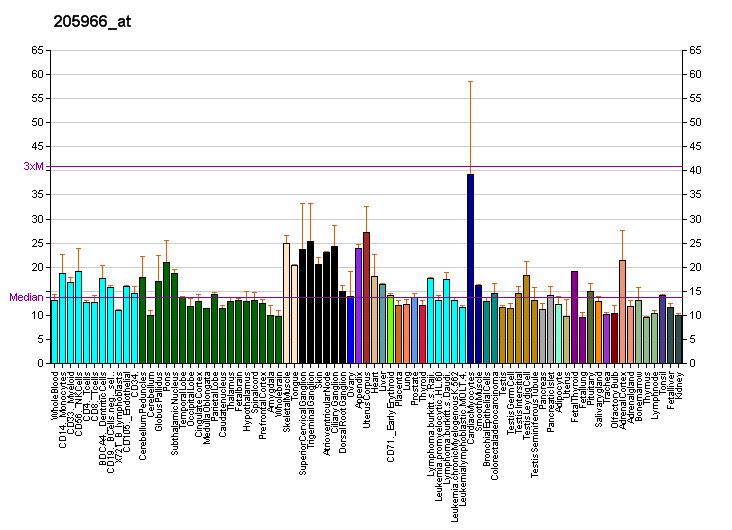
RNA expression pattern
Bgee	Human / Mouse (ortholog); Top expressed in: internal globus pallidus; lateral nuclear group of thalamus; gingival epithelium; Brodmann area 23; amniotic fluid; pars reticulata; endothelial cell; pons; subthalamic nucleus; pars compacta / Top expressed in: zygote; secondary oocyte; primary oocyte; zone of skin; layer of retina; neural layer of retina; quadriceps femoris muscle; morula; ventricular zone; spermatid; More reference expression data
BioGPS	More reference expression data
Gene ontology
Molecular function	DNA-binding transcription factor activity; protein C-terminus binding; protein binding; protein heterodimerization activity; DNA binding; transcription coregulator activity
Cellular component	nucleolus; transcription factor TFIID complex; nucleus; nucleoplasm
Biological process	transcription initiation from RNA polymerase II promoter; regulation of transcription, DNA-templated; transcription by RNA polymerase II; transcription, DNA-templated; DNA-templated transcription, initiation; snRNA transcription by RNA polymerase II; regulation of signal transduction by p53 class mediator; regulation of transcription by RNA polymerase II
Sources:Amigo / QuickGO
Orthologs
Databases	NCBI: entry; OMA: entry
Species	Human	Mouse
Entrez	6884	99730
Ensembl	ENSG00000197780	ENSMUSG00000048100
UniProt	Q15543	P61216
RefSeq (mRNA)	NM_005645	NM_025444
RefSeq (protein)	NP_005636	NP_079720
Location (UCSC)	Chr 1: 109.06 – 109.08 Mb	Chr 3: 108.48 – 108.49 Mb
PubMed search
- Wikidata
View/Edit Human	View/Edit Mouse

Transcription initiation factor TFIID subunit 13 is a protein that in humans is encoded by the TAF13 gene.

== Function ==
Initiation of transcription by RNA polymerase II requires the activities of more than 70 polypeptides. The protein that coordinates these activities is transcription factor IID (TFIID), which binds to the core promoter to position the polymerase properly, serves as the scaffold for assembly of the remainder of the transcription complex, and acts as a channel for regulatory signals. TFIID is composed of the TATA-binding protein (TBP) and a group of evolutionarily conserved proteins known as TBP-associated factors or TAFs. TAFs may participate in basal transcription, serve as coactivators, function in promoter recognition or modify general transcription factors (GTFs) to facilitate complex assembly and transcription initiation. This gene encodes a small subunit associated with a subset of TFIID complexes. This subunit interacts with TBP and with two other small subunits of TFIID, TAF10 and TAF11. There is a pseudogene located on chromosome 6.

== Interactions ==
TAF13 has been shown to interact with TAF15, TAF11, TAF10 and TATA binding protein.
