= TAF4B =

Protein-coding gene in the species Homo sapiens

Available structures
PDB	Ortholog search: PDBe RCSB
PDB	List of PDB id codes 1H3O, 2P6V

Identifiers
- Aliases: TAF4B, SPGF13, TAF2C2, TAFII105, TATA-box binding protein associated factor 4b
- External IDs: OMIM: 601689; MGI: 2152345; HomoloGene: 28266; GeneCards: TAF4B; OMA:TAF4B - orthologs

Gene location (Human)
Chr.	Chromosome 18 (human)
Band	18q11.2	Start	26,226,445 bp
Band	18q11.2	End	26,391,685 bp

Gene location (Mouse)
Chr.	Chromosome 18 (mouse)
Band	18|18 A1	Start	14,916,302 bp
Band	18|18 A1	End	15,033,416 bp
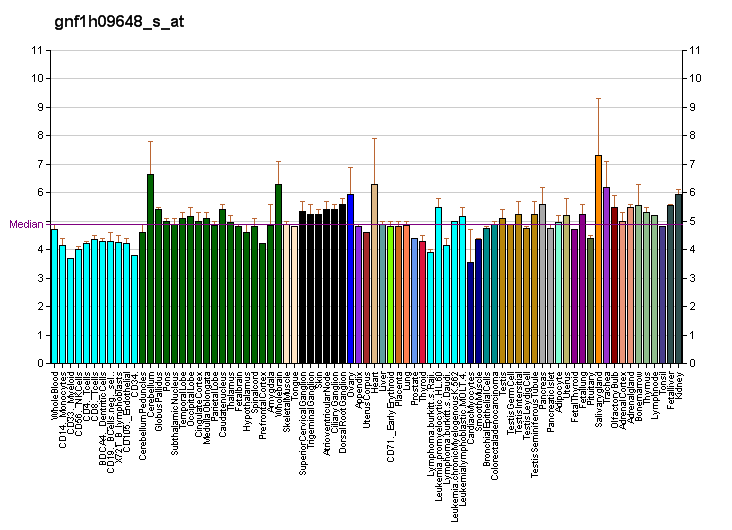
RNA expression pattern
Bgee	Human / Mouse (ortholog); Top expressed in: secondary oocyte; buccal mucosa cell; gonad; testicle; Brodmann area 23; endothelial cell; middle temporal gyrus; cartilage tissue; Achilles tendon; tibialis anterior muscle / Top expressed in: Epithelium of choroid plexus; lumbar spinal ganglion; hand; Gonadal ridge; otolith organ; utricle; Paneth cell; cumulus cell; oocyte; secondary oocyte; More reference expression data
BioGPS	More reference expression data
Gene ontology
Molecular function	DNA-binding transcription factor activity; DNA binding; NF-kappaB binding; protein heterodimerization activity; transcription coactivator activity; transcription factor binding; RNA polymerase II general transcription initiation factor activity
Cellular component	cytoplasm; nucleus; nucleoplasm; fibrillar center; transcription factor TFIID complex
Biological process	DNA-templated transcription, initiation; cell differentiation; transcription initiation from RNA polymerase II promoter; regulation of transcription, DNA-templated; transcription by RNA polymerase II; spermatogenesis; transcription, DNA-templated; oogenesis; regulation of signal transduction by p53 class mediator; positive regulation of transcription by RNA polymerase II; RNA polymerase II preinitiation complex assembly
Sources:Amigo / QuickGO
Orthologs
Species	Human	Mouse
Entrez	6875	72504
Ensembl	ENSG00000141384	ENSMUSG00000054321
UniProt	Q92750	G5E8Z2
RefSeq (mRNA)	NM_001293725; NM_005640	NM_001100449; NM_001369357; NM_001369358
RefSeq (protein)	NP_001280654; NP_005631	NP_001093919; NP_001356286; NP_001356287
Location (UCSC)	Chr 18: 26.23 – 26.39 Mb	Chr 18: 14.92 – 15.03 Mb
PubMed search
- Wikidata
View/Edit Human	View/Edit Mouse

Transcription initiation factor TFIID subunit 4B is a protein that in humans is encoded by the TAF4B gene.

== Function ==
TATA-binding protein associated factors (TAFs) participate, with TATA binding protein (TBP; MIM 600075), in the formation of the TFIID protein complex (see MIM 313650), which is involved in the initiation of gene transcription by RNA polymerase II (see MIM 180660).[supplied by OMIM]

== Interactions ==
TAF4B has been shown to interact with RELA.
