= TAF5 =

Protein-coding gene in the species Homo sapiens

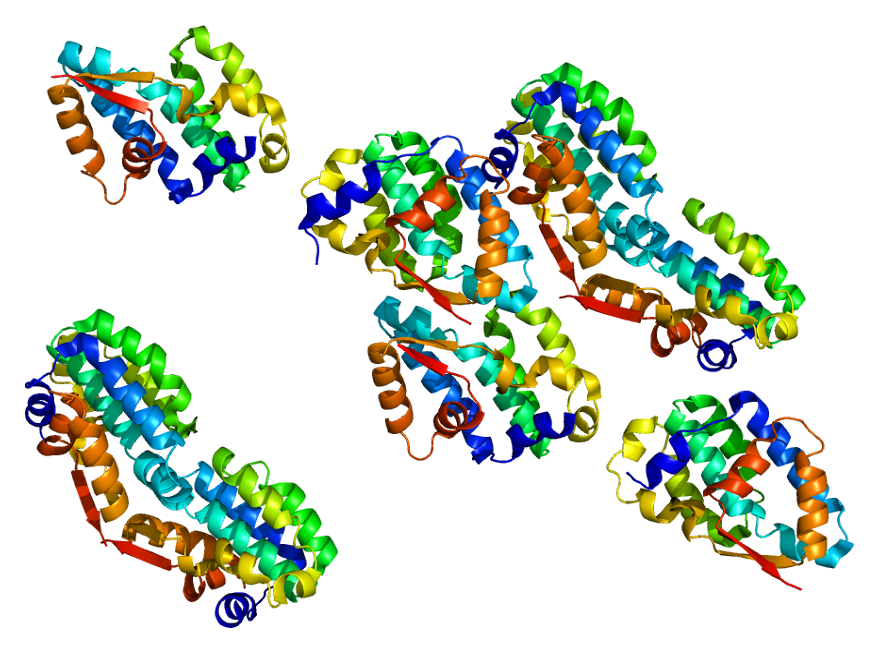

Identifiers
- Aliases: TAF5, TAF2D, TAFII100, TAF(II)100, TAFII-100, TATA-box binding protein associated factor 5
- External IDs: OMIM: 601787; MGI: 2442144; GeneCards: TAF5
Available structures
PDB	Ortholog search: PDBe RCSB
PDB	List of PDB id codes 2NXP

Gene location (Human)
Chr.	Chromosome 10 (human)
Band	10q24.33	Start	103,367,966 bp
Band	10q24.33	End	103,389,065 bp

Gene location (Mouse)
Chr.	Chromosome 19 (mouse)
Band	19|19 C3	Start	47,056,185 bp
Band	19|19 C3	End	47,071,918 bp
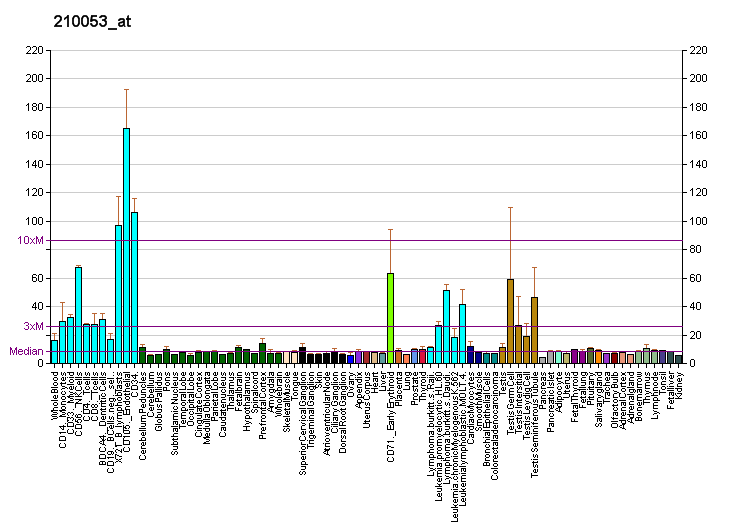
RNA expression pattern
Bgee	Human / Mouse (ortholog); Top expressed in: secondary oocyte; gonad; testicle; amniotic fluid; ventricular zone; embryo; buccal mucosa cell; ganglionic eminence; Brodmann area 23; middle temporal gyrus / Top expressed in: zygote; secondary oocyte; primary oocyte; medial ganglionic eminence; hand; primitive streak; tail of embryo; Paneth cell; spermatid; cumulus cell; More reference expression data
BioGPS	More reference expression data
Gene ontology
Molecular function	protein dimerization activity; DNA-binding transcription factor activity; histone acetyltransferase activity; protein binding; identical protein binding; RNA polymerase II general transcription initiation factor activity
Cellular component	nucleolus; actin cytoskeleton; nucleus; transcription factor TFTC complex; transcription factor TFIID complex; nucleoplasm
Biological process	transcription, DNA-templated; DNA-templated transcription, initiation; regulation of transcription, DNA-templated; transcription by RNA polymerase II; transcription initiation from RNA polymerase II promoter; snRNA transcription by RNA polymerase II; regulation of signal transduction by p53 class mediator; histone acetylation; viral process; chromatin organization
Sources:Amigo / QuickGO
Orthologs
Databases	NCBI: entry; OMA: entry
Species	Human	Mouse
Entrez	6877	226182
Ensembl	ENSG00000148835	ENSMUSG00000025049
UniProt	Q15542	Q8C092
RefSeq (mRNA)	NM_006951; NM_139052	NM_177342
RefSeq (protein)	NP_008882; NP_620640	NP_796316
Location (UCSC)	Chr 10: 103.37 – 103.39 Mb	Chr 19: 47.06 – 47.07 Mb
PubMed search
- Wikidata
View/Edit Human	View/Edit Mouse

Transcription initiation factor TFIID subunit 5 is a protein that in humans is encoded by the TAF5 gene.

== Function ==
Initiation of transcription by RNA polymerase II requires the activities of more than 70 polypeptides. The protein that coordinates these activities is transcription factor IID (TFIID), which binds to the core promoter to position the polymerase properly, serves as the scaffold for assembly of the remainder of the transcription complex, and acts as a channel for regulatory signals. TFIID is composed of the TATA-binding protein (TBP) and a group of evolutionarily conserved proteins known as TBP-associated factors or TAFs. TAFs may participate in basal transcription, serve as coactivators, function in promoter recognition or modify general transcription factors (GTFs) to facilitate complex assembly and transcription initiation. This gene encodes an integral subunit of TFIID associated with all transcriptionally competent forms of that complex. This subunit interacts strongly with two TFIID subunits that show similarity to histones H3 and H4, and it may participate in forming a nucleosome-like core in the TFIID complex.

== Interactions ==
TAF5 has been shown to interact with:

- TAF6,
- TAF9, and
- TAF15,
- TATA binding protein.
