= TAF15 =

Protein-coding gene in the species Homo sapiens

Identifiers
- Aliases: TAF15, Npl3, RBP56, TAF2N, TAFII68, TATA-box binding protein associated factor 15
- External IDs: OMIM: 601574; MGI: 1917689; GeneCards: TAF15
Available structures
PDB	Human UniProt search: PDBe RCSB
PDB	List of PDB id codes 2MMY

Gene location (Human)
Chr.	Chromosome 17 (human)
Band	17q12	Start	35,809,482 bp
Band	17q12	End	35,864,615 bp

Gene location (Mouse)
Chr.	Chromosome 11 (mouse)
Band	11|11 C	Start	83,473,086 bp
Band	11|11 C	End	83,506,743 bp
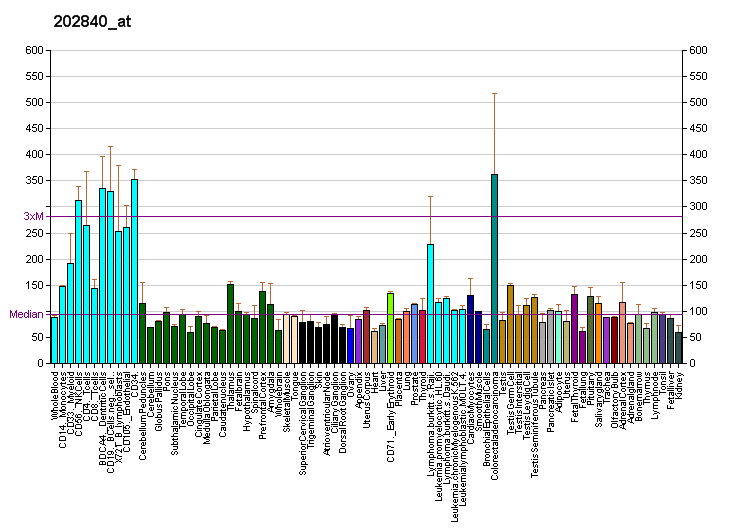
RNA expression pattern
Bgee	Human / Mouse (ortholog); Top expressed in: endometrium; ganglionic eminence; right testis; left testis; monocyte; lymph node; zone of skin; skin of abdomen; skin of leg; gastric mucosa / Top expressed in: neural layer of retina; tail of embryo; ventricular zone; yolk sac; genital tubercle; aortic valve; dentate gyrus of hippocampal formation granule cell; ascending aorta; esophagus; granulocyte; More reference expression data
BioGPS	More reference expression data
Gene ontology
Molecular function	DNA binding; protein binding; metal ion binding; nucleic acid binding; RNA binding
Cellular component	cytoplasm; nucleolus; nucleus; nucleoplasm
Biological process	positive regulation of transcription, DNA-templated; regulation of transcription, DNA-templated; transcription by RNA polymerase II; transcription initiation from RNA polymerase II promoter; regulation of signal transduction by p53 class mediator
Sources:Amigo / QuickGO
Orthologs
Databases	NCBI: entry; OMA: entry
Species	Human	Mouse
Entrez	8148	70439
Ensembl	ENSG00000270647; ENSG00000276833	ENSMUSG00000020680
UniProt	Q92804	n/a
RefSeq (mRNA)	NM_003487; NM_139215	NM_027427
RefSeq (protein)	NP_003478; NP_631961	n/a
Location (UCSC)	Chr 17: 35.81 – 35.86 Mb	Chr 11: 83.47 – 83.51 Mb
PubMed search
- Wikidata
View/Edit Human	View/Edit Mouse

TATA-binding protein-associated factor 2N is a protein that in humans is encoded by the TAF15 gene.

== Function ==
Initiation of transcription by RNA polymerase II requires the activities of more than 70 polypeptides. The protein that coordinates these activities is transcription factor IID (TFIID), which binds to the core promoter to position the polymerase properly, serves as the scaffold for assembly of the remainder of the transcription complex, and acts as a channel for regulatory signals. TFIID is composed of the TATA-binding protein (TBP) and a group of evolutionarily conserved proteins known as TBP-associated factors or TAFs. TAFs may participate in basal transcription, serve as coactivators, function in promoter recognition or modify general transcription factors (GTFs) to facilitate complex assembly and transcription initiation. This gene encodes a subunit of TFIID present in a subset of TFIID complexes. Translocations involving chromosome 17 and chromosome 9, where the gene for the nuclear receptor CSMF is located, result in a gene fusion product that is an RNA binding protein associated with a subset of extraskeletal myxoid chondrosarcomas. Two transcripts encoding different isoforms have been identified.

== Interactions ==
TAF15 has been shown to interact with:

- POLR2C,
- POLR2E,
- POLR2G,
- SAFB,
- TAF11,
- TAF13,
- TAF5,
- TAF7, and
- TATA binding protein
