= TAF6 =

Protein-coding gene in the species Homo sapiens

Identifiers
- Aliases: TAF6, MGC:8964, TAF(II)70, TAF(II)80, TAF2E, TAFII-70, TAFII-80, TAFII70, TAFII80, TAFII85, TATA-box binding protein associated factor 6, ALYUS
- External IDs: OMIM: 602955; MGI: 109129; GeneCards: TAF6
Available structures
PDB	Ortholog search: PDBe RCSB
PDB	List of PDB id codes 5FUR

Gene location (Human)
Chr.	Chromosome 7 (human)
Band	7q22.1	Start	100,106,876 bp
Band	7q22.1	End	100,119,841 bp

Gene location (Mouse)
Chr.	Chromosome 5 (mouse)
Band	5|5 G2	Start	138,176,879 bp
Band	5|5 G2	End	138,185,713 bp
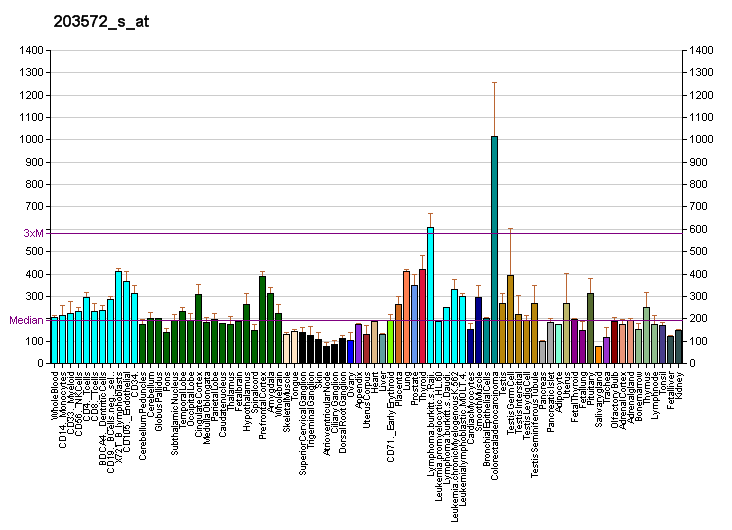
RNA expression pattern
Bgee	Human / Mouse (ortholog); Top expressed in: stromal cell of endometrium; right hemisphere of cerebellum; right frontal lobe; body of uterus; pituitary gland; anterior pituitary; canal of the cervix; right ovary; cingulate gyrus; anterior cingulate cortex / Top expressed in: genital tubercle; tail of embryo; ventricular zone; yolk sac; muscle of thigh; neural layer of retina; right kidney; neural tube; internal carotid artery; spermatid; More reference expression data
BioGPS	More reference expression data
Gene ontology
Molecular function	DNA-binding transcription factor activity; DNA binding; protein binding; protein heterodimerization activity; aryl hydrocarbon receptor binding
Cellular component	MLL1 complex; transcription factor TFTC complex; cytosol; nucleus; nucleoplasm; SAGA complex; transcription factor TFIID complex; SLIK (SAGA-like) complex; protein-containing complex
Biological process	negative regulation of cell cycle; transcription initiation from RNA polymerase II promoter; transcription by RNA polymerase II; regulation of DNA-binding transcription factor activity; transcription, DNA-templated; DNA-templated transcription, initiation; negative regulation of cell population proliferation; regulation of transcription, DNA-templated; snRNA transcription by RNA polymerase II; regulation of signal transduction by p53 class mediator; chromatin organization; RNA polymerase II preinitiation complex assembly; regulation of transcription by RNA polymerase II; apoptotic process
Sources:Amigo / QuickGO
Orthologs
Databases	NCBI: entry; OMA: entry
Species	Human	Mouse
Entrez	6878	21343
Ensembl	ENSG00000106290	ENSMUSG00000036980
UniProt	P49848	Q62311
RefSeq (mRNA)	NM_001190415; NM_005641; NM_139122; NM_139123; NM_139315 NM_001364998; NM_001364999; NM_001365000; NM_001365001; NM_001365002; NM_001365003; NM_001365004	NM_009315; NM_001356600; NM_001356601; NM_001356602
RefSeq (protein)	NP_001177344; NP_005632; NP_647476; NP_001351927; NP_001351928 NP_001351929; NP_001351930; NP_001351931; NP_001351932; NP_001351933	NP_033341; NP_001343529; NP_001343530; NP_001343531
Location (UCSC)	Chr 7: 100.11 – 100.12 Mb	Chr 5: 138.18 – 138.19 Mb
PubMed search
- Wikidata
View/Edit Human	View/Edit Mouse

Transcription initiation factor TFIID subunit 6 is a protein that in humans is encoded by the TAF6 gene.

== Function ==
Initiation of transcription by RNA polymerase II requires the activities of more than 70 polypeptides. The protein that coordinates these activities is transcription factor IID (TFIID), which binds to the core promoter to position the polymerase properly, serves as the scaffold for assembly of the remainder of the transcription complex, and acts as a channel for regulatory signals. TFIID is composed of the TATA-binding protein (TBP) and a group of evolutionarily conserved proteins known as TBP-associated factors or TAFs. TAFs may participate in basal transcription, serve as coactivators, function in promoter recognition or modify general transcription factors (GTFs) to facilitate complex assembly and transcription initiation. This gene encodes one of the smaller subunits of TFIID that binds weakly to TBP but strongly to TAF1, the largest subunit of TFIID. Four isoforms have been identified but complete transcripts have been determined for only three isoforms. One of the isoforms has been shown to preclude binding of one of the other TFIID subunits, thereby reducing transcription and initiating signals that trigger apoptosis.

== Interactions ==
TAF6 has been shown to interact with:

- TAF5 and
- TATA binding protein.
