= Scutellum (botany) =

Term used in the morphology of grasses

The scutellum is part of the structure of a barley and rice seed—the modified seed leaf.

The scutellum (from the Latin scutella meaning "small shield") can also refer to the equivalence of a thin cotyledon in monocots (especially members of the grass family). It is very thin with high surface area, and serves to absorb nutrients from the endosperm during germination.

The scutellum is believed to contain an as yet unidentified protein transporter that facilitates starch movement from the endosperm to the embryo.
