= TAF7 =

Protein-coding gene in the species Homo sapiens

Identifiers
- Aliases: TAF7, TAF2F, TAFII55, TATA-box binding protein associated factor 7
- External IDs: OMIM: 600573; MGI: 1346348; GeneCards: TAF7
Available structures
PDB	Ortholog search: PDBe RCSB
PDB	List of PDB id codes 4RGW, 5FUR

Gene location (Human)
Chr.	Chromosome 5 (human)
Band	5q31.3	Start	141,259,884 bp
Band	5q31.3	End	141,320,784 bp

Gene location (Mouse)
Chr.	Chromosome 18 (mouse)
Band	18|18 B3	Start	37,773,544 bp
Band	18|18 B3	End	37,777,257 bp
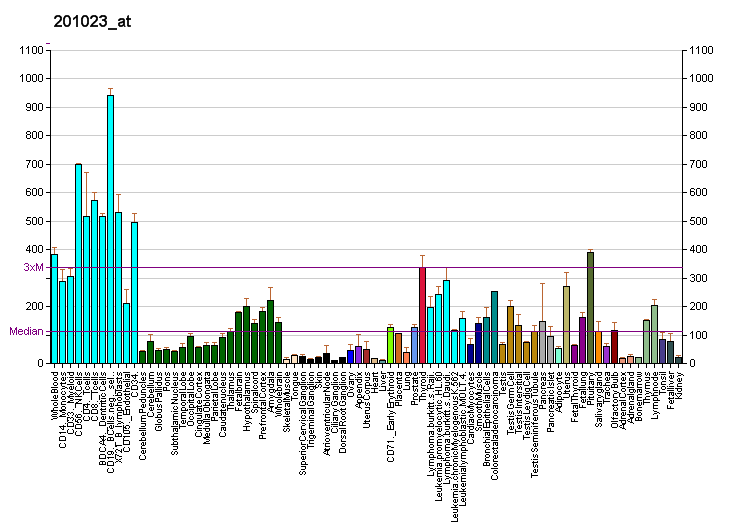
RNA expression pattern
Bgee	Human / Mouse (ortholog); Top expressed in: Achilles tendon; ganglionic eminence; Skeletal muscle tissue of biceps brachii; islet of Langerhans; ventricular zone; Skeletal muscle tissue of rectus abdominis; gastrocnemius muscle; Epithelium of choroid plexus; right ventricle; vastus lateralis muscle / Top expressed in: zygote; secondary oocyte; granulocyte; blastocyst; morula; embryo; epiblast; Gonadal ridge; primary oocyte; genital tubercle; More reference expression data
BioGPS	More reference expression data
Gene ontology
Molecular function	DNA-binding transcription factor activity; transcription coactivator activity; transcription factor binding; thyroid hormone receptor binding; protein binding; histone acetyltransferase binding; vitamin D receptor binding; protein heterodimerization activity; H3K27me3 modified histone binding; TFIIH-class transcription factor complex binding; P-TEFb complex binding
Cellular component	cytoplasm; Golgi apparatus; transcription factor TFTC complex; MLL1 complex; cyclin/CDK positive transcription elongation factor complex; nucleus; nucleoplasm; transcription regulator complex; transcription factor TFIID complex
Biological process	regulation of transcription, DNA-templated; negative regulation of protein kinase activity; regulation of transcription by RNA polymerase II; spermine transport; RNA polymerase II preinitiation complex assembly; negative regulation of transcription by RNA polymerase II; transcription, DNA-templated; DNA-templated transcription, initiation; negative regulation of transcription, DNA-templated; negative regulation of histone acetylation; intracellular estrogen receptor signaling pathway; positive regulation of transcription by RNA polymerase II; transcription by RNA polymerase II; transcription initiation from RNA polymerase II promoter; regulation of transcription initiation from RNA polymerase II promoter; regulation of signal transduction by p53 class mediator
Sources:Amigo / QuickGO
Orthologs
Databases	NCBI: entry; OMA: entry
Species	Human	Mouse
Entrez	6879	24074
Ensembl	ENSG00000178913	ENSMUSG00000051316
UniProt	Q15545	Q9R1C0
RefSeq (mRNA)	NM_005642	NM_175770
RefSeq (protein)	NP_005633	NP_786964
Location (UCSC)	Chr 5: 141.26 – 141.32 Mb	Chr 18: 37.77 – 37.78 Mb
PubMed search
- Wikidata
View/Edit Human	View/Edit Mouse

Transcription initiation factor TFIID subunit 7 also known as TAFII55 is a protein that in humans is encoded by the TAF7 gene.

== Function ==
The intronless gene for this transcription coactivator is located between the protocadherin beta and gamma gene clusters on chromosome 5. The protein encoded by this gene is a component of the TFIID protein complex, a complex which binds to the TATA box in class II promoters and recruits RNA polymerase II and other factors. This particular subunit interacts with the largest TFIID subunit, as well as multiple transcription activators. The protein is required for transcription by promoters targeted by RNA polymerase II.

TAFII55_N

Identifiers
- Symbol: TAFII55_N
- Pfam: PF04658
- InterPro: IPR006751
Available protein structures:
- PDB: IPR006751 PF04658 (ECOD; PDBsum)
- AlphaFold: IPR006751; PF04658

The general transcription factor, TFIID, consists of the TATA-binding protein (TBP) associated with a series of TBP-associated factors (TAFs) that together participate in the assembly of the transcription preinitiation complex. TAFII55 binds to TAFII250 and inhibits its acetyltransferase activity. The exact role of TAFII55 is currently unknown but studies have shown that it interacts with the C-jun pathway. The conserved region is situated towards the N-terminal of the protein. This entry talks about the N-terminal domain.

Crystallographic studies have revealed a very significant hydrophobic pocket between TAF7 and TAF1, its main binding partner. Due to the incredible hydrophobicity of this interaction, it is unlikely that TAF1 would be able to fold properly without the presence of TAF7. Thus, it is possible that TAF7 is required for proper production of TAF1

== Interactions ==
TAF7 has been shown to interact with:

- TAF15,
- TAF1, and
- TATA binding protein.
