= TAF12 =

Protein-coding gene in humans

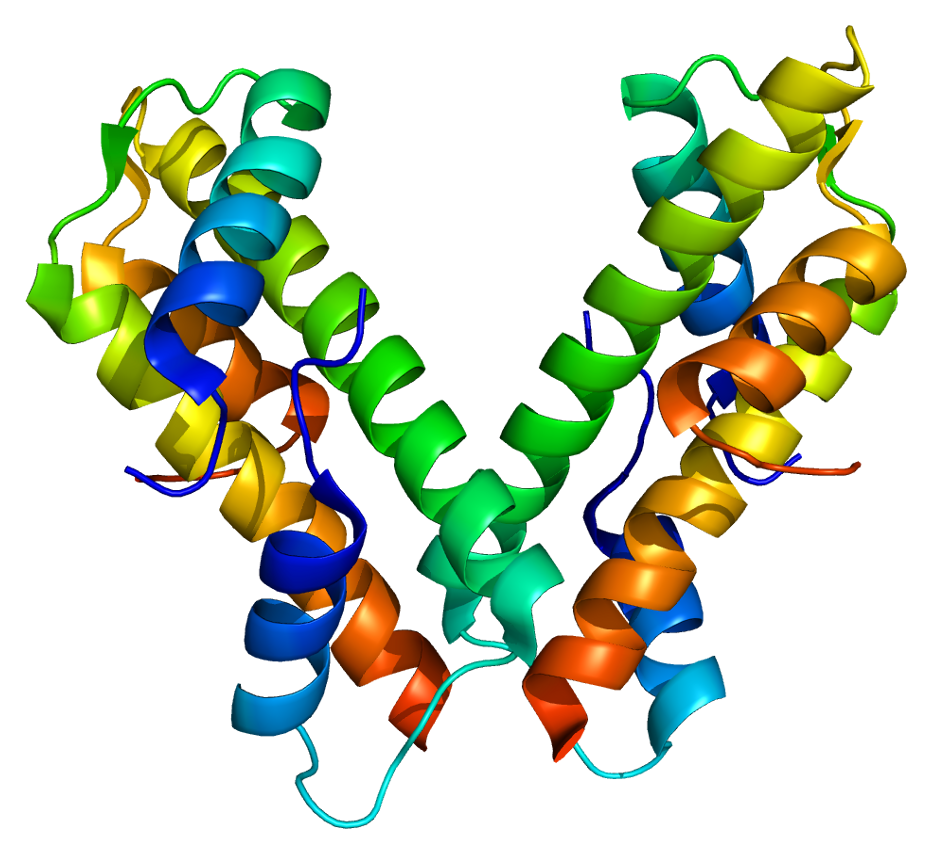

Identifiers
- Aliases: TAF12, TAF2J, TAFII20, TATA-box binding protein associated factor 12
- External IDs: OMIM: 600773; MGI: 1913714; GeneCards: TAF12
Available structures
PDB	Ortholog search: PDBe RCSB
PDB	List of PDB id codes 1H3O

Gene location (Human)
Chr.	Chromosome 1 (human)
Band	1p35.3	Start	28,587,829 bp
Band	1p35.3	End	28,648,291 bp

Gene location (Mouse)
Chr.	Chromosome 4 (mouse)
Band	4|4 D2.3	Start	132,001,686 bp
Band	4|4 D2.3	End	132,023,077 bp
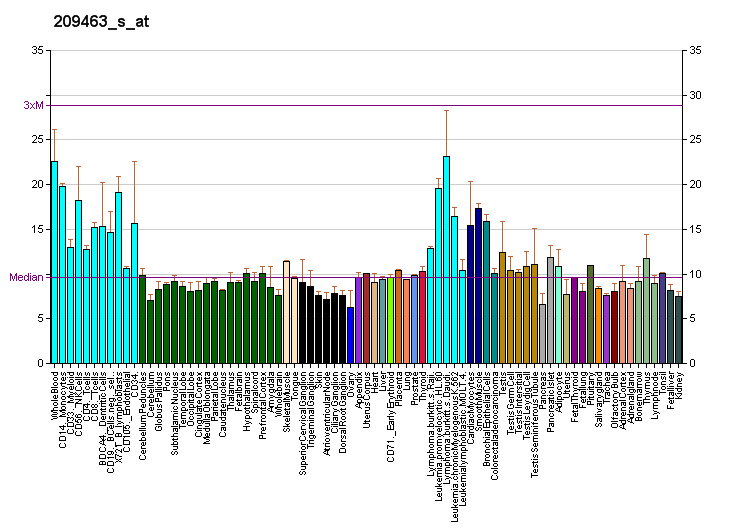
RNA expression pattern
Bgee	Human / Mouse (ortholog); Top expressed in: oocyte; monocyte; gastrocnemius muscle; testicle; Achilles tendon; muscle of thigh; granulocyte; apex of heart; right testis; left testis / Top expressed in: zygote; interventricular septum; granulocyte; muscle of thigh; right kidney; fetal liver hematopoietic progenitor cell; secondary oocyte; extraocular muscle; digastric muscle; morula; More reference expression data
BioGPS	More reference expression data
Gene ontology
Molecular function	DNA binding; DNA-binding transcription factor activity; transcription coactivator activity; transcription factor binding; protein binding; protein heterodimerization activity; TBP-class protein binding; histone acetyltransferase activity
Cellular component	transcription factor TFTC complex; transcription factor TFIID complex; nucleoplasm; nucleus; SAGA complex; SLIK (SAGA-like) complex
Biological process	regulation of transcription, DNA-templated; positive regulation of DNA-binding transcription factor activity; transcription by RNA polymerase II; transcription, DNA-templated; DNA-templated transcription, initiation; transcription initiation from RNA polymerase II promoter; regulation of signal transduction by p53 class mediator; RNA polymerase II preinitiation complex assembly; histone H3 acetylation; positive regulation of nucleic acid-templated transcription
Sources:Amigo / QuickGO
Orthologs
Databases	NCBI: entry; OMA: entry
Species	Human	Mouse
Entrez	6883	66464
Ensembl	ENSG00000120656	ENSMUSG00000028899
UniProt	Q16514	Q8VE65
RefSeq (mRNA)	NM_001135218; NM_005644	NM_025579
RefSeq (protein)	NP_001128690; NP_005635	NP_079855
Location (UCSC)	Chr 1: 28.59 – 28.65 Mb	Chr 4: 132 – 132.02 Mb
PubMed search
- Wikidata
View/Edit Human	View/Edit Mouse

Transcription initiation factor TFIID subunit 12 is a protein that in humans is encoded by the TAF12 gene.

== Function ==
Control of transcription by RNA polymerase II involves the basal transcription machinery, which is a collection of proteins. These proteins with RNA polymerase II, assemble into complexes that are modulated by transactivator proteins that bind to cis-regulatory elements located adjacent to the transcription start site. Some modulators interact directly with the basal complex, whereas others may act as bridging proteins linking transactivators to the basal transcription factors. Some of these associated factors are weakly attached, whereas others are tightly associated with TBP in the TFIID complex. Among the latter are the TAF proteins. Different TAFs are predicted to mediate the function of distinct transcriptional activators for a variety of gene promoters and RNA polymerases. TAF12 interacts directly with TBP as well as with TAF2I.

== Interactions ==
TAF12 has been shown to interact with TAF9 and Transcription initiation protein SPT3 homolog.
