= USP5 =

Protein-coding gene in the species Homo sapiens

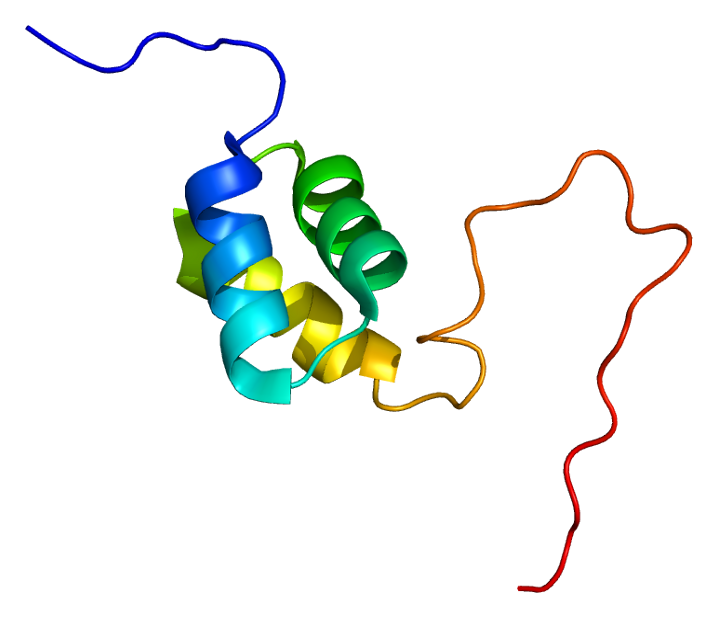

Identifiers
- Aliases: USP5, ISOT, ubiquitin specific peptidase 5
- External IDs: OMIM: 601447; MGI: 1347343; GeneCards: USP5
Available structures
PDB	Ortholog search: PDBe RCSB
PDB	List of PDB id codes 2DAG, 2DAK, 2G43, 2G45, 3IHP
Enzyme activity
EC #	BRENDA	ExPASy	KEGG	MetaCyc
3.4.19.12	↗	↗	↗	↗

Gene location (Human)
Chr.	Chromosome 12 (human)
Band	12p13.31	Start	6,852,128 bp
Band	12p13.31	End	6,866,632 bp

Gene location (Mouse)
Chr.	Chromosome 6 (mouse)
Band	6 F2|6 59.17 cM	Start	124,791,982 bp
Band	6 F2|6 59.17 cM	End	124,806,447 bp
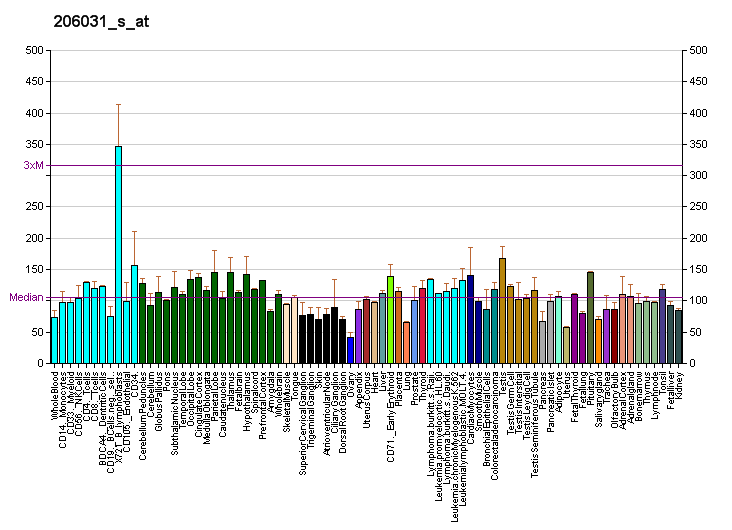
RNA expression pattern
Bgee	Human / Mouse (ortholog); Top expressed in: prefrontal cortex; left testis; right testis; right frontal lobe; right adrenal gland; right adrenal cortex; Brodmann area 9; left adrenal gland; lateral nuclear group of thalamus; gastrocnemius muscle / Top expressed in: spermatocyte; dentate gyrus of hippocampal formation granule cell; superior frontal gyrus; primary visual cortex; perirhinal cortex; entorhinal cortex; ventricular zone; otic vesicle; lip; medulla oblongata; More reference expression data
BioGPS	More reference expression data
Gene ontology
Molecular function	peptidase activity; cysteine-type peptidase activity; cysteine-type endopeptidase activity; zinc ion binding; ubiquitin binding; protein binding; hydrolase activity; metal ion binding; thiol-dependent deubiquitinase
Cellular component	lysosome; cytosol
Biological process	protein K48-linked deubiquitination; positive regulation of proteasomal ubiquitin-dependent protein catabolic process; ubiquitin-dependent protein catabolic process; proteolysis; protein deubiquitination; protein ubiquitination
Sources:Amigo / QuickGO
Orthologs
Databases	NCBI: entry; OMA: entry
Species	Human	Mouse
Entrez	8078	22225
Ensembl	ENSG00000111667	ENSMUSG00000038429
UniProt	P45974	P56399
RefSeq (mRNA)	NM_001098536; NM_003481	NM_013700; NM_001326594
RefSeq (protein)	NP_001092006; NP_003472; NP_001369517; NP_001369518; NP_001369519 NP_001369520	NP_001313523; NP_038728
Location (UCSC)	Chr 12: 6.85 – 6.87 Mb	Chr 6: 124.79 – 124.81 Mb
PubMed search
- Wikidata
View/Edit Human	View/Edit Mouse

Ubiquitin specific peptidase 5 is an enzyme that in humans is encoded by the USP5 gene.

== Interactions ==
USP5 has been shown to interact with TADA3L.
