= TAF9 =

Protein-coding gene in the species Homo sapiens

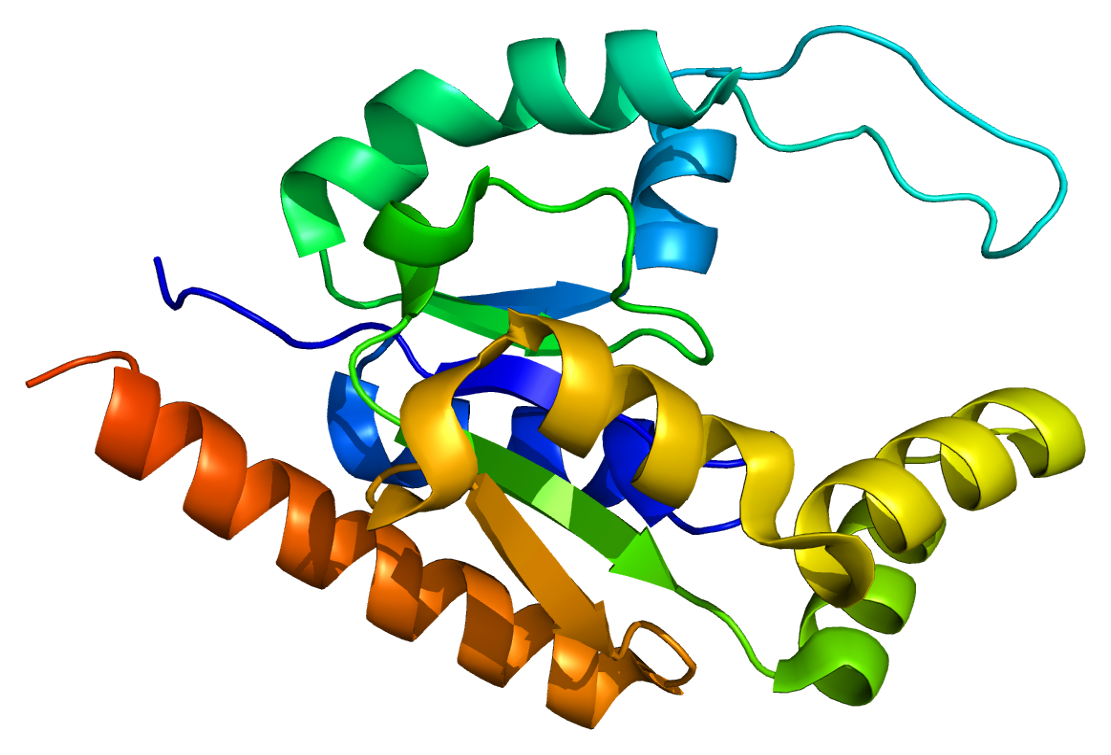

Identifiers
- Aliases: TAF9, MGC:5067, STAF31/32, TAF2G, TAFII-31, TAFII-32, TAFII31, TAFII32, TAFIID32, TATA-box binding protein associated factor 9
- External IDs: OMIM: 600822; MGI: 1888697; GeneCards: TAF9

Gene location (Human)
Chr.	Chromosome 5 (human)
Band	5q13.2	Start	69,362,026 bp
Band	5q13.2	End	69,370,013 bp

Gene location (Mouse)
Chr.	Chromosome 13 (mouse)
Band	13|13 D1	Start	100,788,087 bp
Band	13|13 D1	End	100,792,568 bp
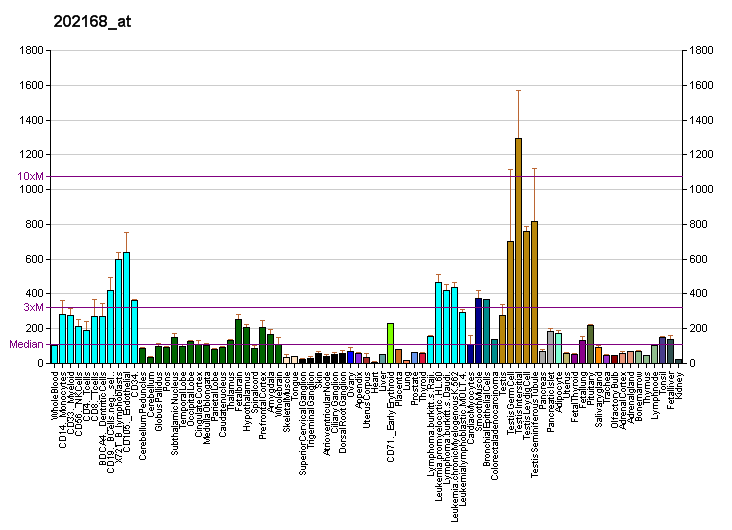

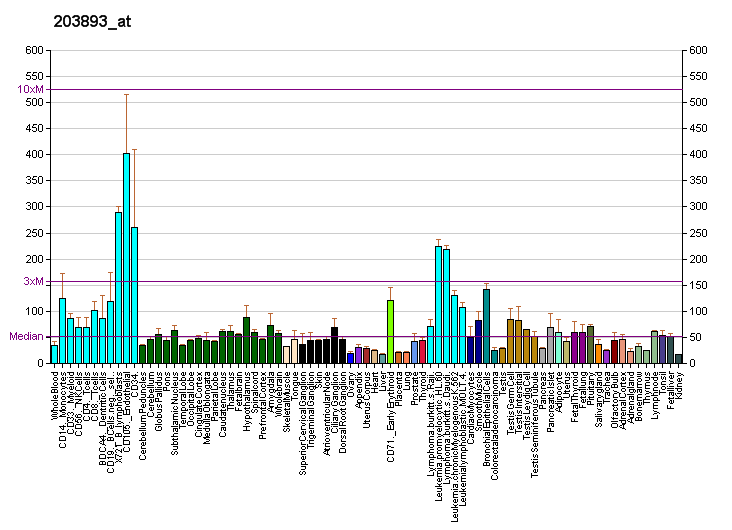
RNA expression pattern
Bgee	Human / Mouse (ortholog); Top expressed in: left testis; right testis; gonad; islet of Langerhans; rectum; superior frontal gyrus; prefrontal cortex; monocyte; dorsolateral prefrontal cortex; olfactory zone of nasal mucosa / Top expressed in: spermatid; spermatocyte; testicle; epiblast; genital tubercle; tail of embryo; secondary oocyte; zygote; primary oocyte; mesencephalon; More reference expression data
BioGPS	More reference expression data
Gene ontology
Molecular function	DNA binding; ATPase binding; transcription coactivator activity; p53 binding; C2H2 zinc finger domain binding; histone acetyltransferase activity; protein binding; protein heterodimerization activity; transcription factor binding; RNA polymerase II general transcription initiation factor activity
Cellular component	transcription factor TFTC complex; pre-snoRNP complex; transcription factor TFIID complex; MLL1 complex; SAGA complex; nucleus; nucleoplasm
Biological process	response to interleukin-1; regulation of transcription, DNA-templated; negative regulation of intrinsic apoptotic signaling pathway in response to DNA damage by p53 class mediator; protein stabilization; negative regulation of apoptotic process; transcription by RNA polymerase II; transcription, DNA-templated; cellular response to DNA damage stimulus; positive regulation of response to cytokine stimulus; box C/D snoRNP assembly; positive regulation of cell growth; histone H3 acetylation; DNA-templated transcription, initiation; negative regulation of proteasomal ubiquitin-dependent protein catabolic process; transcription initiation from RNA polymerase II promoter; positive regulation of transcription by RNA polymerase II; snRNA transcription by RNA polymerase II; regulation of signal transduction by p53 class mediator; RNA polymerase II preinitiation complex assembly
Sources:Amigo / QuickGO
Orthologs
Databases	NCBI: entry; OMA: entry
Species	Human	Mouse
Entrez	6880	108143
Ensembl	ENSG00000273841; ENSG00000276463	ENSMUSG00000052293
UniProt	Q16594	Q8VI33
RefSeq (mRNA)	NM_003187; NM_001015892	NM_001015889; NM_027139
RefSeq (protein)	NP_001015892; NP_003178	NP_001015889; NP_081415
Location (UCSC)	Chr 5: 69.36 – 69.37 Mb	Chr 13: 100.79 – 100.79 Mb
PubMed search
- Wikidata
View/Edit Human	View/Edit Mouse

TAF9 RNA polymerase II, TATA box binding protein (TBP)-associated factor, 32kDa, also known as TAF9, is a protein that in humans is encoded by the TAF9 gene.

== Function ==
Initiation of transcription by RNA polymerase II requires the activities of more than 70 polypeptides. The protein complex that coordinates these activities is transcription factor IID (TFIID), which binds to the core promoter to position the polymerase properly, serves as the scaffold for assembly of the remainder of the transcription complex, and acts as a channel for regulatory signals. TFIID is composed of the TATA-binding protein (TBP) and a group of evolutionarily conserved proteins known as TBP-associated factors or TAFs. TAFs may participate in basal transcription, serve as coactivators, function in promoter recognition or modify general transcription factors (GTFs) to facilitate complex assembly and transcription initiation. This gene encodes one of the smaller subunits of TFIID that binds to the basal transcription factor GTF2B as well as to several transcriptional activators such as p53 and VP16. A similar but distinct gene (TAF9B) has been found on the X chromosome and a pseudogene has been identified on chromosome 19. Alternative splicing results in multiple transcript variants encoding different isoforms.

== Structure ==
The 17-amino-acid-long trans-activating domains (TAD) of several transcription factors were reported to bind directly to TAF9: p53, VP16, HSF1, NF-IL6, NFAT1, NF-κB, and ALL1/MLL1. Inside of these 17 amino acids, a unique Nine-amino-acid transactivation domain (9aaTAD) was identified for each reported transcription factor. 9aaTAD is a novel domain common to a large superfamily of eukaryotic transcription factors represented by Gal4, Oaf1, Leu3, Rtg3, Pho4, Gln4, Gcn4 in yeast and by p53, NFAT, NF-κB and VP16 in mammals. TAF9 is supposed to be a universal transactivation cofactor for 9aaTAD transcription factors.

== Interactions ==
TAF9 has been shown to interact with:

- GCN5L2,
- Myc,
- SF3B3,
- SUPT7L,
- TADA3L,
- TAF5,
- TAF6L,
- TAF10,
- TAF12,
- TAF5L,
- TATA binding protein,
- Transcription initiation protein SPT3 homolog, and
- Transformation/transcription domain-associated protein.
