= Transcription initiation protein SPT3 homolog =

Protein-coding gene in the species Homo sapiens

SUPT3H

Identifiers
- Aliases: SUPT3H, SPT3, SPT3L, SPT3 homolog, SAGA and STAGA complex component
- External IDs: OMIM: 602947; MGI: 1923723; GeneCards: SUPT3H

Gene location (Human)
Chr.	Chromosome 6 (human)
Band	6p21.1	Start	44,809,317 bp
Band	6p21.1	End	45,377,953 bp

Gene location (Mouse)
Chr.	Chromosome 17 (mouse)
Band	17|17 B3	Start	45,088,039 bp
Band	17|17 B3	End	45,430,177 bp
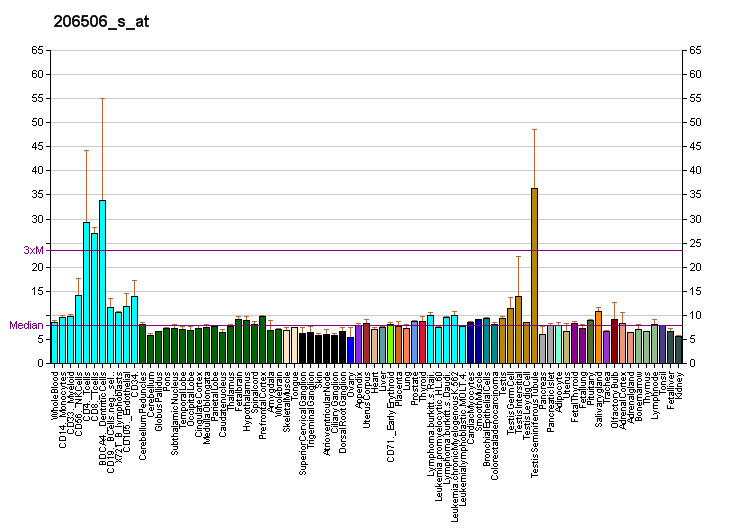

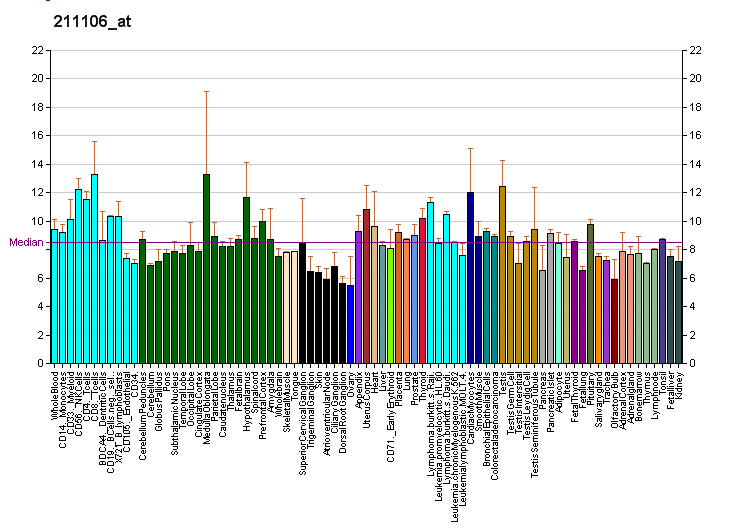
RNA expression pattern
Bgee	Human / Mouse (ortholog); Top expressed in: gonad; sperm; testicle; oocyte; left testis; sural nerve; right testis; cartilage tissue; ventricular zone; left ovary / Top expressed in: hand; interventricular septum; muscle of thigh; primary oocyte; zygote; seminiferous tubule; spermatid; otolith organ; granulocyte; utricle; More reference expression data
BioGPS	More reference expression data
Gene ontology
Molecular function	protein heterodimerization activity; histone acetyltransferase activity; transcription coactivator activity; DNA binding; transcription coregulator activity
Cellular component	transcription factor TFTC complex; nucleus; nucleoplasm; SAGA complex; transcription factor TFIID complex
Biological process	regulation of transcription by RNA polymerase II; positive regulation of transcription, DNA-templated; histone deubiquitination; regulation of transcription, DNA-templated; transcription by RNA polymerase II; histone H3 acetylation; transcription, DNA-templated
Sources:Amigo / QuickGO
Orthologs
Databases	NCBI: entry; OMA: entry
Species	Human	Mouse
Entrez	8464	109115
Ensembl	ENSG00000196284	ENSMUSG00000038954
UniProt	O75486	n/a
RefSeq (mRNA)	NM_001261823; NM_003599; NM_181356; NM_001350324; NM_001350325 NM_001350326; NM_001350327; NM_001350329	NM_178652; NM_001357320
RefSeq (protein)	NP_001248752; NP_003590; NP_852001; NP_001337253; NP_001337254 NP_001337255; NP_001337256; NP_001337258	n/a
Location (UCSC)	Chr 6: 44.81 – 45.38 Mb	Chr 17: 45.09 – 45.43 Mb
PubMed search
- Wikidata
View/Edit Human	View/Edit Mouse

Transcription initiation protein SPT3 homolog is a protein that in humans is encoded by the SUPT3H gene.

== Interactions ==
Transcription initiation protein SPT3 homolog has been shown to interact with GCN5L2, TAF6L, TADA3L, TAF5L, SF3B3, SUPT7L, Myc, TAF9, Transformation/transcription domain-associated protein, TAF12, TAF10, TAF4 and DDB1.
