= SF3B3 =

Protein-coding gene in the species Homo sapiens

Identifiers
- Aliases: SF3B3, RSE1, SAP130, SF3b130, STAF130, splicing factor 3b subunit 3
- External IDs: OMIM: 605592; MGI: 1289341; GeneCards: SF3B3

Gene location (Human)
Chr.	Chromosome 16 (human)
Band	16q22.1	Start	70,523,791 bp
Band	16q22.1	End	70,577,670 bp

Gene location (Mouse)
Chr.	Chromosome 8 (mouse)
Band	8 E1|8 57.73 cM	Start	111,536,871 bp
Band	8 E1|8 57.73 cM	End	111,573,419 bp
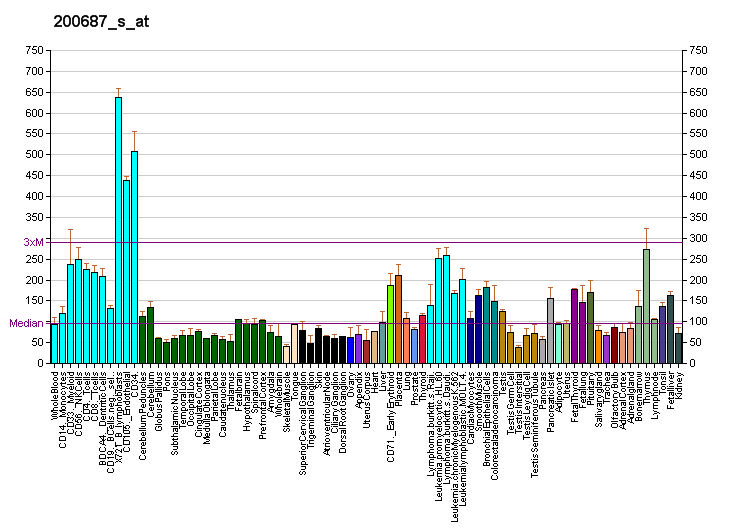
RNA expression pattern
Bgee	Human / Mouse (ortholog); Top expressed in: ventricular zone; ganglionic eminence; stromal cell of endometrium; left ovary; right ovary; ectocervix; skin of leg; skin of abdomen; canal of the cervix; body of uterus / Top expressed in: maxillary prominence; mandibular prominence; somite; epiblast; primitive streak; ventricular zone; endocardial cushion; tail of embryo; human fetus; dermis; More reference expression data
BioGPS	More reference expression data
Gene ontology
Molecular function	protein binding; RNA binding; nucleic acid binding; protein-containing complex binding
Cellular component	catalytic step 2 spliceosome; spliceosomal complex; U12-type spliceosomal complex; nucleolus; small nuclear ribonucleoprotein complex; nucleus; nucleoplasm; U2-type precatalytic spliceosome
Biological process	RNA splicing, via transesterification reactions; mRNA splicing, via spliceosome; mRNA processing; RNA splicing; negative regulation of protein catabolic process; protein-containing complex assembly
Sources:Amigo / QuickGO
Orthologs
Databases	NCBI: entry; OMA: entry
Species	Human	Mouse
Entrez	23450	101943
Ensembl	ENSG00000189091	ENSMUSG00000033732
UniProt	Q15393	Q921M3
RefSeq (mRNA)	NM_012426	NM_133953
RefSeq (protein)	NP_036558	NP_598714
Location (UCSC)	Chr 16: 70.52 – 70.58 Mb	Chr 8: 111.54 – 111.57 Mb
PubMed search
- Wikidata
View/Edit Human	View/Edit Mouse

Splicing factor 3B subunit 3 is a protein that in humans is encoded by the SF3B3 gene.

This gene encodes subunit 3 of the splicing factor 3b protein complex. Splicing factor 3b, together with splicing factor 3a and a 12S RNA unit, forms the U2 small nuclear ribonucleoproteins complex (U2 snRNP). The splicing factor 3b/3a complex binds pre-mRNA upstream of the intron's branch site in a sequence independent manner and may anchor the U2 snRNP to the pre-mRNA. Splicing factor 3b is also a component of the minor U12-type spliceosome. Subunit 3 has also been identified as a component of the STAGA (SPT3-TAF(II)31-GCN5L acetylase) transcription coactivator-HAT (histone acetyltransferase) complex, and the TFTC (TATA-binding-protein-free TAF(II)-containing complex). These complexes may function in chromatin modification, transcription, splicing, and DNA repair.

== Interactions ==
SF3B3 has been shown to interact with SF3B1, Transcription initiation protein SPT3 homolog and TAF9.
