= KAT2A =

Protein-coding gene in the species Homo sapiens

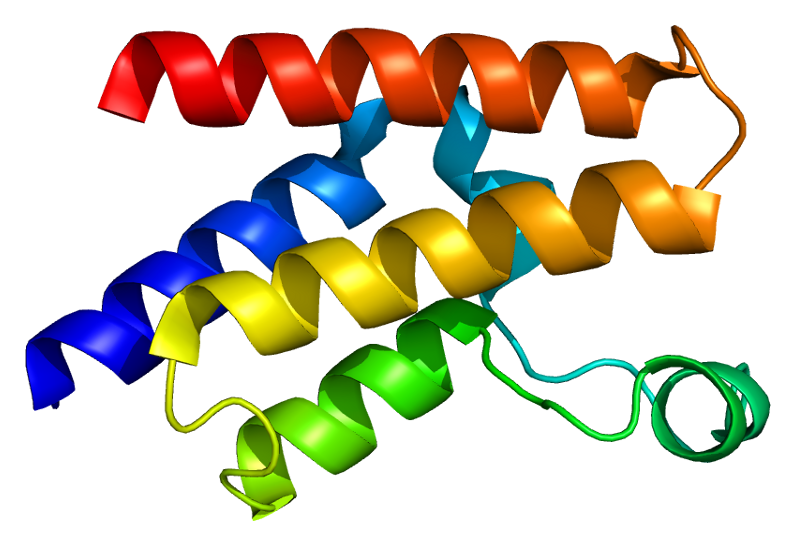

Identifiers
- Aliases: KAT2A, GCN5, GCN5L2, PCAF-b, hGCN5, lysine acetyltransferase 2A
- External IDs: OMIM: 602301; MGI: 1343101; GeneCards: KAT2A
Available structures
PDB	Ortholog search: PDBe RCSB
PDB	List of PDB id codes 1F68, 1Z4R, 3D7C, 5H86, 5H84
Enzyme activity
EC #	BRENDA	ExPASy	KEGG	MetaCyc
2.3.1.48	↗	↗	↗	↗

Gene location (Human)
Chr.	Chromosome 17 (human)
Band	17q21.2	Start	42,113,111 bp
Band	17q21.2	End	42,121,367 bp

Gene location (Mouse)
Chr.	Chromosome 11 (mouse)
Band	11 D|11 63.53 cM	Start	100,595,572 bp
Band	11 D|11 63.53 cM	End	100,603,291 bp
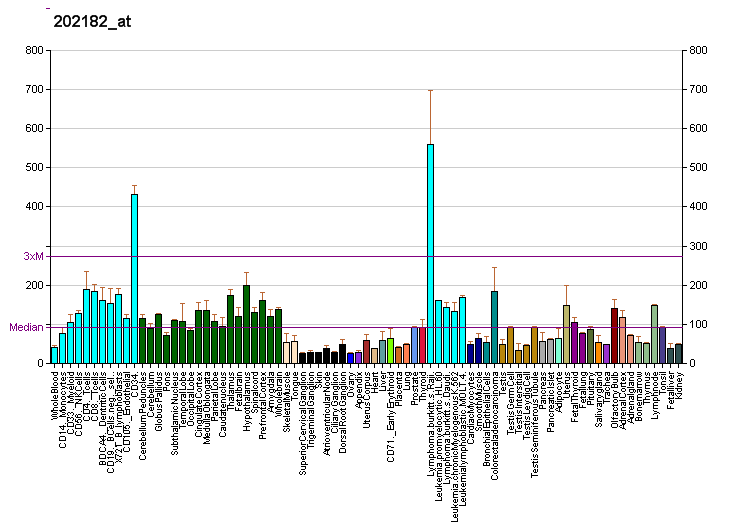
RNA expression pattern
Bgee	Human / Mouse (ortholog); Top expressed in: right uterine tube; left ovary; right ovary; right hemisphere of cerebellum; right adrenal cortex; right frontal lobe; left uterine tube; left adrenal cortex; body of uterus; canal of the cervix / Top expressed in: internal carotid artery; external carotid artery; otic placode; tail of embryo; otic vesicle; saccule; genital tubercle; epiblast; lacrimal gland; hair follicle; More reference expression data
BioGPS	More reference expression data
Gene ontology
Molecular function	transferase activity; transcription coactivator activity; N-acetyltransferase activity; transcription factor binding; histone deacetylase binding; chromatin binding; H3 histone acetyltransferase activity; protein binding; acetyltransferase activity; histone acetyltransferase activity (H4-K12 specific); protein phosphatase binding; acyltransferase activity; histone acetyltransferase activity; thiol-dependent deubiquitinase; peptide-lysine-N-acetyltransferase activity; histone succinyltransferase activity
Cellular component	transcription factor TFTC complex; nucleoplasm; histone acetyltransferase complex; mitotic spindle; extracellular space; nucleus; chromosome; cytoplasm; centrosome; microtubule organizing center; cytoskeleton; oxoglutarate dehydrogenase complex
Biological process	positive regulation of transcription regulatory region DNA binding; somitogenesis; epigenetic maintenance of chromatin in transcription-competent conformation; chromatin remodeling; metencephalon development; cellular response to nerve growth factor stimulus; regulation of transcription, DNA-templated; regulation of protein stability; response to organic cyclic compound; multicellular organism growth; positive regulation of protein targeting to mitochondrion; regulation of transcription by RNA polymerase II; cardiac muscle cell differentiation; cellular response to tumor necrosis factor; histone H3-K14 acetylation; positive regulation of cell projection organization; in utero embryonic development; transcription by RNA polymerase II; transcription, DNA-templated; nervous system development; positive regulation of histone acetylation; histone deubiquitination; telencephalon development; neural tube closure; response to nutrient levels; regulation of autophagy of mitochondrion; histone acetylation; histone H3 acetylation; cell population proliferation; viral process; intracellular distribution of mitochondria; histone H4-K12 acetylation; alpha-tubulin acetylation; midbrain development; protein deubiquitination; cytokine production; development of the heart; long-term memory; internal peptidyl-lysine acetylation; regulation of regulatory T cell differentiation; positive regulation of transcription by RNA polymerase II; negative regulation of centriole replication; regulation of synaptic plasticity; regulation of T cell activation; limb development; histone succinylation; positive regulation of cardiac muscle cell differentiation
Sources:Amigo / QuickGO
Orthologs
Databases	NCBI: entry; OMA: entry
Species	Human	Mouse
Entrez	2648	14534
Ensembl	ENSG00000108773	ENSMUSG00000020918
UniProt	Q92830	Q9JHD2
RefSeq (mRNA)	NM_021078; NM_001376227	NM_001038010; NM_020004
RefSeq (protein)	NP_066564; NP_001363156	NP_001033099; NP_064388
Location (UCSC)	Chr 17: 42.11 – 42.12 Mb	Chr 11: 100.6 – 100.6 Mb
PubMed search
- Wikidata
View/Edit Human	View/Edit Mouse

Histone acetyltransferase KAT2A is an enzyme that in humans is encoded by the KAT2A gene.

KAT2A also acetylates non-histone proteins, including the transcription factor PAX6, promoting its ubiquitination and proteasomal degradation and thereby influencing the balance between proliferation and neuronal differentiation in neural stem cells.

== Interactions ==
GCN5L2 has been shown to interact with:

- DDB1,
- Ku70,
- Ku80,
- TADA2L,
- TAF9, and
- Transcription initiation protein SPT3 homolog.
