= TADA2L =

Protein-coding gene in the species Homo sapiens

TADA2A
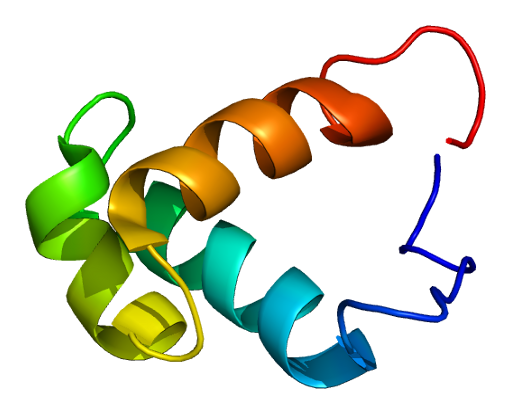

Identifiers
- Aliases: TADA2A, ADA2, ADA2A, TADA2L, hADA2, KL04P, transcriptional adaptor 2A
- External IDs: OMIM: 602276; MGI: 2144471; GeneCards: TADA2A
Available structures
PDB	Ortholog search: PDBe RCSB
PDB	List of PDB id codes 1X41

Gene location (Human)
Chr.	Chromosome 17 (human)
Band	17q12	Start	37,406,886 bp
Band	17q12	End	37,479,725 bp

Gene location (Mouse)
Chr.	Chromosome 11 (mouse)
Band	11|11 C	Start	83,969,746 bp
Band	11|11 C	End	84,020,426 bp
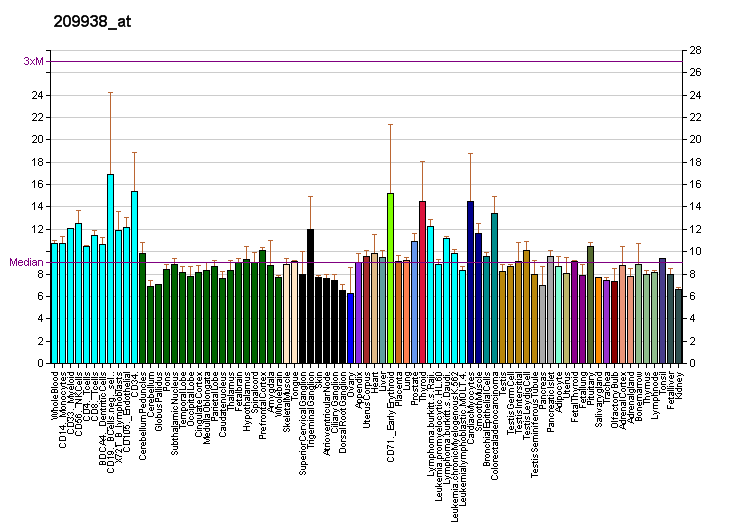

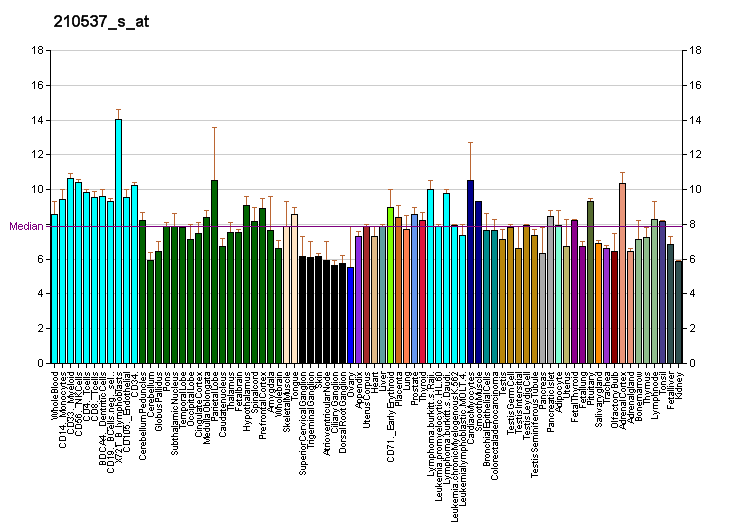
RNA expression pattern
Bgee	Human / Mouse (ortholog); Top expressed in: testicle; Achilles tendon; corpus callosum; ventricular zone; ganglionic eminence; right testis; left testis; bone marrow cell; skeletal muscle tissue; endometrium / Top expressed in: otic vesicle; saccule; neural layer of retina; epiblast; renal corpuscle; ventricular zone; otic placode; secondary oocyte; primary oocyte; medullary collecting duct; More reference expression data
BioGPS	More reference expression data
Gene ontology
Molecular function	protein binding; histone acetyltransferase activity; DNA-binding transcription factor activity; DNA binding; chromatin binding; transcription coregulator activity; transcription coactivator activity; DNA-binding transcription factor activity, RNA polymerase II-specific
Cellular component	nucleus; chromosome; SAGA-type complex
Biological process	positive regulation of histone acetylation; histone H3 acetylation; regulation of transcription, DNA-templated; transcription by RNA polymerase II; regulation of transcription by RNA polymerase II; transcription, DNA-templated; chromatin remodeling; regulation of histone acetylation; positive regulation of nucleic acid-templated transcription
Sources:Amigo / QuickGO
Orthologs
Databases	NCBI: entry; OMA: entry
Species	Human	Mouse
Entrez	6871	217031
Ensembl	ENSG00000276234; ENSG00000277104	ENSMUSG00000018651
UniProt	O75478	Q8CHV6
RefSeq (mRNA)	NM_001166105; NM_001291918; NM_001488; NM_133439	NM_172562
RefSeq (protein)	NP_001159577; NP_001278847; NP_001479; NP_597683	NP_766150
Location (UCSC)	Chr 17: 37.41 – 37.48 Mb	Chr 11: 83.97 – 84.02 Mb
PubMed search
- Wikidata
View/Edit Human	View/Edit Mouse

Transcriptional adapter 2-alpha is a protein that in humans is encoded by the TADA2A gene.

== Function ==
Many DNA-binding transcriptional activator proteins enhance the initiation rate of RNA polymerase II-mediated gene transcription by interacting functionally with the general transcription machinery bound at the basal promoter. Adaptor proteins are usually required for this activation, possibly to acetylate and destabilize nucleosomes, thereby relieving chromatin constraints at the promoter. The protein encoded by this gene is a transcriptional activator adaptor and has been found to be part of the PCAF histone acetylase complex. Two transcript variants encoding different isoforms have been identified for this gene.

== Interactions ==
TADA2L has been shown to interact with GCN5L2, TADA3L and Myc.
