= TAF6L =

Protein-coding gene in the species Homo sapiens

Identifiers
- Aliases: TAF6L, PAF65A, TATA-box binding protein associated factor 6 like
- External IDs: OMIM: 602946; MGI: 2444957; GeneCards: TAF6L

Gene location (Human)
Chr.	Chromosome 11 (human)
Band	11q12.3	Start	62,771,357 bp
Band	11q12.3	End	62,787,342 bp

Gene location (Mouse)
Chr.	Chromosome 19 (mouse)
Band	19|19 A	Start	8,751,851 bp
Band	19|19 A	End	8,763,781 bp
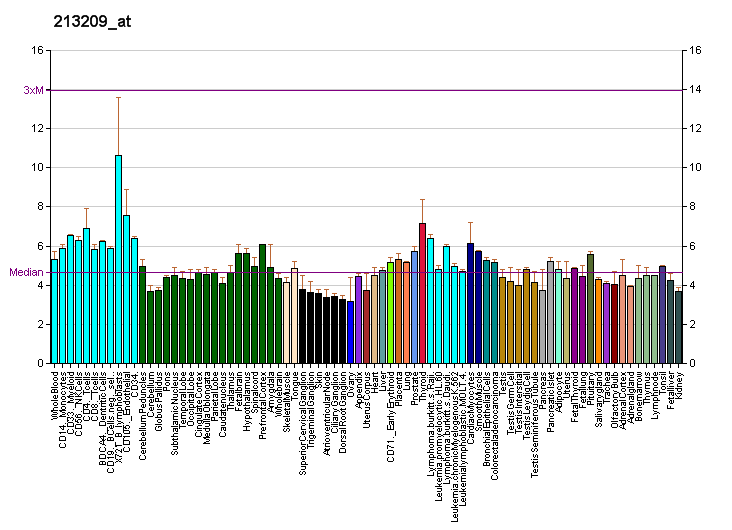

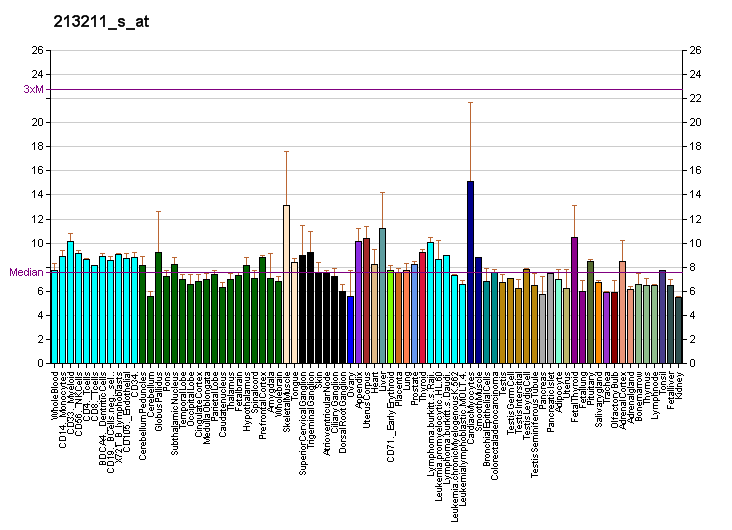

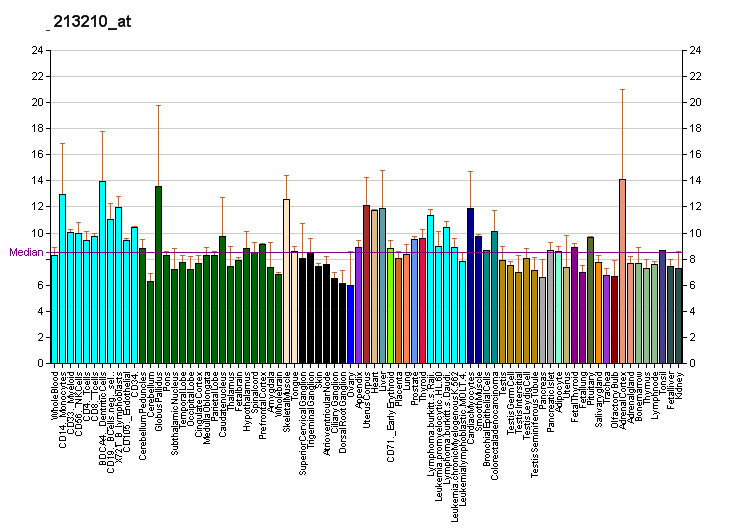
RNA expression pattern
Bgee	Human / Mouse (ortholog); Top expressed in: right lobe of thyroid gland; right lobe of liver; apex of heart; left lobe of thyroid gland; anterior pituitary; left uterine tube; right ovary; body of pancreas; gastrocnemius muscle; muscle of thigh / Top expressed in: saccule; tail of embryo; otic vesicle; spermatid; spermatocyte; ventricular zone; genital tubercle; embryo; yolk sac; right kidney; More reference expression data
BioGPS	More reference expression data
Gene ontology
Molecular function	DNA binding; transcription coactivator activity; protein binding; protein heterodimerization activity; histone acetyltransferase activity; DNA-binding transcription factor activity
Cellular component	histone deacetylase complex; extracellular exosome; nucleoplasm; nucleus; SAGA complex; transcription factor TFIID complex; SLIK (SAGA-like) complex
Biological process	regulation of transcription by RNA polymerase II; chromatin remodeling; regulation of transcription, DNA-templated; regulation of DNA-binding transcription factor activity; histone H3 acetylation; transcription, DNA-templated; DNA-templated transcription, initiation; chromatin organization; transcription by RNA polymerase II; transcription initiation from RNA polymerase II promoter; positive regulation of nucleic acid-templated transcription; RNA polymerase II preinitiation complex assembly
Sources:Amigo / QuickGO
Orthologs
Databases	NCBI: entry; OMA: entry
Species	Human	Mouse
Entrez	10629	225895
Ensembl	ENSG00000162227	ENSMUSG00000003680
UniProt	Q9Y6J9	Q8R2K4
RefSeq (mRNA)	NM_006473	NM_001177798; NM_146092
RefSeq (protein)	NP_006464	NP_001171269; NP_666204
Location (UCSC)	Chr 11: 62.77 – 62.79 Mb	Chr 19: 8.75 – 8.76 Mb
PubMed search
- Wikidata
View/Edit Human	View/Edit Mouse

TAF6-like RNA polymerase II p300/CBP-associated factor-associated factor 65 kDa subunit 6L is an enzyme that in humans is encoded by the TAF6L gene.

== Function ==
Initiation of transcription by RNA polymerase II requires the activities of more than 70 polypeptides. The protein that coordinates these activities is transcription factor IID (TFIID), which binds to the core promoter to position the polymerase properly, serves as the scaffold for assembly of the remainder of the transcription complex, and acts as a channel for regulatory signals. TFIID is composed of the TATA-binding protein (TBP) and a group of evolutionarily conserved proteins known as TBP-associated factors or TAFs. TAFs may participate in basal transcription, serve as coactivators, function in promoter recognition or modify general transcription factors (GTFs) to facilitate complex assembly and transcription initiation. This gene encodes a protein that is a component of the PCAF histone acetylase complex and structurally similar to one of the histone-like TAFs, TAF6. The PCAF histone acetylase complex, which is composed of more than 20 polypeptides some of which are TAFs, is required for myogenic transcription and differentiation.

== Interactions ==
TAF6L has been shown to interact with TAF9 and Transcription initiation protein SPT3 homolog.
