= SUPT7L =

Protein-coding gene in the species Homo sapiens

Identifiers
- Aliases: SUPT7L, SPT7L, STAF65, STAF65(gamma), STAF65G, SUPT7H, SPT7-like STAGA complex gamma subunit, SPT7 like, STAGA complex gamma subunit, SPT7 like, STAGA complex subunit gamma
- External IDs: OMIM: 612762; MGI: 1919445; GeneCards: SUPT7L

Gene location (Human)
Chr.	Chromosome 2 (human)
Band	2p23.3	Start	27,650,809 bp
Band	2p23.3	End	27,663,840 bp

Gene location (Mouse)
Chr.	Chromosome 5 (mouse)
Band	5|5 B1	Start	31,671,908 bp
Band	5|5 B1	End	31,685,151 bp
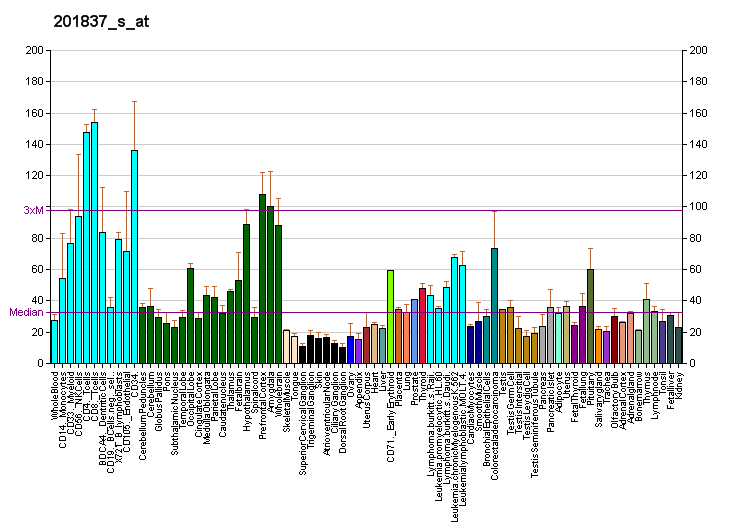

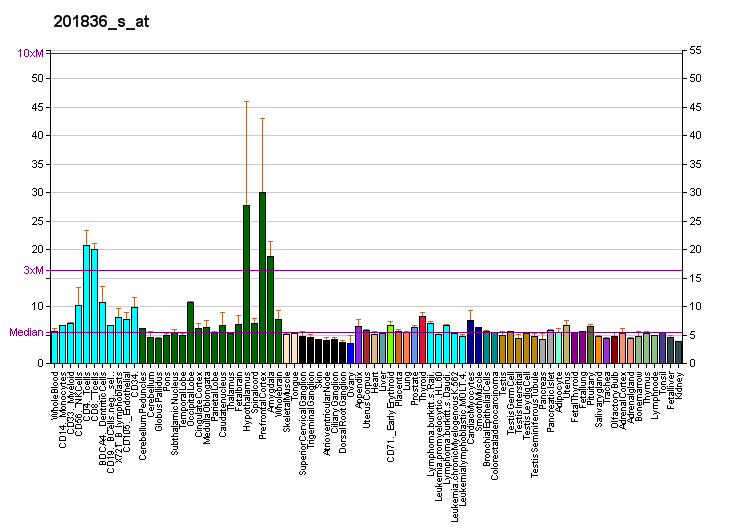

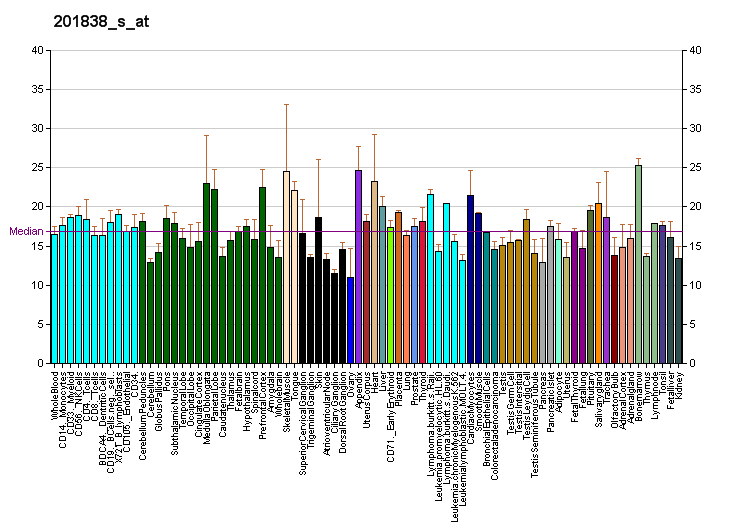
RNA expression pattern
Bgee	Human / Mouse (ortholog); Top expressed in: middle temporal gyrus; right uterine tube; anterior pituitary; right hemisphere of cerebellum; left ovary; apex of heart; right ovary; granulocyte; right lobe of thyroid gland; right frontal lobe / Top expressed in: Rostral migratory stream; zygote; secondary oocyte; tail of embryo; ventricular zone; genital tubercle; aortic valve; cumulus cell; ascending aorta; proximal tubule; More reference expression data
BioGPS	More reference expression data
Gene ontology
Molecular function	transcription coactivator activity; protein binding; histone acetyltransferase activity; protein heterodimerization activity
Cellular component	nucleus; nucleoplasm
Biological process	regulation of transcription, DNA-templated; maintenance of protein location in nucleus; histone H3 acetylation; transcription, DNA-templated; positive regulation of nucleic acid-templated transcription
Sources:Amigo / QuickGO
Orthologs
Databases	NCBI: entry; OMA: entry
Species	Human	Mouse
Entrez	9913	72195
Ensembl	ENSG00000119760	ENSMUSG00000053134
UniProt	O94864	Q9CZV5
RefSeq (mRNA)	NM_001282729; NM_001282730; NM_001282731; NM_001282732; NM_014860	NM_028150
RefSeq (protein)	NP_001269658; NP_001269659; NP_001269660; NP_001269661; NP_055675	NP_082426
Location (UCSC)	Chr 2: 27.65 – 27.66 Mb	Chr 5: 31.67 – 31.69 Mb
PubMed search
- Wikidata
View/Edit Human	View/Edit Mouse

STAGA complex 65 subunit gamma is a protein that in humans is encoded by the SUPT7L gene.

== Interactions ==
SUPT7L has been shown to interact with TAF9 and Transcription initiation protein SPT3 homolog.
