= TADA3L =

Protein-coding gene in the species Homo sapiens

TADA3

Identifiers
- Aliases: TADA3, ADA3, NGG1, STAF54, TADA3L, hADA3, transcriptional adaptor 3
- External IDs: OMIM: 602945; MGI: 1915724; GeneCards: TADA3

Gene location (Human)
Chr.	Chromosome 3 (human)
Band	3p25.3	Start	9,779,964 bp
Band	3p25.3	End	9,793,011 bp

Gene location (Mouse)
Chr.	Chromosome 6 (mouse)
Band	6|6 E3	Start	113,342,986 bp
Band	6|6 E3	End	113,354,844 bp
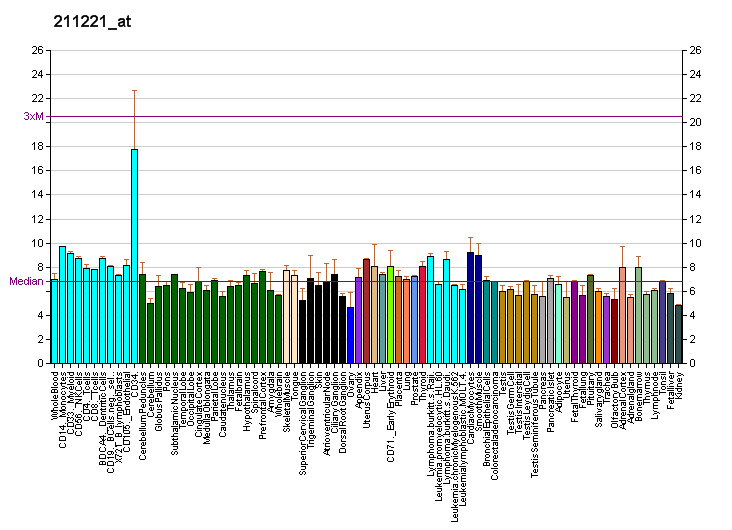

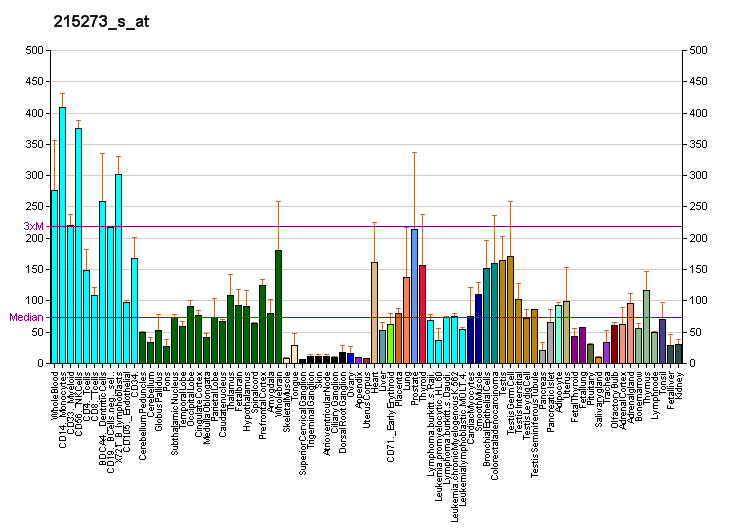
RNA expression pattern
Bgee	Human / Mouse (ortholog); Top expressed in: right adrenal gland; left adrenal gland; stromal cell of endometrium; prefrontal cortex; right coronary artery; amygdala; anterior pituitary; cingulate gyrus; thoracic aorta; ascending aorta / Top expressed in: zygote; genital tubercle; secondary oocyte; seminiferous tubule; tail of embryo; granulocyte; blastocyst; ventricular zone; neural tube; primary oocyte; More reference expression data
BioGPS	More reference expression data
Gene ontology
Molecular function	protein domain specific binding; DNA-binding transcription factor activity; transcription coactivator activity; histone acetyltransferase activity; protein binding; nuclear receptor binding; nuclear receptor coactivator activity; thiol-dependent deubiquitinase
Cellular component	transcription factor TFTC complex; intracellular anatomical structure; mitotic spindle; SAGA complex; nucleoplasm; nucleus
Biological process	regulation of protein phosphorylation; regulation of transcription, DNA-templated; regulation of protein stability; regulation of transcription by RNA polymerase II; regulation of histone deacetylation; transcription, DNA-templated; positive regulation of transcription, DNA-templated; regulation of tubulin deacetylation; positive regulation of gene expression; histone H3 acetylation; intracellular estrogen receptor signaling pathway; protein deubiquitination; histone H4 acetylation; mitotic cell cycle
Sources:Amigo / QuickGO
Orthologs
Databases	NCBI: entry
Species	Human	Mouse
Entrez	10474	101206
Ensembl	n/a	ENSMUSG00000048930
UniProt	O75528	Q8R0L9
RefSeq (mRNA)	NM_001278270; NM_006354; NM_133480; NM_133481	NM_133932; NM_001372392; NM_001372393
RefSeq (protein)	NP_001265199; NP_006345; NP_597814	NP_598693; NP_001359321; NP_001359322
Location (UCSC)	Chr 3: 9.78 – 9.79 Mb	Chr 6: 113.34 – 113.35 Mb
PubMed search
- Wikidata
View/Edit Human	View/Edit Mouse

Transcriptional adapter 3-like is a protein that in humans is encoded by the TADA3 gene. Its cytogenic location is 3p25.3.

== Function ==
Many DNA-binding transcriptional activator proteins enhance the initiation rate of RNA polymerase II-mediated gene transcription by interacting functionally with the general transcription machinery bound at the basal promoter. Adaptor proteins are usually required for this activation, possibly to acetylate and destabilize nucleosomes, thereby relieving chromatin constraints at the promoter. The protein encoded by this gene is a transcriptional activator adaptor and has been found to be part of the PCAF histone acetylase complex. In addition, it associates with the tumor suppressor protein p53 and is required for full activity of p53 and p53-mediated apoptosis. At least four alternatively spliced variants have been found for this gene, but the full-length nature of some variants has not been determined.

== Interactions ==
TADA3L has been shown to interact with:

- Retinoic acid receptor alpha,
- Retinoid X receptor alpha,
- TADA2L,
- TAF9,
- Transcription initiation protein SPT3 homolog, and
- USP5.
