= TAF5L =

Protein-coding gene in humans

Identifiers
- Aliases: TAF5L, PAF65B, TATA-box binding protein associated factor 5 like
- External IDs: MGI: 1919039; GeneCards: TAF5L

Gene location (Human)
Chr.	Chromosome 1 (human)
Band	1q42.13	Start	229,593,121 bp
Band	1q42.13	End	229,626,047 bp

Gene location (Mouse)
Chr.	Chromosome 8 (mouse)
Band	8|8 E2	Start	124,723,057 bp
Band	8|8 E2	End	124,748,136 bp
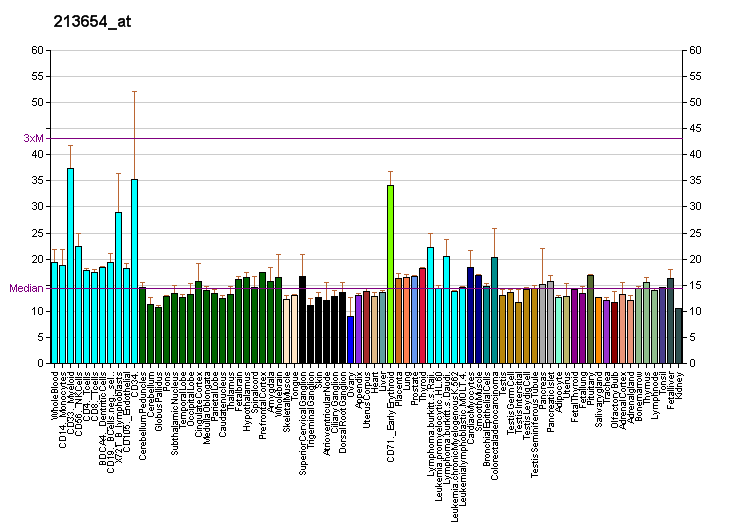
RNA expression pattern
Bgee	Human / Mouse (ortholog); Top expressed in: buccal mucosa cell; popliteal artery; tibial arteries; secondary oocyte; right coronary artery; thoracic aorta; ascending aorta; Descending thoracic aorta; monocyte; gastrocnemius muscle / Top expressed in: interventricular septum; otic vesicle; genital tubercle; tail of embryo; otic placode; saccule; spermatid; epiblast; thymus; hair follicle; More reference expression data
BioGPS	More reference expression data
Gene ontology
Molecular function	DNA-binding transcription factor activity; transcription coactivator activity; protein binding; histone acetyltransferase activity
Cellular component	nuclear speck; nucleus; cytoplasmic ribonucleoprotein granule; transcription factor TFTC complex
Biological process	regulation of transcription, DNA-templated; transcription by RNA polymerase II; histone H3 acetylation; transcription, DNA-templated; positive regulation of nucleic acid-templated transcription
Sources:Amigo / QuickGO
Orthologs
Databases	NCBI: entry; OMA: entry
Species	Human	Mouse
Entrez	27097	102162
Ensembl	ENSG00000135801	ENSMUSG00000038697
UniProt	O75529	Q91WQ5
RefSeq (mRNA)	NM_001025247; NM_014409	NM_133966; NM_001357315
RefSeq (protein)	NP_001020418; NP_055224	NP_598727; NP_001344244
Location (UCSC)	Chr 1: 229.59 – 229.63 Mb	Chr 8: 124.72 – 124.75 Mb
PubMed search
- Wikidata
View/Edit Human	View/Edit Mouse

TAF5-like RNA polymerase II p300/CBP-associated factor-associated factor 65 kDa subunit 5L is an enzyme that in humans is encoded by the TAF5L gene.

== Function ==
The product of this gene belongs to the WD-repeat TAF5 family of proteins. This gene encodes a protein that is a component of the PCAF histone acetylase complex. The PCAF histone acetylase complex, which is composed of more than 20 polypeptides some of which are TAFs, is required for myogenic transcription and differentiation. TAFs may participate in basal transcription, serve as coactivators, function in promoter recognition or modify general transcription factors to facilitate complex assembly and transcription initiation. The encoded protein is structurally similar to one of the histone-like TAFs, TAF5. Alternatively spliced transcript variants encoding different isoforms have been identified for this gene.

== Interactions ==
TAF5L has been shown to interact with TAF9 and Transcription initiation protein SPT3 homolog.
