= TAF10 =

Protein-coding gene in the species Homo sapiens

Identifiers
- Aliases: TAF10, TAF2A, TAF2H, TAFII30, TATA-box binding protein associated factor 10
- External IDs: OMIM: 600475; MGI: 1346320; GeneCards: TAF10
Available structures
PDB	Ortholog search: PDBe RCSB
PDB	List of PDB id codes 2F69, 3M53, 3M54, 3M55, 3M56, 3M57, 3M58, 3M59, 3M5A, 4J7F, 4J7I, 4J83, 4J8O, 4WV4, 5EG2

Gene location (Human)
Chr.	Chromosome 11 (human)
Band	11p15.4	Start	6,606,294 bp
Band	11p15.4	End	6,612,539 bp

Gene location (Mouse)
Chr.	Chromosome 7 (mouse)
Band	7|7 E3	Start	105,388,600 bp
Band	7|7 E3	End	105,393,568 bp
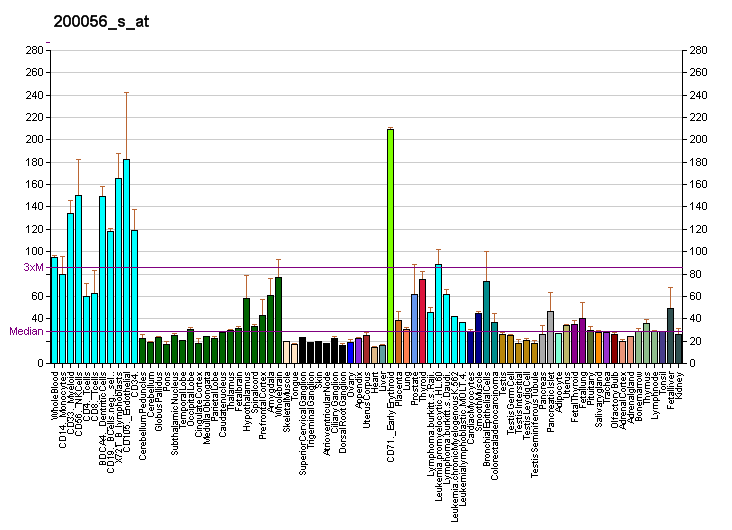

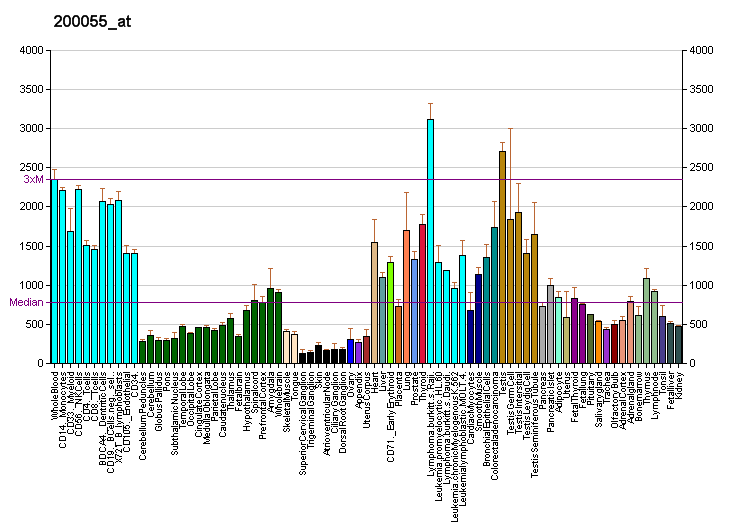
RNA expression pattern
Bgee	Human / Mouse (ortholog); Top expressed in: right testis; left testis; granulocyte; anterior pituitary; left adrenal cortex; right adrenal gland; right adrenal cortex; mucosa of transverse colon; olfactory zone of nasal mucosa; body of pancreas / Top expressed in: yolk sac; right kidney; ventricular zone; embryo; lip; embryo; muscle of thigh; granulocyte; zygote; superior frontal gyrus; More reference expression data
BioGPS	More reference expression data
Gene ontology
Molecular function	DNA-binding transcription factor activity; transcription coactivator activity; histone acetyltransferase activity; protein binding; RNA polymerase binding; enzyme binding; estrogen receptor binding; thiol-dependent deubiquitinase; DNA binding; RNA polymerase II general transcription initiation factor activity
Cellular component	cytoplasm; transcription factor TFTC complex; transcription factor TFIID complex; perinuclear region of cytoplasm; nucleus; nucleoplasm
Biological process	regulation of transcription, DNA-templated; transcription by RNA polymerase II; transcription, DNA-templated; histone deubiquitination; histone H3 acetylation; DNA-templated transcription, initiation; transcription initiation from RNA polymerase II promoter; protein homooligomerization; regulation of signal transduction by p53 class mediator; protein deubiquitination; liver development; apoptotic process; regulation of gene expression; multicellular organism growth; regulation of DNA binding; hepatocyte differentiation; G1/S transition of mitotic cell cycle; positive regulation of nucleic acid-templated transcription
Sources:Amigo / QuickGO
Orthologs
Databases	NCBI: entry; OMA: entry
Species	Human	Mouse
Entrez	6881	24075
Ensembl	ENSG00000166337	ENSMUSG00000043866
UniProt	Q12962	Q8K0H5
RefSeq (mRNA)	NM_006284	NM_020024
RefSeq (protein)	NP_006275	NP_064408
Location (UCSC)	Chr 11: 6.61 – 6.61 Mb	Chr 7: 105.39 – 105.39 Mb
PubMed search
- Wikidata
View/Edit Human	View/Edit Mouse

Transcription initiation factor TFIID subunit 10 is a protein that in humans is encoded by the TAF10 gene.

== Function ==
Initiation of transcription by RNA polymerase II requires the activities of more than 70 polypeptides. The protein that coordinates these activities is transcription factor IID (TFIID), which binds to the core promoter to position the polymerase properly, serves as the scaffold for assembly of the remainder of the transcription complex, and acts as a channel for regulatory signals. TFIID is composed of the TATA-binding protein (TBP) and a group of evolutionarily conserved proteins known as TBP-associated factors or TAFs. TAFs may participate in basal transcription, serve as coactivators, function in promoter recognition or modify general transcription factors (GTFs) to facilitate complex assembly and transcription initiation. This gene encodes one of the small subunits of TFIID that is associated with a subset of TFIID complexes. Studies with human and mammalian cells have shown that this subunit is required for transcriptional activation by the estrogen receptor, for progression through the cell cycle, and may also be required for certain cellular differentiation programs.

== Interactions ==
TAF10 has been shown to interact with TAF9, Transcription initiation protein SPT3 homolog, TAF13 and TATA binding protein.
